= Sealand railway station =

Former railway station in Flintshire, Wales

Sealand
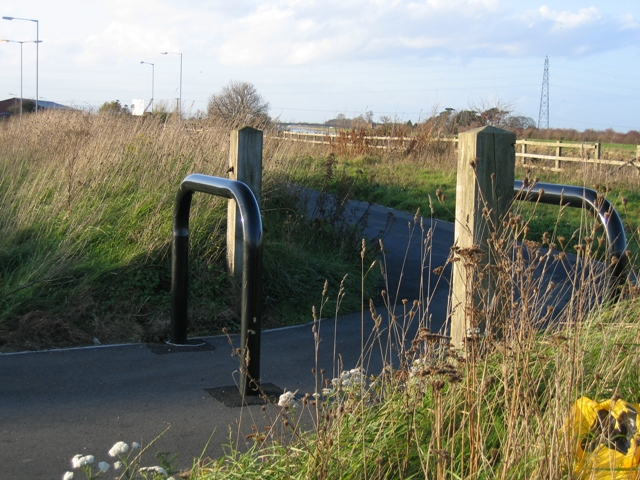
- Site of Sealand railway station near former RAF Sealand in 2006

General information
- Location: Sealand, Flintshire; Wales
- Coordinates: 53.2235°N 3.0045°W
- Grid reference: SJ330700
- Platforms: 2

Other information
- Status: Disused

History
- Original company: Great Central Railway
- Pre-grouping: Great Central Railway
- Post-grouping: London and North Eastern Railway

Key dates
- 17 June 1918: Station opened as Welsh Road Halt
- 14 September 1931: Renamed Sealand
- 9 September 1968: Station closed
Location

Sealand, in Flintshire, Wales, was the final station on the former Chester & Connah's Quay Railway between Chester Northgate in Cheshire, England and Hawarden Bridge in Flintshire. Services also passed through this station before joining the North Wales and Liverpool Railway. Located 200 metres (660 ft) west of the A550 near RAF Sealand, the station was just before a triangular junction at Dee marshes which controlled rail services from North Wales, Liverpool and Cheshire.

== History ==
The station was opened on 17 June 1918 by the Great Central Railway for First World War military personnel based at Sealand Camp. The station, which was originally called Welsh Road Halt, had two adjacent side platforms. It was renamed Sealand in September 1931.

From this station, services from North Wales could either terminate at Chester Northgate Station, the Chester terminus of the Cheshire Lines Committee, or continue on the through line to Manchester Central. Services to and from Liverpool via Bidston used the Grand Central line until joining the Chester & Connah's Quay railway at Dee Marsh junction.

Passenger services ceased on 9 September 1968 when the station was completely closed. The 20-lever signal box continued being used until 14 September 1981.

Even though steelmaking operations at the Corus plant at Shotton ceased in March 1980, freight continued to pass the former station on a double-tracked line until 20 April 1984. Goods services resumed on a single-track line on 31 August 1986 before final closure in the early 1990s. The trackbed is now a cycle way.

== Services ==
Preceding station	Disused railways	Following station
Saughall	Chester & Connah's Quay Railway	Hawarden Bridge railway station
	Disused railways	
Saughall	Great Central Railway	Chester Junction Golf Club Platform
