= Saughall railway station =

Former railway station in Flintshire, Wales

Saughall

General information
- Location: Sealand, Flintshire; Wales
- Coordinates: 53.2151639°N 2.9675250°W
- Grid reference: SJ355690
- Platforms: 2

Other information
- Status: Disused

History
- Original company: Manchester, Sheffield and Lincolnshire Railway
- Pre-grouping: Great Central Railway
- Post-grouping: London and North Eastern Railway

Key dates
- 31 March 1890: Station opened
- 1 February 1954: Station closed
Location

Saughall was a railway station on the former Chester & Connah's Quay Railway between Chester Northgate and Hawarden Bridge. It was 0.63 miles (1.01 km) from the village of Saughall, Cheshire. Although it was named for the village, it was actually in Flintshire, Wales.

== History ==
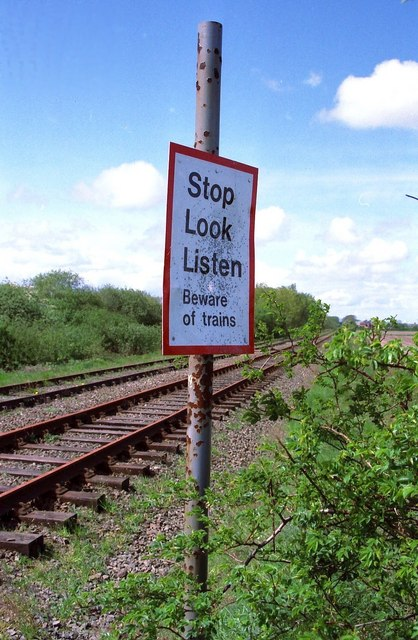
The double-tracked line just to the east of the former Saughall station in 1994; shortly before the track was removed.

The station opened on 31 March 1890 by the Manchester, Sheffield and Lincolnshire Railway (which was renamed Great Central Railway in 1897). The station had a building with two adjacent side platforms and two goods sidings. The signal box had a 21-lever frame and closed on 21 July 1957.

From this station, services from North Wales could stop at Chester Northgate, the Chester terminus of the Cheshire Lines Committee, or continue on the line through Northwich to Manchester Central.

Passenger and freight services ceased on 1 February 1954 when the station was completely closed.

Even though steelmaking operations at the Corus plant at Shotton ceased in March 1980, freight continued to pass the former station on a double-tracked line until 20 April 1984. Goods services resumed on a single-track line on 31 August 1986 before final closure in 1992. The trackbed is now a cycle way.

The station had two side platforms, a station office and buildings, goods sidings, and a signal box. None remain. The site has been completely demolished.

== Services ==
Preceding station	Disused railways	Following station
Blacon	Chester & Connah's Quay Railway; Great Central Railway	Sealand
