= Shotton railway station =

Railway station in Shotton, North Wales

Shotton
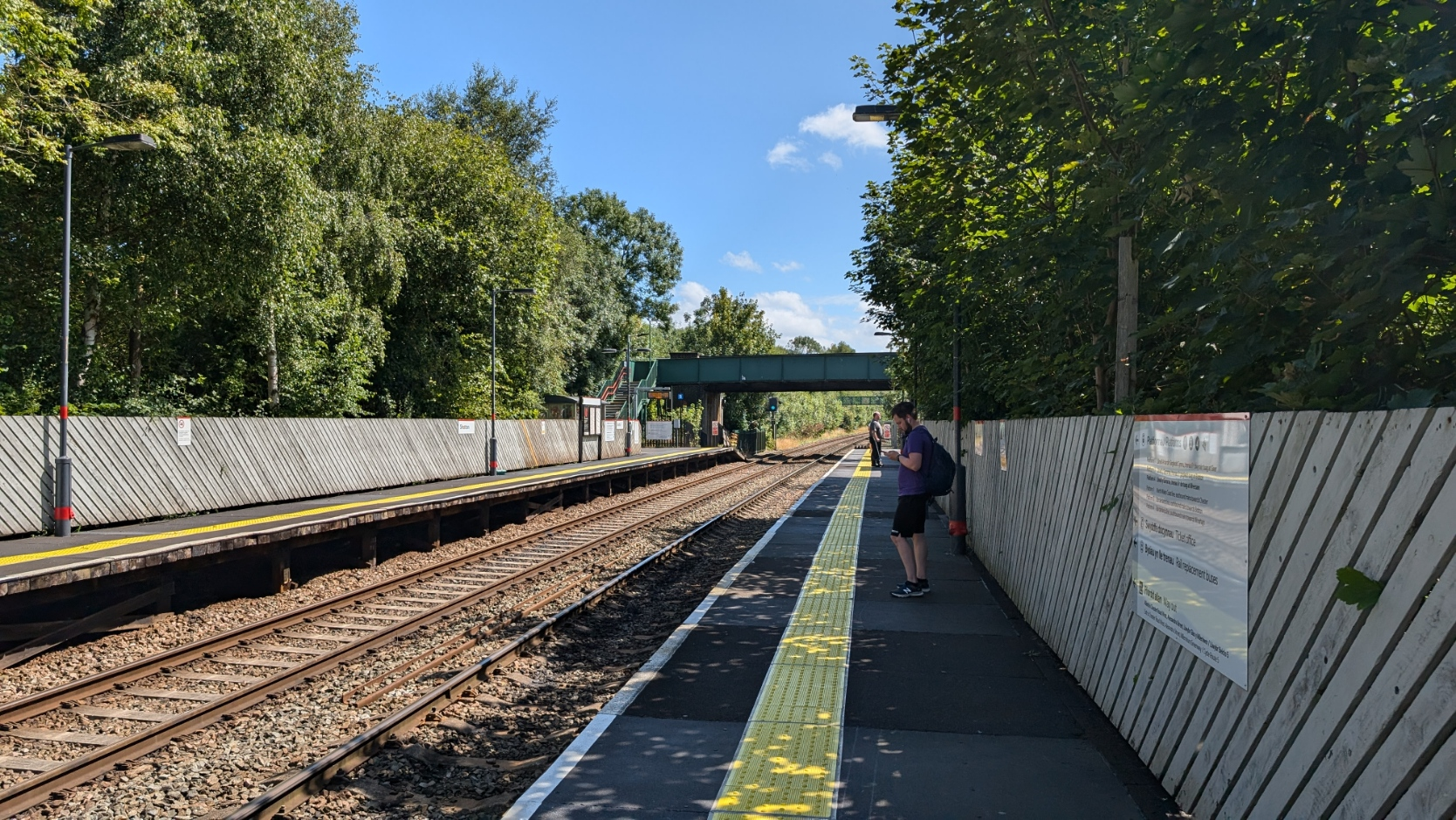
- View along the low level platforms in August 2024

General information
- Location: Shotton, Flintshire; Wales
- Coordinates: 53.213°N 3.038°W
- Grid reference: SJ307689
- Manager: Transport for Wales
- Platforms: 4

Other information
- Station code: SHT
- Classification: DfT category E

Key dates
- 1 October 1891: High level station opened as Connah's Quay & Shotton
- 15 September 1952: High Level and Low Level suffixes added
- 14 February 1966: Shotton Low Level closed
- 21 August 1972: Low level station reopened as part of Shotton
- 26 September 1999: High Level suffix restored

Passengers
- 2020/21: ▼44,368
- Interchange: 3,586
- 2021/22: ▲141,210
- Interchange: ▲12,246
- 2022/23: ▲177,044
- Interchange: ▲12,408
- 2023/24: ▲208,574
- Interchange: ▲15,725
- 2024/25: ▲276,948
- Interchange: ▲22,323
Location
Notes
- Passenger statistics from the Office of Rail and Road

Shotton railway station serves the towns of Connah's Quay, Queensferry and Shotton in Flintshire, Wales. It is situated where the Borderlands Line crosses the North Wales Coast Line. All passenger services are operated by Transport for Wales, which manages the station.

Shotton is split into two sections: Shotton High Level is above street level and serves the Borderlands Line; Shotton Low Level serves the North Wales Coast Line. Each level has two side platforms and both are double tracked. The tracks of the high and low levels cross each other at right angles.

There is a ticket office on the high level Bidston-bound platform. The station is staffed on weekdays and Saturday mornings only.

== History ==
The town gained its first railway as early as 1848 with the opening of the Chester and Holyhead Railway, but the railway company did not provide a station to serve it. The town had to wait until 1891 for its first station, when one was built by the Wrexham, Mold and Connah's Quay Railway as the northern end of their Hawarden Loop line from Buckley. This station opened on 1 October 1891 as Connah's Quay & Shotton and became Shotton High Level on 15 September 1952. It connected there to the Manchester, Sheffield and Lincolnshire Railway's line from Chester Northgate via Hawarden Bridge. The link to Bidston was added by the North Wales and Liverpool Railway in 1896, whilst the LNWR built two wooden platforms on the main line to Holyhead in 1907 to give the town access to trains along the coast to Crewe, Rhyl, Llandudno and Holyhead and to allow interchange with the Wrexham line.

The Beeching cuts of the 1960s saw the low level platforms closed on 14 February 1966 and services to Chester Northgate withdrawn on 9 September 1968, leaving only the Wrexham - Bidston line to serve the high-level platforms. Beeching's original report proposed the closure of both the stations. The loss of the link to Chester proved unpopular however and BR eventually agreed to restore it by re-opening the low level platforms, partly funded by the Hawarden Rural District Council which had lobbied for re-opening. Trains began calling again on 21 August 1972 after new platforms had been built (the slow lines that served the original platforms having been removed in the late sixties as an economy measure). There was an opening ceremony on 17 August.

Between 2009 and 2010, both sets of platforms were refurbished as part of a £1.5 million modernisation scheme. This work (which commenced in March 2009) included platform resurfacing, the installation of new waiting shelters & ticket vending machines, improved signage and a new ticket office. The scheme was completed in early November 2010 with the official opening of the new ticket office by former Alyn & Deeside MP Lord Jones.

== Facilities ==
The ticket office is located on the northbound high level platform and is staffed on weekday mornings (07:30 - 10:30) and on Saturdays (08:45 - 13:45) as noted. At other times, intending passenger should purchase their tickets from the ticket machine or prior to travel (pre-paid tickets can also be collected from the machine). Train running information on all platforms are provided by CIS screens, timetable poster boards and automatic announcements; there is also a customer help point on the high level platform 4 and a payphone on platform 3. No wheelchair access is available to platforms 1, 3 or 4 - the former is only accessible via footbridge, whilst the latter two both have steep ramps unsuitable for wheelchairs and mobility-impaired users. Platform 2 can be reached via a shallow ramp from the small car park at the end of Alexandra Street.

== Services ==
=== Shotton High Level ===
The high level of the station is on the Borderlands Line and consists of two platforms: 3 & 4. Services operate every 45 minutes in each direction (Monday-Saturday daytime) between Wrexham Central and Bidston (where passengers can change for Liverpool). The frequency drops to two-hourly in the evenings and is every 90 minutes on Sundays. To the north of the station on the Borderlands line is Hawarden Bridge over the River Dee.

=== Shotton Low Level ===
Trains operate approximately every hour on the North Wales Coast Line. Services travel between Llandudno and Manchester Piccadilly/Manchester Airport via Chester and Warrington Bank Quay. A number of morning & evening services between Holyhead and either Shrewsbury/Birmingham New Street or Crewe also stop here. There is also a direct Transport for Wales service from Birmingham International (Airport) to Holyhead, calling at Birmingham New Street, Wolverhampton, Shrewsbury, Wrexham, Chester and the North Wales coast stations including Shotton.

Sunday services are infrequent during the morning and early afternoon, but between 1600 and 20:00 the Crewe - Holyhead service calls hourly in each direction.

Preceding station	National Rail	Following station
Hawarden	Transport for Wales; Borderlands Line	Hawarden Bridge
Chester	Transport for Wales; North Wales Coast Line	Flint

== Future ==
In March 2015 Network Rail published the draft version of their Welsh Route Study. It contained a proposal to build a new interchange station that would replace the existing High and Low Level stations, allowing for greater connectivity between the North Wales Coast Main Line and the Borderlands Line. The document recommended a transport planning study to establish the cost, feasibility and benefits of the proposed scheme.

== See also ==
Similar two-level layouts can be found at:

- Lichfield Trent Valley
- Retford
- Smethwick Galton Bridge
- Stratford
- Tamworth
- West Ham
- Willesden Junction
- Worcestershire Parkway

and used to be found further south on the Borderlands Line at Hope Exchange.

== Bibliography ==
- Mitchell, Vic; Smith, Keith (2013). Wrexham to New Brighton. West Sussex: Middleton Press. ISBN 9781908174475. OCLC 859543196.
- Baughan, P.E (1980) A Regional History of the Railways of Great Britain; Volume XI: North and Mid Wales. David & Charles (Publishers) Ltd, Newton Abbott. ISBN 0-946537-59-3.
- Mitchell, Vic; Smith, Keith (2011). Chester to Rhyl. West Sussex: Middleton Press. figs. 35-38. ISBN 9781906008932. OCLC 795178960.
