= Hawarden railway station =

Railway station on the Borderlands Line in Flintshire, Wales

Hawarden Welsh: Penarlâg
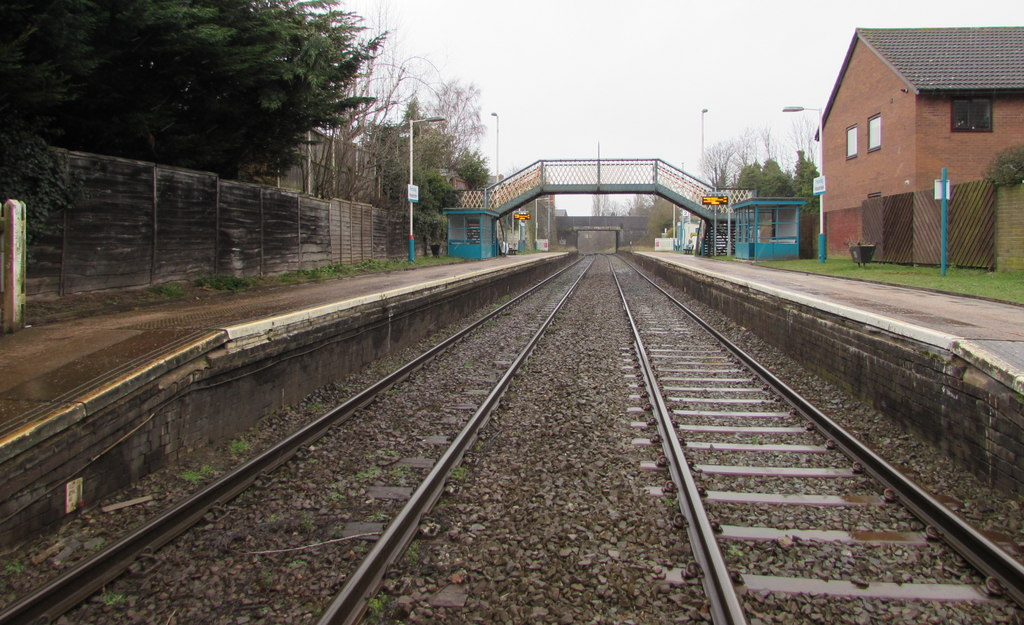

General information
- Location: Hawarden, Flintshire; Wales
- Coordinates: 53.185°N 3.032°W
- Grid reference: SJ311658
- Manager: Transport for Wales
- Platforms: 2

Other information
- Station code: HWD
- Classification: DfT category F2

Key dates
- 31 March 1890: Opened

Passengers
- 2021/22: ▲17,304
- 2022/23: ▲23,164
- 2023/24: ▼19,932
- 2024/25: ▲30,564
- 2025/26: ▲36,692
Location
Notes
- Passenger statistics from the Office of Rail and Road

Hawarden railway station (Welsh: Penarlâg) serves the village of Hawarden in Flintshire, Wales. It is situated on the Borderlands Line 10 1/2 miles (16.9 km) north of Wrexham Central and all passenger services are operated by Transport for Wales. The station is unstaffed.

== History ==
The station is located on the "Hawarden Loop" section of the Wrexham, Mold and Connah's Quay Railway and was opened with the line in 1890. It is close to the summit of a steep bank from Shotton, with a ruling gradient of 1 in 53. The station had a goods yard, which closed on 4 May 1964. From 1890 until 2 November 1979, situated at the southern end of the Wrexham-bound platform, a 20-lever signal box was in use.

== Facilities ==
As noted, the station is unstaffed and has no ticket machine, so tickets must be purchased on the train or prior to travel. The former station building is still extant though heavily modified (now used as a private dwelling) and the station also retains its lattice footbridge (plus basic waiting shelters on both platforms). Train running information is offered via CIS screens and timetable posters. Step-free access is only possible to the southbound platform (as the footbridge is not accessible).

== Services ==
Services operate every hour each way (Monday to Saturday daytime) between Wrexham Central and Bidston. On weekday evenings & bank holidays, the frequency drops to two-hourly and on Sundays there are departures every 90 minutes each way.

Passengers can change at Bidston for Liverpool, Shotton for North Wales, Chester, and Manchester Piccadilly and at Wrexham General for Shrewsbury, Birmingham New Street, Hereford and South Wales.

Preceding station	National Rail	Following station
Buckley	Transport for Wales; Borderlands Line	Shotton

== Gallery ==
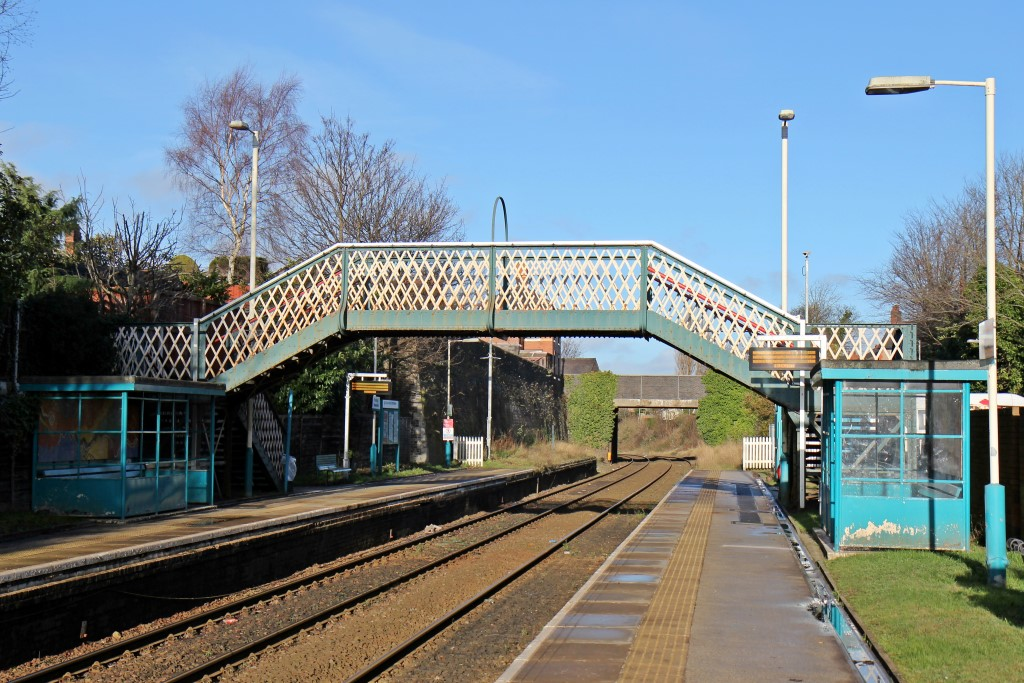
The station platforms and footbridge.

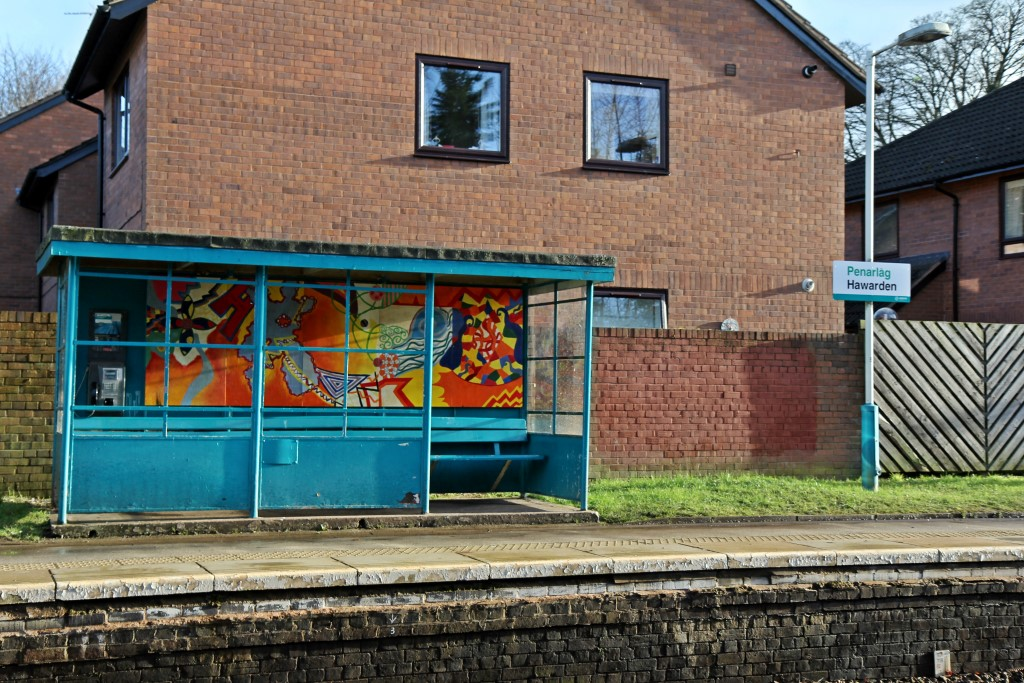
One of the two decorated waiting shelters.

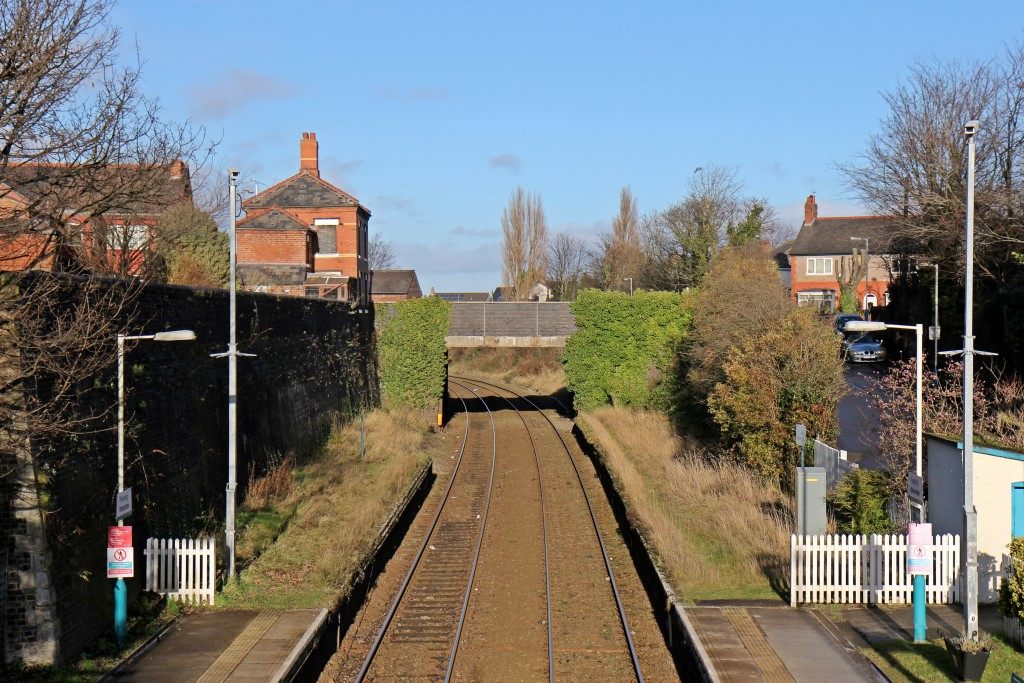
Disused sections of platform at the northern end of the station, viewed from the footbridge.

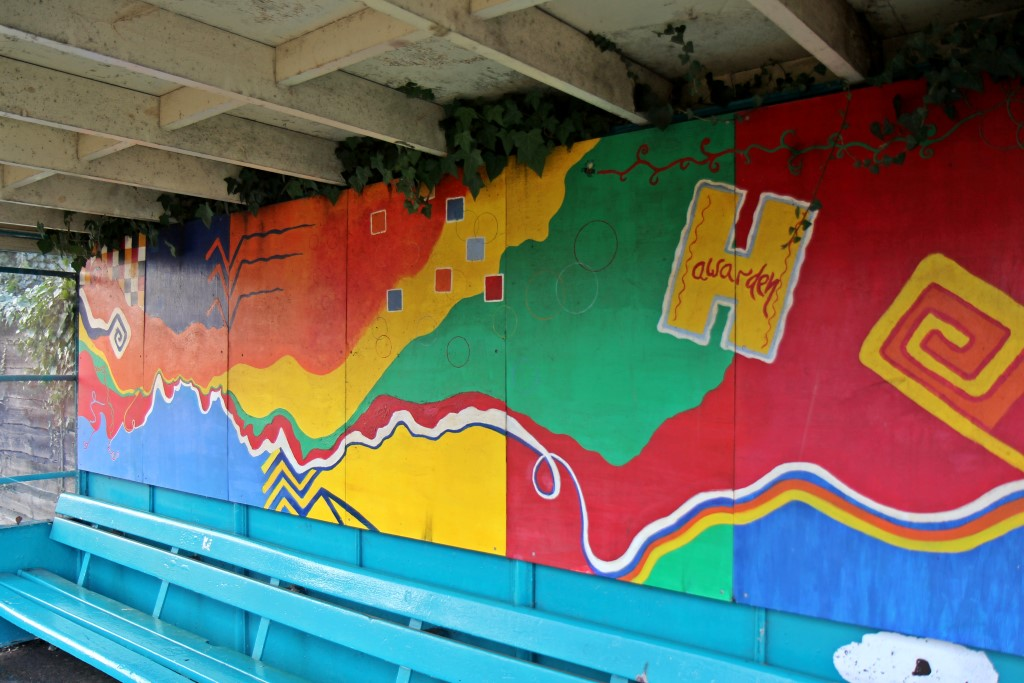
Inside the waiting shelter on the Bidston-bound platform.
