= Chester Liverpool Road railway station =

Former railway station in England

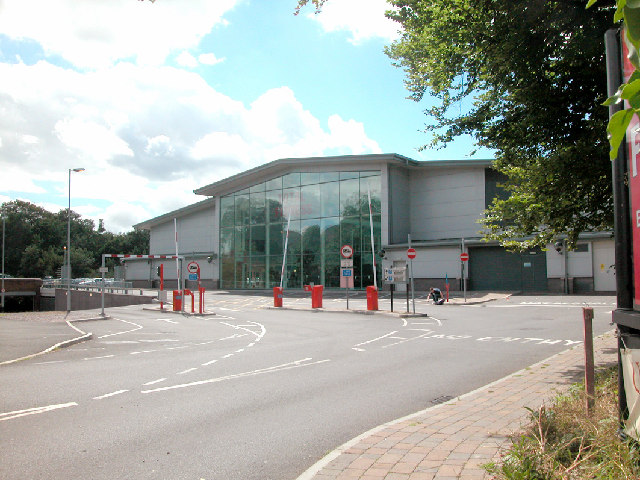
- Site of the former Chester Liverpool Road station in 2005

General information
- Location: Chester, Cheshire West and Chester; England
- Coordinates: 53.200953°N 2.894964°W
- Grid reference: SJ405669
- Platforms: 4

Other information
- Status: Disused

History
- Original company: Manchester, Sheffield and Lincolnshire Railway
- Pre-grouping: Great Central Railway
- Post-grouping: London and North Eastern Railway

Key dates
- 31 March 1890: Station opened
- 3 December 1951: passenger service withdrawn
- 5 April 1965: Station closed
Location

Chester Liverpool Road was a station on the former Chester & Connah's Quay Railway between Chester Northgate and Hawarden Bridge. It was located at the junction of Liverpool Road and Brook Lane in Chester, Cheshire, England.

== History ==
The station was opened on 31 March 1890 by the Manchester, Sheffield and Lincolnshire Railway (which was renamed Great Central Railway in 1897). The station had an island with two adjacent side platforms because it served two routes. Services from North Wales or Seacombe with its ferry connection to Liverpool (using the Great Central Railway) could either terminate at Chester Northgate Station, the Chester terminus of the Cheshire Lines Committee, or continue on the through line to Manchester Central. The through lines, which linked Dee Marsh junction to the CLC route to Manchester, passed to the north of the island platform, whereas the branch lines that ran to Chester Northgate went to the south of the island platform.

The station's four platforms were used as follows:

1. for westbound trains leaving Chester Northgate for North Wales or Seacombe (side)
2. for eastbound trains terminating at Chester Northgate (island).
3. for westbound through trains for North Wales or Seacombe (island).
4. for eastbound through trains bound for Manchester (side).

Chester Liverpool Road also had a goods yard with sidings.

Passenger services ceased on 3 December 1951. Freight services ceased on 5 April 1965.

Even though steelmaking operations at the Corus plant at Shotton ceased in March 1980, freight continued to pass the former station on a double-tracked line until 20 April 1984. Goods services resumed on a single-track line on 31 August 1986 before final closure in the early 1990s. The trackbed is now a cycle way.

The station was demolished in the 1970s. The site then became a coal yard. In the 2000s the area was completely redeveloped for a fitness centre.

== Services ==
Preceding station	Disused railways	Following station
Chester Northgate	Chester & Connah's Quay Railway; GCR	Blacon
