= Blacon railway station =

Former railway station in Cheshire, England

Blacon
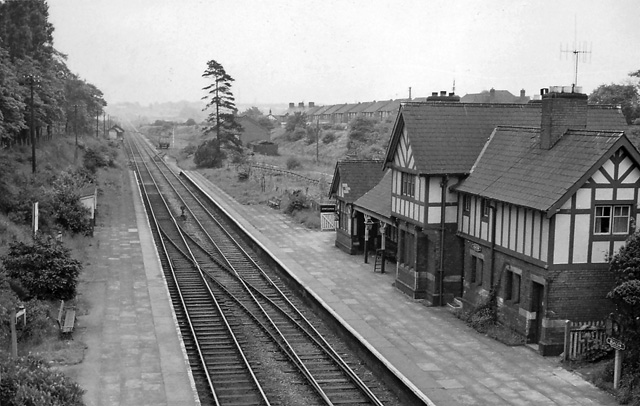
- An eastbound view of Blacon station in 1961.

General information
- Location: Blacon, Cheshire West and Chester; England
- Coordinates: 53.2064°N 2.9252°W
- Grid reference: SJ383680
- Platforms: 2

Other information
- Status: Disused

History
- Original company: Manchester, Sheffield and Lincolnshire Railway
- Pre-grouping: Great Central Railway
- Post-grouping: London and North Eastern Railway

Key dates
- 31 March 1890: Station opened
- 9 September 1968: Station closed
Location

Blacon railway station served the suburb of Blacon, in Cheshire, England. It was a stop on the line between Chester Northgate and Hawarden Bridge, which was later extended to reach Wrexham and Birkenhead.

== History ==
Blacon station opened on 31 March 1890 by the Manchester, Sheffield and Lincolnshire Railway (later the Great Central Railway). The station had two side platforms and the station master's house. To the east was a brick goods warehouse with freight depot and sidings. The 21-lever signal box, opposite the goods yard, was in use until 6 October 1963. A return to Chester Northgate station would cost 6d, compared to a bus fare of 9d return.

Despite being a busy station, British Railways closed it to passengers on 9 September 1968 as part of the Beeching Axe for the economic modernisation of the British railway network in the mid-1960s. Even with the closure of steelmaking operations at Shotton in March 1980, freight continued to use the line through the station until 20 April 1984. Goods services resumed use of the now single track line on 31 August 1986, before the railway closed completely in 1992.

Preceding station	Disused railways	Following station
Chester Liverpool Road	Chester & Connah's Quay Railway; Great Central Railway	Saughall

== The site today ==
The station buildings have been demolished, although the nearby road bridge over the former track remains. The trackbed has been replaced by a tarmac road surface, which now provides a shared-use path. A sign and information board were erected to mark the former station site.

== Gallery ==
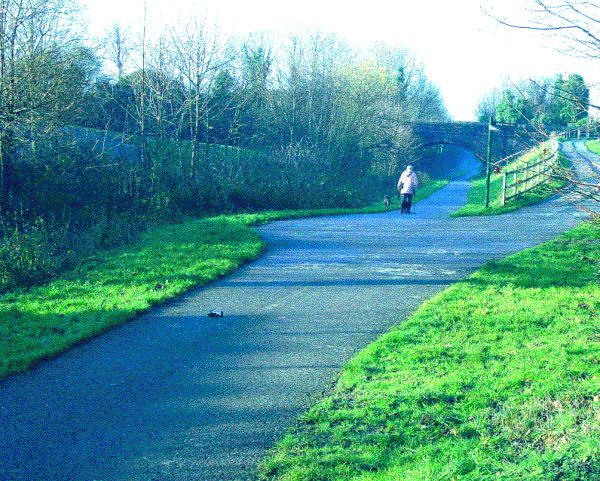
A view of the path that has replaced the line, December 2006

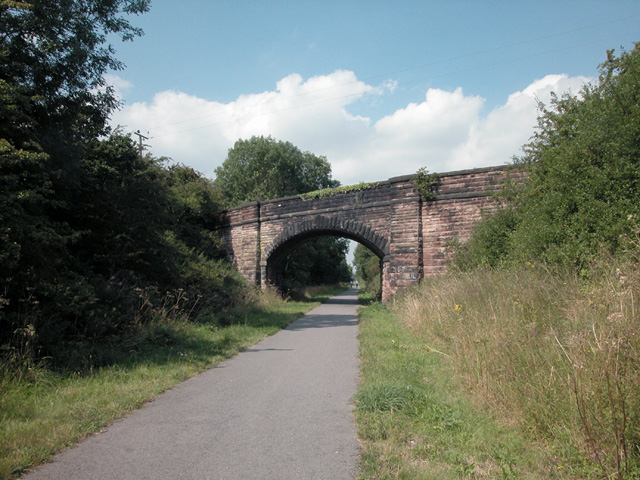
Looking eastbound towards the former station's site beyond the bridge.
