= Liverpool Road railway station =

There several railway stations known as Liverpool Road:

- Chester Liverpool Road railway station
- Liverpool Road railway station (Manchester)
- Liverpool Road Halt railway station (Newcastle-under-Lyme)
- Kidsgrove Liverpool Road railway station
- Liverpool Street station, London
