= Deeside Parkway railway station =

Proposed railway station in Wales

Deeside Parkway

General information
- Location: Deeside, Flintshire; Wales
- Coordinates: 53.2411°N 3.0352°W
- Grid reference: SJ310720
Location

Deeside Parkway (Welsh: Parcffordd Glannau Dyfrdwy) is a proposed railway station situated between Neston and Hawarden Bridge on the Borderlands Line. The station is intended to serve the Deeside area of Flintshire, North Wales, particularly the Deeside Industrial Park.

Deeside Parkway station forms part of the wider plan for the North Wales Metro, and is considered to be a key component of the plan. The proposed station was shortlisted for preliminary assessment by the Welsh Government in July 2017, and prioritised for development in April 2019. Funding to develop the proposal was announced in November 2020, as part of the third round of the New Stations Fund. The station has a projected cost of £22.56m to build, exclusive of VAT.

The October 2017 Liverpool City Region Combined Authority update to the Long Term Rail Strategy mentions the station at Deeside Industrial Park as planned to be built between Network Rail Control Periods CP5 and CP7.

Preceding station	Future services	Following station
Hawarden Bridge	Transport for Wales Borderlands Line	Neston
