= Hawarden Bridge railway station =

Railway station in Flintshire, Wales

Hawarden Bridge Pont Penarlâg
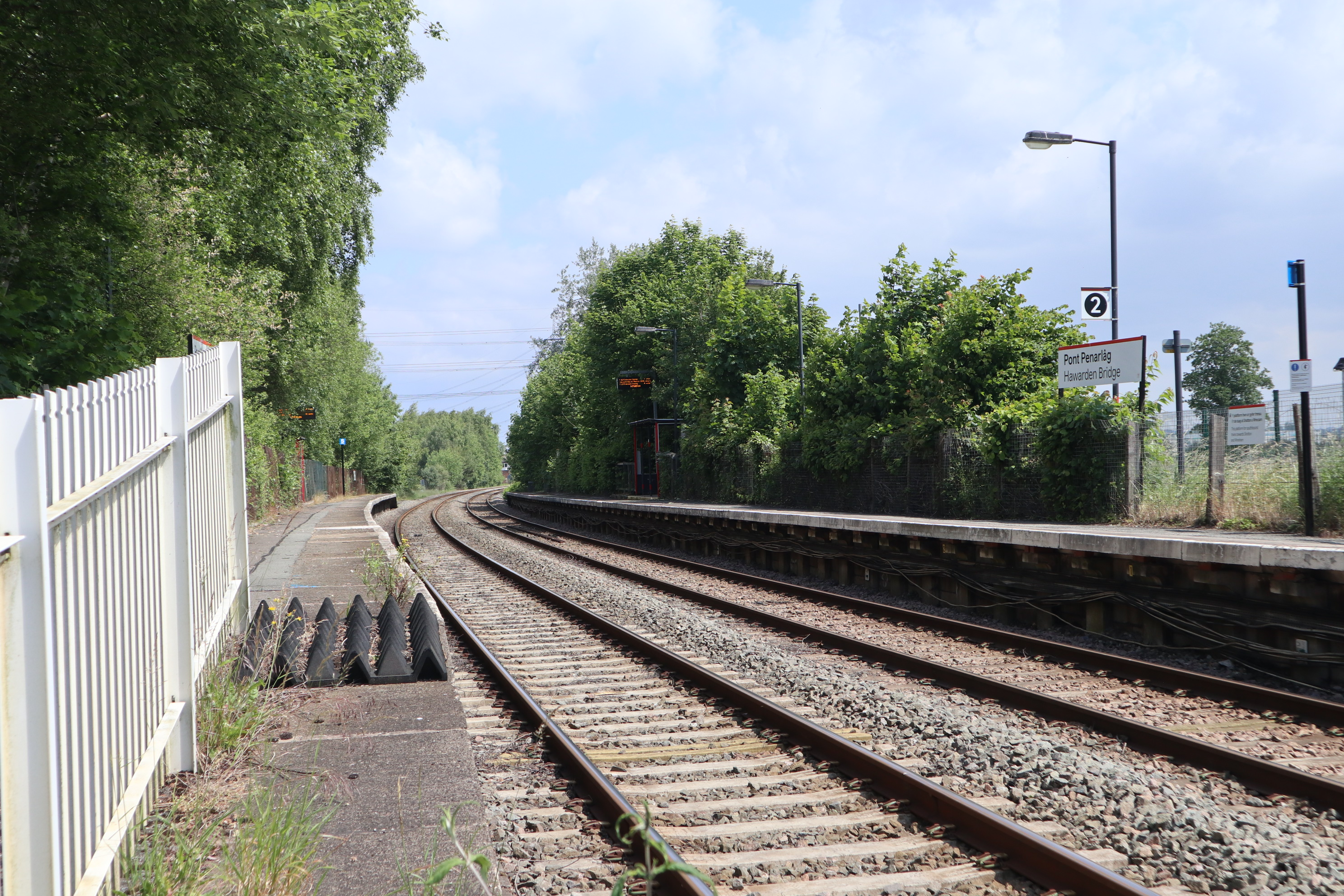
- Hawarden Bridge pictured in 2024

General information
- Location: Shotton, Flintshire; Wales
- Coordinates: 53.218167°N 3.032121°W
- Grid reference: SJ311695
- Manager: Transport for Wales
- Platforms: 2

Other information
- Station code: HWB
- Classification: DfT category F2

Key dates
- 22 September 1924: Opened as Hawarden Bridge Halt
- 1954: Renamed as Hawarden Bridge

Passengers
- 2021/22: ▲1,268
- 2022/23: ▲2,006
- 2023/24: ▲2,356
- 2024/25: ▲10,230
- 2025/26: ▲16,466
Location
Notes
- Passenger statistics from the Office of Rail and Road

Hawarden Bridge railway station (Welsh: Pont Penarlâg) is a railway station near Shotton, Flintshire, Wales. It is situated on the Borderlands line 13 miles (21 km) north of Wrexham Central, on the north side of Hawarden Bridge over the River Dee. The station and all trains serving it are operated by Transport for Wales.

== History ==
The station was opened by the LNER on 22 September 1924 as Hawarden Bridge Halt, adjacent to the John Summers steelworks. The station was renamed as Hawarden Bridge in 1954 when it was upgraded.

The station was considerably busier in times past, being the nearest to the triangular junction with the former line to Chester Northgate and Mickle Trafford as well as the steel plant. The Chester line closed to passengers in September 1968, but remained open for freight until June 1992 (it is now a footpath and cycleway) whilst the shutdown of much of the works in 1980 (with the loss of 6,000 jobs) led to a significant decline in use of the station.

The signal box to the north of Dee Marsh Junction remains in use to control access to the remnants of the former Shotwick Sidings for the dispatch of finished steel products. The sidings were once used by heavy trains of iron ore from Bidston Dock in Birkenhead bound for the sidings Shotwick. An industrial park and rail-connected paper mill now occupy part of the old Shotton works site, whilst the rolling mill there is still operational receiving steel coil for processing from South Wales by rail. The signal box also acts as the 'fringe' to the Merseyside Integrated Electronic Control Centre at Sandhills.

It is situated immediately to the north of the Hawarden Bridge railway swing bridge that last opened in 1960.

== Facilities ==
The station is unstaffed and only has basic amenities (CIS screens, waiting shelters and timetable poster boards on each platform). Step-free access is available to both platforms, but transfer between them requires the use of a barrow crossing. The Chester Millennium Greenway cycle route runs adjacent to the station and provides access to the northbound platform. The route also connects the station to Shotton.

== Services ==
Previously the station saw an infrequent service, with the only trains calling during the morning and evening peak periods towards Wrexham Central southbound and Bidston northbound. Services were enhanced in May 2013 when Arriva Trains Wales introduced a Sunday service at the station - with all passenger services (every 90 minutes) stopping at the station (on request). Services were further enhanced a decade later in December 2023, where now all services on the line will stop (on request), giving a service approximately every 45 minutes Monday to Saturday daytimes (dropping to two-hourly from mid evening and approximately every 90 minutes on Sundays).

Preceding station	National Rail	Following station
Shotton	Transport for Wales; Borderlands Line	Neston
	Historical railways	
Shotton; Line and station open	Chester & Connah's Quay Railway	Sealand; Line and station closed

== Bibliography ==
- Mitchell, Vic; Smith, Keith (2013). Wrexham to New Brighton. West Sussex: Middleton Press. ISBN 9781908174475. OCLC 859543196.
