= Wrexham, Mold and Connah's Quay Railway =

British railway company

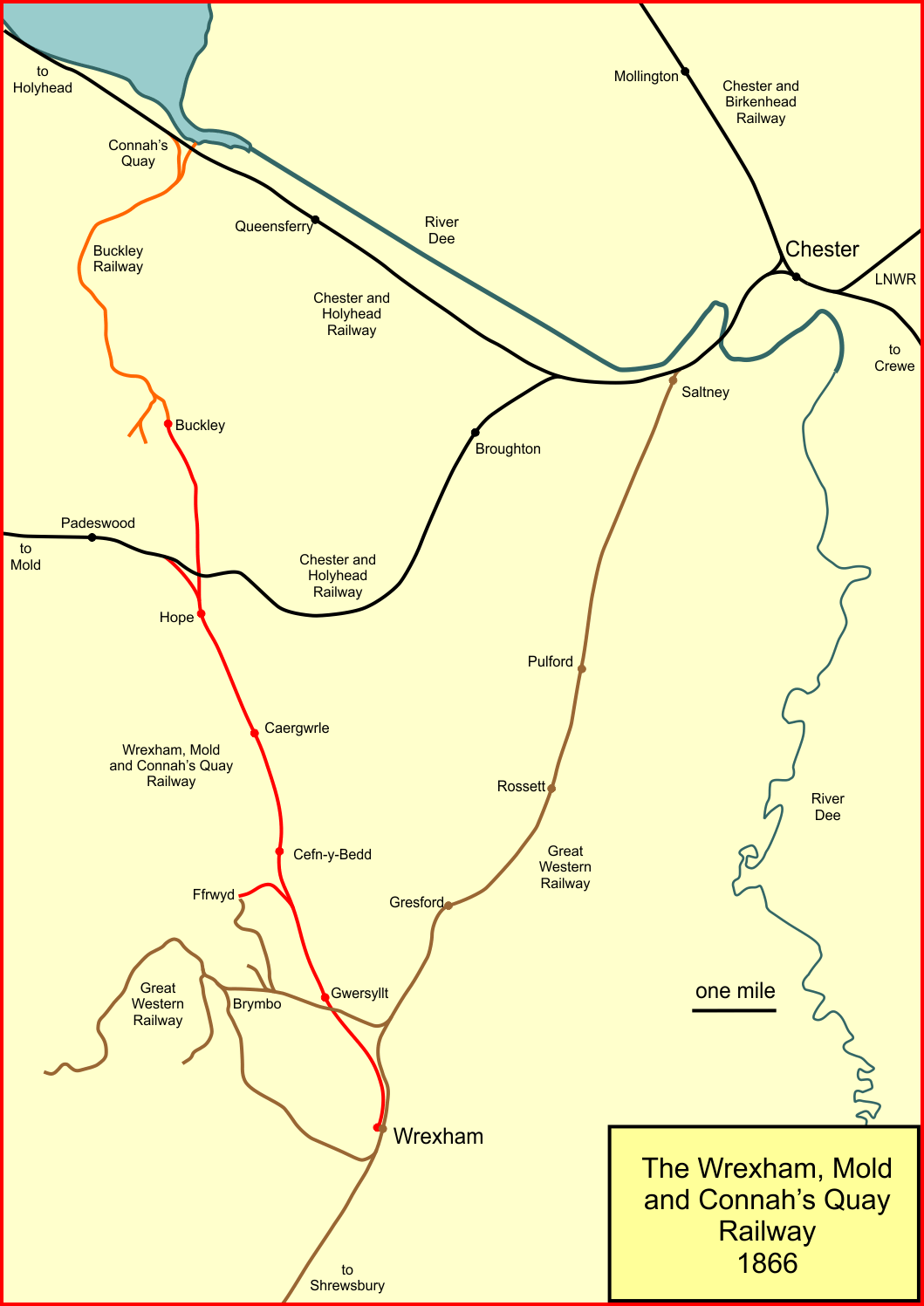
The Wrexham, Mold and Connah’s Quay Railway

The Buckley Railway was opened from Buckley to a connection with the Chester to Holyhead main line on 7 June 1862, to convey coal and finished brickworks products from the Buckley area. Numerous short tramroads had existed in the area from the 1700s. The line was steeply graded (1 in 28 between Northop Hall and Connah's Quay) and sharply curved.

The Wrexham, Mold and Connah's Quay Railway (WM&CQR) was incorporated in 1862 to build a line from Wrexham to Buckley, continuing to the C&HR main line via the Buckley Railway, which it joined at Ashton's Branch Junction. It later bought the Buckley Railway. The WM&CQR had plans for extensions but was unable to raise money to bring all of them into being. Short branches to mineral workings around Brymbo were opened.

The WM&CQR allied itself with the Manchester, Sheffield and Lincolnshire Railway (later the Great Central Railway) which provided the finance to cross the River Dee and connect to Chester and its own system over the Cheshire Lines Committee tracks.

The WM&CQR was dependent on the mineral workings, and when they declined so did the railway; but the main line from Wrexham to Hawarden Bridge (and on to Bidston) remains open to passenger and freight traffic as the Borderlands Line.

== The Buckley Railway ==
The area of Flintshire, on the south bank of the River Dee near Buckley, had considerable deposits of coal, iron and also of other minerals. As these lay close to the surface, they were extracted from an early date. The proximity of the river for transport to market assisted in the prosperity of these workings. A large number of early wagonways were built to take the minerals to the river; the earliest were wooden railways, and in later years plateways were constructed. These lines were mostly short and were generally independent of other nearby lines.

In addition to coal and metals, there were deposits of good quality clay around Buckley. This had been dug since about 1750, but with the coming of the railway age, the demand for bricks had increased greatly and a means of conveying them to market was essential. In addition there was considerable manufacture of bricks and tiles, which were fragile and required careful handling. The existing tramroads were in effect a monopoly, and their failure to modernise limited the transport opportunities for new mineral works.

Buckley Railway Act 1860
- Act of Parliament
- Parliament of the United Kingdom
- Long title: An Act for making a Railway from Buckley to Connah's Quay in the County of Flint, and for other Purposes.
- Citation: 23 & 24 Vict. c. lxxxix

Dates
- Royal assent: 14 June 1860

This prompted the formation of the Buckley Railway, which was conceived to connect claypits and other sites around Buckley to Connah's Quay Dock on the River Dee, by a locomotive railway. It would also have a direct connection to the Chester and Holyhead Railway, allied to the London and North Western Railway. The Buckley Railway was already in existence, as a 2 ft 6 in (762 mm) gauge horse tramway. It got an act of Parliament, the Buckley Railway Act 1860 (23 & 24 Vict. c. lxxxix), authorising this on 14 June 1860. The line was to be steeply graded and sharply curved. (Note: Baughan implies that this was a conversion of the Buckley’s existing tramroads, but Boyd shows numerous tramroads with overlapping interests, but no direct formal common ownership.)

The line opened on 7 June 1862, and was worked by the WM&CQR from 1863.

Buckley Railway (Additional Powers) Act 1866
- Act of Parliament
- Parliament of the United Kingdom
- Long title: An Act to enable the Buckley Railway Company to carry Passengers upon their Railway, and to raise further Monies; and for other Purposes.
- Citation: 29 & 30 Vict. c. xli

Dates
- Royal assent: 18 May 1866

In 1866 the Buckley Railway secured powers to operate passenger trains in the Buckley Railway (Additional Powers) Act 1866 (29 & 30 Vict. c. xli), but the powers were never used except for occasional excursion trains to Rhyl.

== Wrexham, Mold and Connah's Quay Railway ==
Getting mineral products away from Buckley was all very well, but there were much more important minerals further south-east in the North Wales coalfield. Several prospective companies were formed to transport these minerals, and the battle for authorisation in Parliament was reduced to a GWR-supported scheme, and the Whitchurch, Wrexham, Mold and Connah's Quay Railway (WWM&CQR), promoted by Benjamin Piercy. The significance of Whitchurch was as an outlet to the London and North Western Railway there.

Wrexham, Mold and Connah's Quay Railway Act 1862
- Act of Parliament
- Parliament of the United Kingdom
- Long title: An Act for incorporating a Company for making and maintaining the Wrexham, Mold, and Connah's Quay Junction Railway; and for other Purposes.
- Citation: 25 & 26 Vict. c. ccxxi

Dates
- Royal assent: 7 August 1862

After considerable argument in Parliament, the WWM&CQR was passed, but reduced to the area from Wrexham northwards. The Wrexham, Mold and Connah's Quay Railway Act 1862 (25 & 26 Vict. c. ccxxi) received royal assent on 7 August 1862, and recognising the reduction in geographical extent, its title was the Wrexham, Mold and Connah's Quay Railway (WM&CQR). It was authorised to purchase the Buckley Railway. It was to run from Wrexham broadly northwards through Caergwrle and crossing the Mold Railway (where south-to-west and north-to-west curves were authorised) to Hope, where it joined the Buckley Railway. The WM&CQR main line was to be 9 miles long, with a ruling gradient of 1 in 70.

The line opened for goods and mineral traffic on 1 January 1866; stations at first were Wrexham, Gwersyllt, Cefn-y-Bedd, Caergwrle, Hope Junction (later renamed Penyffordd), and Buckley. The south-to-west curve at Hope was constructed, even though running powers to Mold had been refused in Parliament. The authorised north-to-west curve there was started but never completed while the south to east curve was completed but had tracks removed almost immediately. There was never a North to East curve.

After improvements required by the Board of Trade inspecting officer, chiefly platforms on passing loops, the line opened for passengers on 1 May 1866. There were three passenger trains each way daily, with a connecting bus from Hope to Mold.

Mold was a significant market centre, and the WM&CQR negotiated with the LNWR (owner of the Mold Railway) to erect an exchange station on each line at the point of intersection. The facilities were basic, and there was no access from public roads to the station. The station was known as Hope Exchange, and opened in 1867. The Mold bus service was discontinued.

In the latter half of the decade, the WM&CQR attempted to obtain authorisation for extensions, notably into the Wirral. Some very short connections were approved, but the only significant approved line was to run to Whitchurch; this was approved, but the WM&CQR was unable to raise the capital needed to build it.

Wrexham, Mold, and Connah's Quay Railway Company's Act 1873
- Act of Parliament
- Parliament of the United Kingdom
- Long title: An Act for leasing the Buckley Railway to the Wrexham, Mold, and Connah's Quay Railway Company; and to make certain arrangements with reference to the Capital of the Wrexham. Mold. and Connah's Quay Railway Company; and for other purposes.
- Citation: 36 & 37 Vict. c. ccxxxii

Dates
- Royal assent: 5 August 1873

Text of statute as originally enacted

However, by the Wrexham, Mold, and Connah's Quay Railway Company's Act 1873 (36 & 37 Vict. c. ccxxxii) of 5 August 1873 the WM&CQR leased the Buckley Railway, which it had been working from 1866.

== Extending the network ==
Wrexham Mold and Connah's Quay Railway Act 1882
- Act of Parliament
- Parliament of the United Kingdom
- Long title: An Act to enable the Wrexham Mold and Connah's Quay Railway Company to make new Branch Railways Roads Streets and other Works to raise further Capital and for other purposes.
- Citation: 45 & 46 Vict. c. ccxxxii

Dates
- Royal assent: 18 August 1882

Text of statute as originally enacted

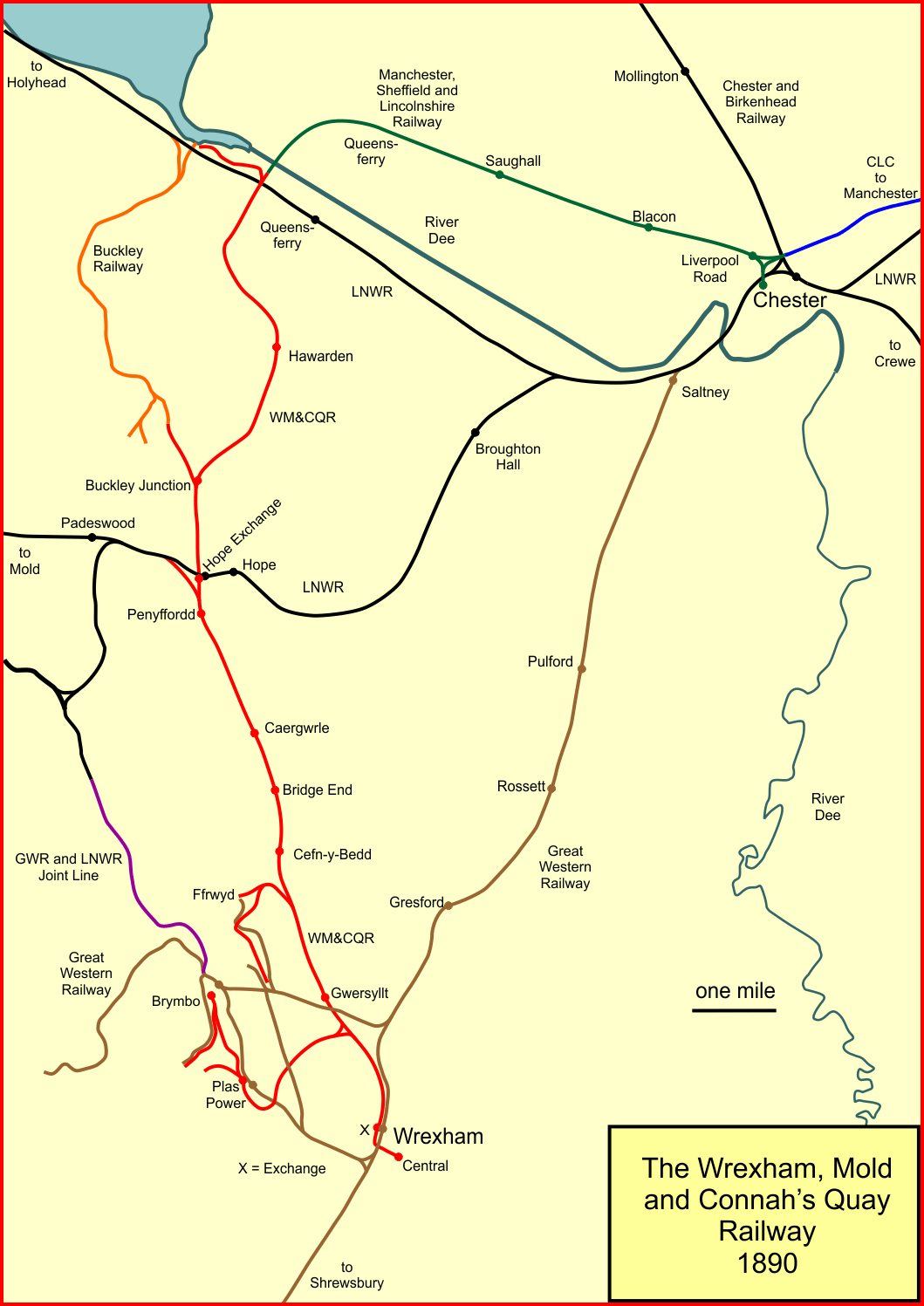
The railway as of 1890

The WM&CQR directors continued to believe that the commercial success of their line lay in expanding the network, most particularly in crossing the River Dee and reaching Birkenhead. On 18 August 1882 powers were granted by the Wrexham Mold and Connah's Quay Railway Act 1882 (45 & 46 Vict. c. ccxxxii) for part of that scheme: the Hawarden Loop. This was to be a new double track railway running to the Dee some distance east of the Buckley Railway route, to Shotton with a Deeside wharf there. The powers allowed crossing the Dee at this point to a new dock on the north shore. The company name was to be changed to the North Wales Railways and Docks Company, but this was never put into effect. A short extension eastward from the Wrexham station into the centre of the town was also allowed.

The Wrexham extension was opened on 1 November 1887; the station was named Wrexham Central and the former terminus was renamed Wrexham Exchange. There was a GWR station alongside at this point; for many years those two station were independent of one another. The branch was doubled in 1889.

== Hawarden loop ==
Wrexham, Mold and Connah's Quay Railway Act 1883
- Act of Parliament
- Parliament of the United Kingdom
- Long title: An Act to enable the Wrexham Mold and Connah's Quay Railway Company to make New Railways to raise further Capital and for other purposes.
- Citation: 46 & 47 Vict. c. lxv

Dates
- Royal assent: 29 June 1883

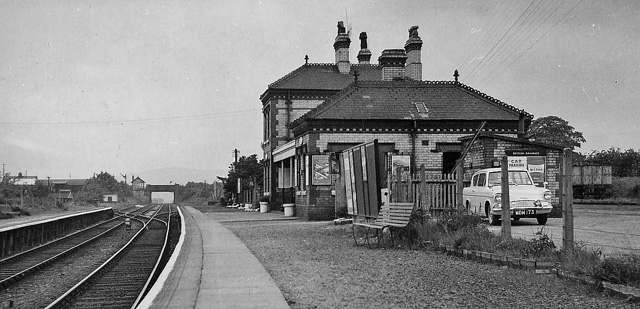
Buckley Junction Station

On 31 March 1890 a further line was opened by the WMCQR: it had been authorised by the Wrexham, Mold and Connah's Quay Railway Act 1883 (46 & 47 Vict. c. lxv). The Hawarden Loop had a new station called Buckley Junction though it was never a junction for passenger trains. The old Buckley station near Drury was closed upon opening of Buckley Junction and the Hawarden Loop but after local complaints as it was further from the town centre, it was reopened from 1 June 1893. The reopening was not a success and the station closed permanently in February 1895. The Hawarden Loop by-passed the original Buckley Railway line, on a gentler gradient (1 in 52), although still a steep one, and gentler curvature. It deviated from the original line south of Buckley station and curved to the east, passing through Hawarden and reaching Shotton High Level (originally Connah's Quay and Shotton) where an exchange station was made with the C&HR. Connah's Quay Docks was served by a branch by a riverside line from Shotton High Level.

== Brymbo branch ==
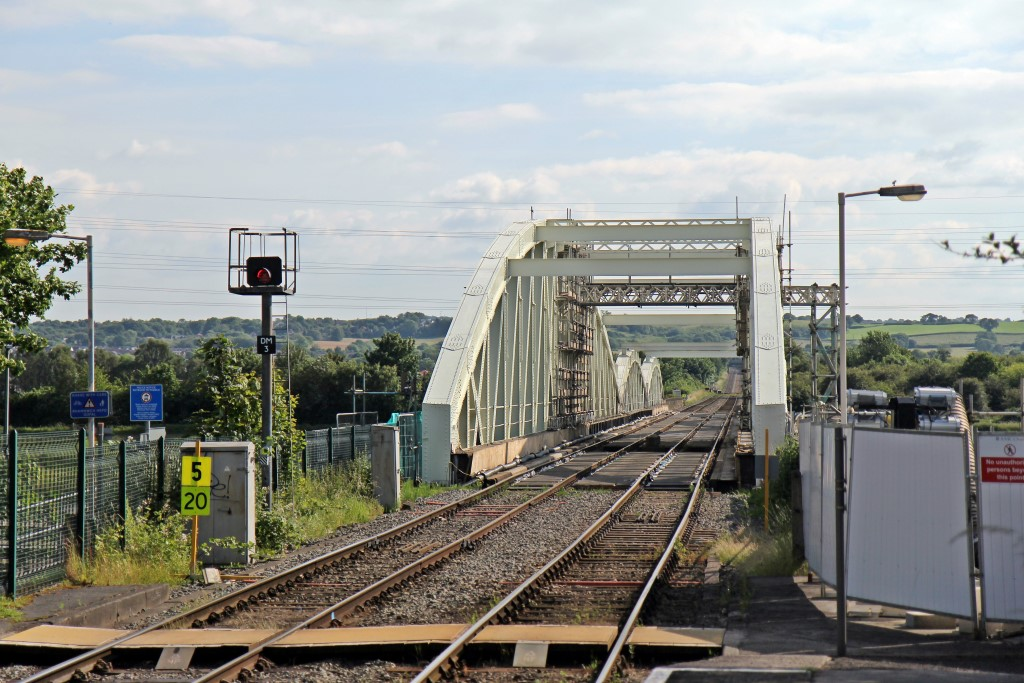
Hawarden Bridge and railway station

The four mile line opened from a triangular junction near Gwersyllt, to Moss & Pentre in 1882, (Note: The same year as royal assent.) to Plas Power, where it connected to the Wrexham and Minera line, in June 1864, and to Brymbo in 1887. Passenger operation started on 1 August 1889 and halts were opened in 1905 and 1906. A half-mile branch back from Brymbo to Vron colliery was opened on 8 October 1888.

== The Dee Crossing ==
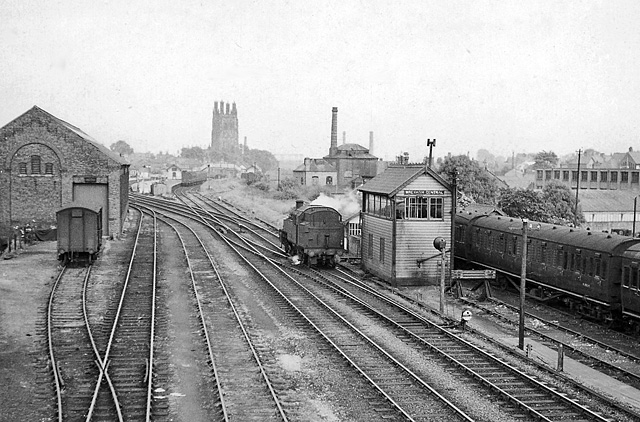
Wrexham Central railway station

Notwithstanding the friendly relations with the London and North Western Railway, the WM&CQR turned to the Manchester, Sheffield and Lincolnshire Railway (MS&LR) for help from 1884. The Dee Crossing was authorised, but unaffordable for the WM&CQR, and the MS&LR agreed to build from Shotton High Level (on the south side of the Dee) into Chester. This took the form of the Chester and Connah's Quay Railway, authorised on 31 July 1885. This ran from the end of the Hawarden loop at Shotton to the Cheshire Lines Committee (CLC) network at Chester Northgate. The MS&LR was a participant in the CLC and this gave the company access from the WM&CQR lines to its own network further east.

The Hawarden Bridge, a prodigious structure, was inaugurated on 3 August 1889 with an opening span for river traffic, and the line from Chester to Shotton High Level, crossing the bridge, was opened on 31 March 1890. A Chester Northgate to Wrexham passenger service of three trains a day was started, worked by the MS&LR.

== Wrexham and Ellesmere Railway ==
The Wrexham and Ellesmere Railway had been conceived as a possible link in a chain of railways bringing South Wales minerals to the Wirral Peninsula. The plan never took off, but the line was opened on 2 November 1895.

== Into the Wirral ==
At one stage a joint Great Western Railway and Manchester, Sheffield and Lincolnshire Railway (MS&LR) railway to Birkenhead had been proposed, but nothing came of that. Instead the MS&LR and the WM&CQR built the line from Hawarden Bridge to Bidston, on the Wirral Railway. The line was titled the North Wales and Liverpool Railway. The WM&CQR could hardly afford the outlay for the 14 mile line, but it opened for goods trains on 16 March 1896. Passenger services followed on 18 May 1896, worked by the WM&CQR but using hired MS&LR locomotives.

== Brymbo branches ==
The GWR and WM&CQR (and its successor the Great Central) fought for traffic at Vron colliery, high in the hills about a mile from Brymbo. The GWR was first there, opening its branch in 1847. The WM&CQR constructing a short branch, opened in 1888, with a single platform passenger station.

The WM&CQR and GWR routes crossed at Plas Power.

This was one of the few branches on which the Great Central ran steam railmotors, but they did not provide the traffic hoped for and the service was withdrawn in 1917.

The WM & CQ branch closed for good in 1970, but not before several modifications. In 1954 a new connection was put in with the GWR branch at Plas Power and the link to Brymbo Works was re-opened to goods. It closed in 1958, only to enjoy a revival between 1965 and 1970. The connection had allowed the lifting of the section from Plas Power to Brymbo Junction of the WM&CQR.

== Receivership ==
In 1897 the WM&CQR went into receivership, brought about by financial manipulation by the Manchester, Sheffield and Lincolnshire Railway (MS&LR). The MS&LR had acquired a controlling interest in the WM&CQR after Piercy's death in 1889, when it acquired his shares.

The Manchester, Sheffield and Lincolnshire Railway reorganised itself into the Great Central Railway in 1897, and in 1901 it acquired the WM&CQR as well as the Buckley Railway and the North Wales and Liverpool Railway. The acquisition was authorised by Act of 22 July 1904, effective on 1 January 1905.

== Grouping and nationalisation ==
In 1923 the main line railways of Great Britain were 'grouped' by the Railways Act 1921 (11 & 12 Geo. 5. c. 55). The Great Central Railway was a constituent of the new London and North Eastern Railway and the WM&CQR lines and the Buckley Railway lines transferred to LNER ownership. The WM&CQR Vron branch became the most westerly branch of the LNER. The pit closed in 1930.

In 1948 the railways were nationalised and British Railways became the new owner.

== Closures ==
The WM&CQR network was heavily dependent on mineral workings, and as those declined so inevitably did the success of the railway operation. On 1 March 1917 the GCR passenger service to Brymbo from Gwersyllt was closed. The northern part of the Buckley Railway from Northop Hall Coal Yard to Connah's Quay LNWR Junction and Docks closed in 1959 and the Buckley Junction to Northop Hall section 5/7/65 and the track removed over the following winter. The extremity of the Brymbo branch continued in use until 1970, served from the former GWR line and a new connecting spur.

The Bidston line from Wrexham, and the Wrexham Central line, continues in use at present (2019). Colliery branches operated as follows: From Ffrwyd Junction: Ffrwyd colliery 1866 – 1930; Ffosygo Colliery 1869 – 1912; Brynmally Colliery 1867 – 1935; Westminster Colliery 1884 – 1925. From Brymbo Junctions: North Curve 1882 – 1966; South Curve 1884 – 1925; Gatewen Colliery 1882 – 1991; Plas Power goods: 1884 – 1956; From Brymbo: Vron Colliery 1888 – 1970.

== Locomotives ==
This is not a complete list:

- No.1 Wheatley, 0-6-0ST, ex-Buckley Railway, built by Hudswell Clarke in 1861
- No.2 Kenyon, 0-6-0ST, ex-Buckley Railway, built by Hudswell Clarke in 1862
- No.3 Chancellor, 0-6-0, ex-St. Helens Railway no.11 Tyne, builder unknown
- No.4 Lord Richard, 0-6-0T, built by Hudswell Clarke in 1863, rebuilt as 0-4-2T in 1889
- No.5 Sir Stephen, 0-6-0T, built by Hudswell Clarke in 1863
- No.6 Queen, ex-London and North Western Railway, built as 0-6-0 by Sharp, Roberts and Company 1846, rebuilt as 0-6-0ST at Crewe 1858, purchased by WM&CQR 1872, rebuilt as 0-8-0ST 1880, rebuilt as 0-6-2ST 1888, rebuilt as 0-8-0ST 1903
- No.7 (later No.3), ex-South Staffordshire Railway, built as 0-6-0 by Robert Stephenson and Company 1851, rebuilt at Crewe as 0-6-0ST, purchased by WM&CQR 1874, rebuilt as 0-6-2 in 1882, rebuilt as 2-6-0T in 1899
- No.7 Duke, 0-4-0ST, built by Hudswell Clarke in 1878
- No.8 Premier, 0-6-0ST, built by Hudswell Clarke in 1880
- No.9 Dee, 0-4-0ST, ex-Thomas Butlin & Co, Wellingborough, built by Hudswell Clarke in 1871, purchased by WM&CQR 1881
- No.10 Emily, ex-Broughton Coal Co., built by Beyer Peacock 1882
- No.11 0-4-0ST, built by Hudswell Clarke in 1885
- No.12 0-6-2T, built by Beyer Peacock 1885
- No.13 0-6-2T, built by Beyer Peacock 1885
- No.14 0-4-0T, ex-Newport, Abergavenny and Hereford Railway, built by Dodds 1854, rebuilt as 0-4-2T 1860, purchased by WM&CQR 1887
- No.15 0-6-2ST, built by Beyer Peacock 1888
- No.16 0-6-2ST, built by Beyer Peacock 1888
- Nos.17-26 0-6-2T, built by Beyer Peacock 1896-98 (actually owned by the Manchester, Sheffield and Lincolnshire Railway, but carried WM&CQR numbers and livery to enable them to exercise running powers over the Wirral Railway.)

== Location list ==
=== Buckley Railway ===
Closed from Connah's Quay to Northop in 1962; from Northop to Buckley Junction closed in 1965; the curve to the Holyhead line at Connah's Quay closed in 1954. The Mountain Colliery branch was opened from 1892 to 1965. The Dumpling Colliery branch was open from 1896 to 1902.

=== WM&CQR Original line ===
- Connah's Quay; opened 1 September 1870; closed 14 February 1966.
- Buckley; opened 1 May 1866; closed 31 March 1890; reopened June 1893; closed February 1895.
- Buckley Junction; opened 31 March 1890; renamed Buckley 1974; still open.
- Hope Passenger Exchange; opened 18 November 1867; later Hope Exchange; renamed Hope 1953.
- Hope curve connecting towards Mold closed in 1984. The Mold Railway closed to passengers in 1962 and to goods traffic in 1970. From 1970 to 1984 a tinplate works west of Mold was served from Wrexham over the Hope Curve.
- Hope Junction; opened 1 May 1866; renamed Penyffordd 1877; still open.
- Caergwrle; opened 1 May 1866; renamed Hope Village 1899; renamed Hope 1974; still open.
- Bridge End; opened 1 March 1873; later renamed Caergwrle (named Caergwrle for Castle and Wells until 1960s); still open.
- Cefn-y-Bedd; opened 1 May 1866; still open.
- Ffrwd Junction.
- Gwersyllt; opened 1 May 1866; sometimes Gwersyllt & Wheatsheaf; still open.
- Brymbo North Junction.
- Brymbo South Junction.
- Rhosddu; opened July 1906; closed 1 March 1917, but workmen's usage until 1923 or later.
- Wrexham Exchange; opened 1 May 1866; amalgamated with adjacent Wrexham General station under that name 1 June 1981; still open.
- Wrexham Central; opened 1 November 1887; still open; the Wrexham and Ellesmere Railway beyond here was open from 1895 to 1962, but a stub as far as Abenbury was retained until 1981 serving a brickworks there.

=== Hawarden loop ===
- (Shotton end-on junction with MS&LR)
- Connah's Quay and Shotton; opened 1 October 1891; renamed Shotton High Level 1953; renamed Shotton 23 August 1972 (after reopening ceremony 17/8/72).

NOTE MAP ERROR...the Borderlands Line passes OVER the North Wales Coast Line and there are joint stations at Shotton currently both open.

- Hawarden; opened 31 March 1890; still open.
- Buckley Junction; above.

=== Brymbo branch ===
- Brymbo; opened 1 August 1889; closed 1 March 1917.
- Plas Power; opened 1 August 1889; closed 1 March 1917.
- New Broughton Road; opened May 1905; closed 1 March 1917.
- Moss & Pentre; opened 1 August 1905; closed 1 March 1917.
- Highfield Road Halt; opened May 1905; closed 1 March 1917.
- Brymbo West Junction.
- Brymbo North Junction.

== Gradients ==
The Buckley Railway was on a falling gradient towards the River Dee almost all the way; 1 in 40 and 1 in 33 were the dominant gradients. The profile of the post 1890 WM&CQR route shows a climb at 1 in 80 from Gwersyllt to Ffrwd Junction, then falling at 1 in 86. After some undulations there is a climb at 1 in 84 from Caergwrle to a summit at Buckey Junction, then falling continuously at 1 in 53 to Connah's Quay.

The Brymbo branch fell from the terminus toward the main line at 1 in 35, 1 in 44. The colliery branches all fell from the colliery to their respective junctions at gradients as steep as 1 in 27.
