= Chester and Connah's Quay Railway =

Railway in England and Wales

The Chester & Connah's Quay Railway ran from Chester Northgate in Chester, Cheshire, England, to Shotton, Flintshire, Wales. It was in use for its full length from 1890 to 1992.

At Dee Marsh Junction it connected with the North Wales and Liverpool Railway. It then crossed the River Dee by means of Hawarden Bridge before joining the Wrexham, Mold and Connah's Quay Railway at Shotton.

== The line today ==
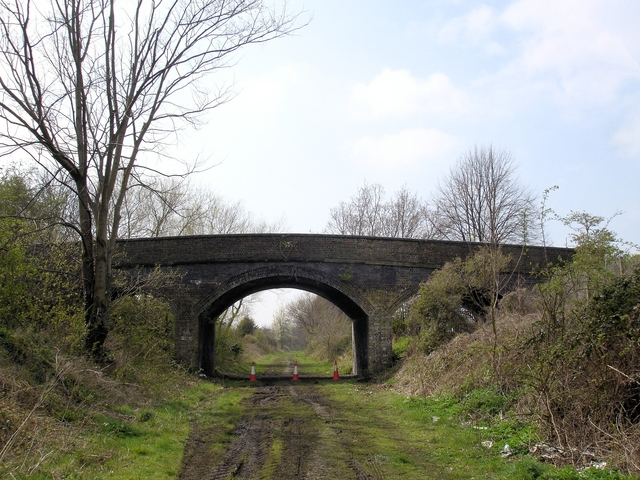
Trackbed of the former Chester and Connah's Quay Railway at Hoole, Chester

=== Open portion ===
The only section of the Chester & Connah's Quay Railway which remains in use is between Dee Marsh Junction and Shotton, forming part of the Borderlands Line.

=== Closed portion ===
The rest of the line closed to passenger trains in 1968, but remained open to freight trains until 1992. Even though steelmaking operations at the British Steel plant at Shotton ceased in March 1980, freight continued to use the double-tracked line until 20 April 1984. Goods services resumed on a single-track line on 31 August 1986 before final closure in June 1992. This was precipitated by the closure of Ravenscraig steelworks in Motherwell, Scotland, as freight trains using the line ran between Ravenscraig and Shotton rolling mill.

=== Cycle path ===
Since the line between Chester and Dee Marsh closed, the track has been lifted and the route is now a cycle path, forming part of Route 5 of the National Cycle Network.

== Junction maps ==
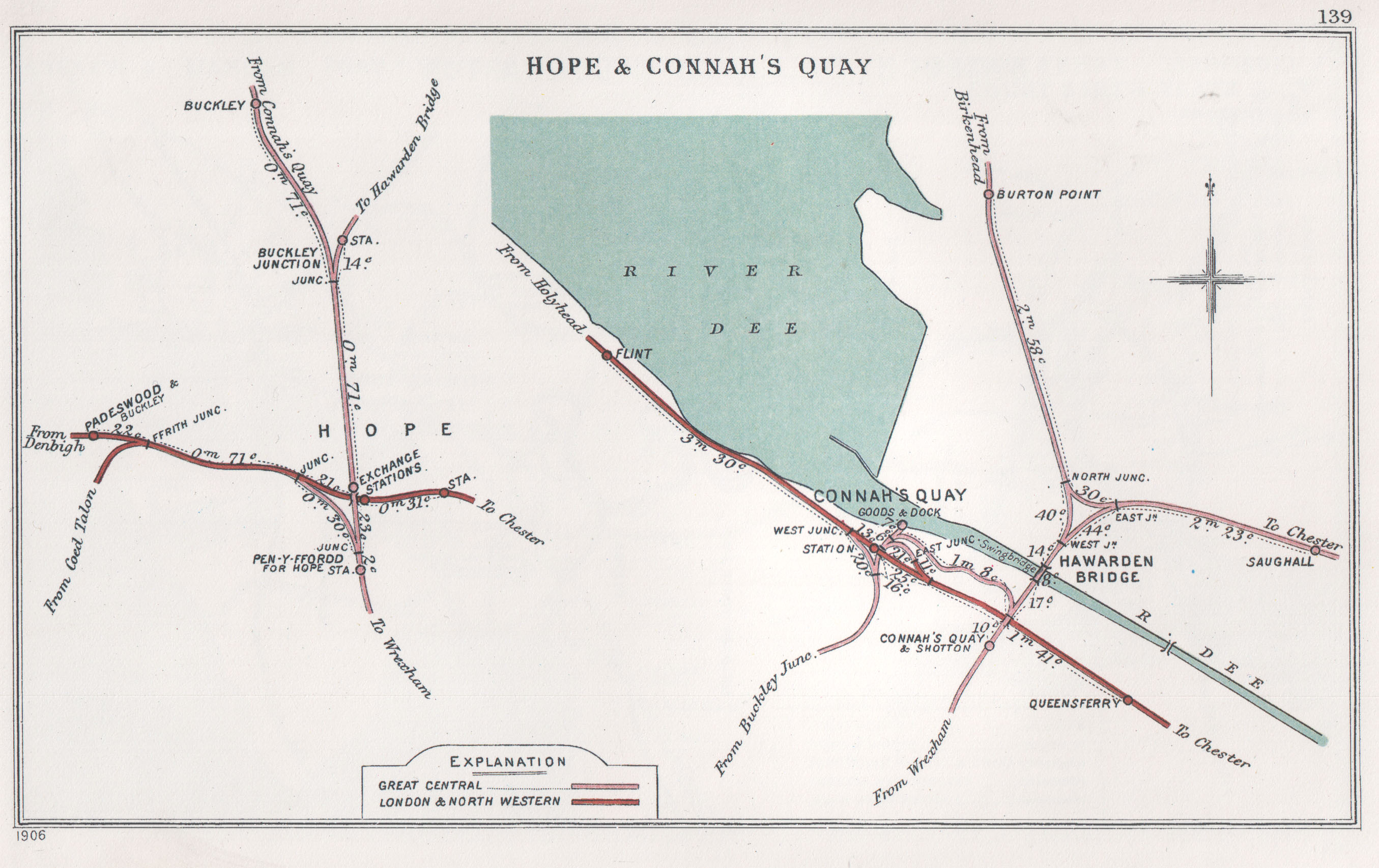
A 1906 map showing (right) the western end of the line around Shotton and Saughall

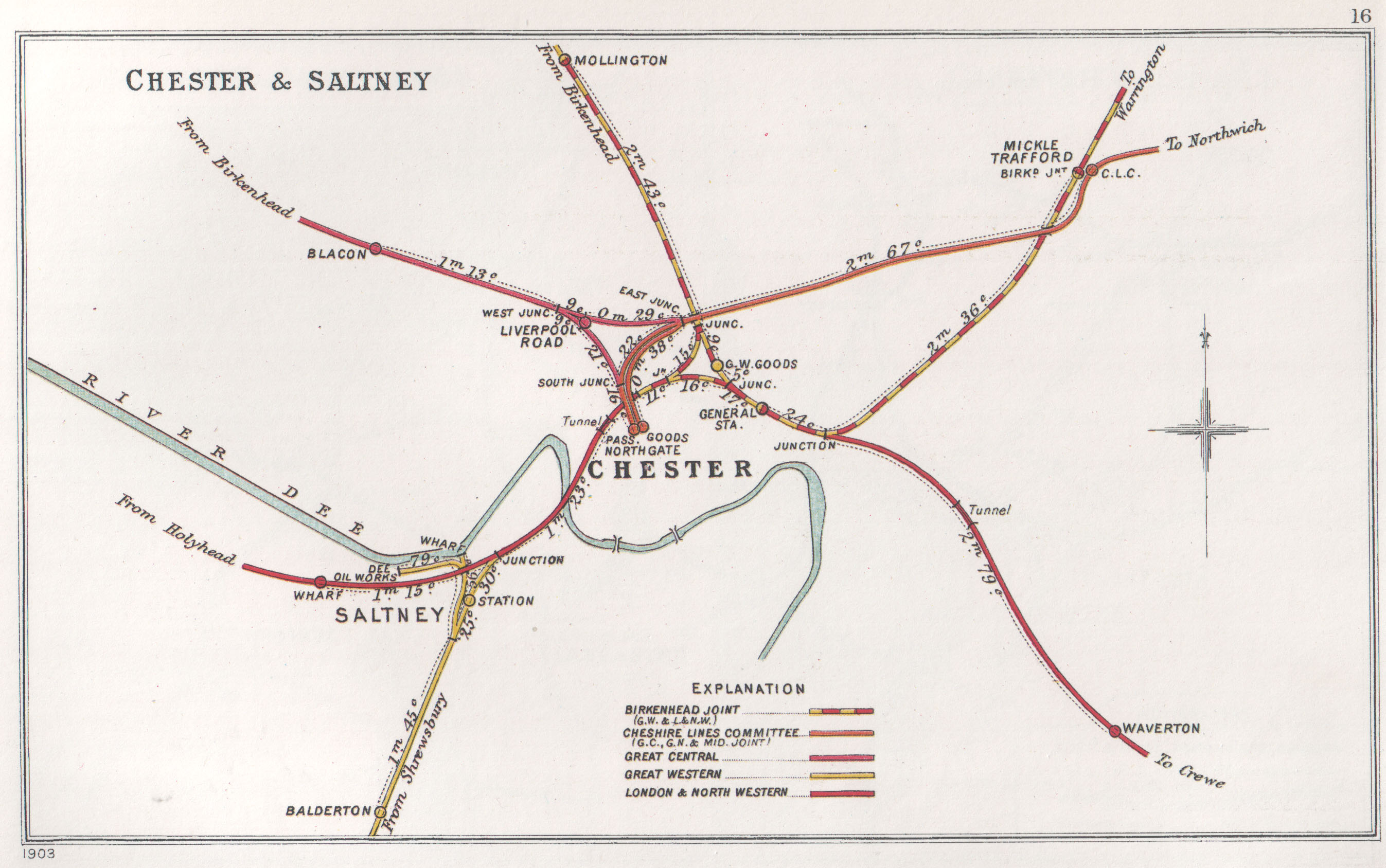
A 1903 map showing the eastern end of the line around Chester and Blacon

Railway Clearing House Junction Diagrams showing portions of the Chester and Connah's Quay Railway and neighbouring lines
