= Hope Exchange railway station =

Former railway station in Flintshire, Wales

Hope Exchange
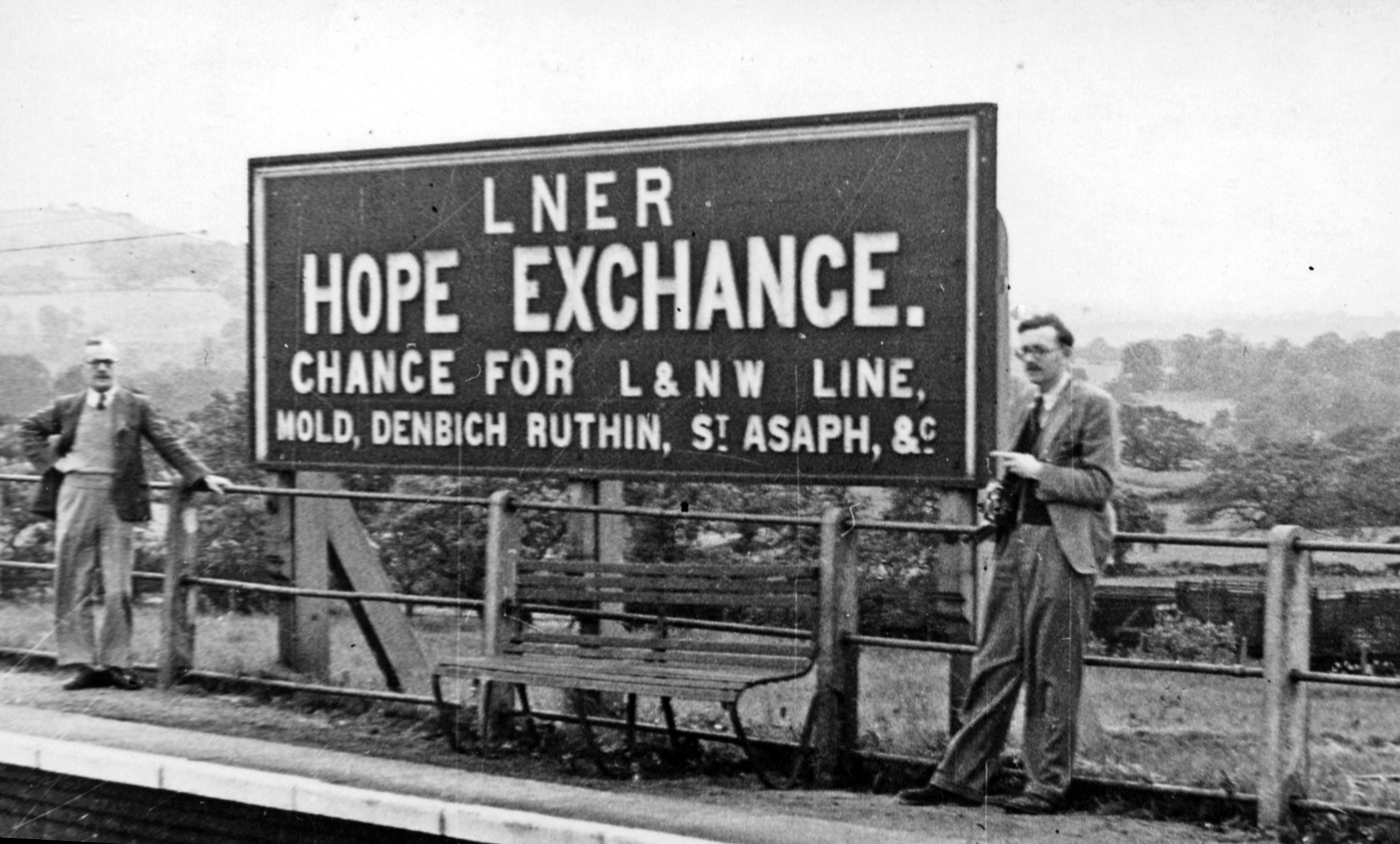
- Name-board at Hope Exchange High Level, 1948

General information
- Location: Penyffordd, Flintshire; Wales
- Coordinates: 53.1472°N 3.0548°W
- Grid reference: SJ296616
- Platforms: 4

Other information
- Status: Disused

History
- Original company: WM&CQR (High Level); LNWR (Low Level)
- Pre-grouping: GCR (High Level); LNWR (Low Level)
- Post-grouping: LNER (High Level); LMS (Low Level)

Key dates
- 18 November 1867: High Level opened as Hope Junction; Low Level opened as Hope Passenger Exchange
- c. 1878: Renamed as Hope Exchange
- 29 March 1890: High level line doubled, high level station rebuilt
- 7 November 1953: Renamed as Hope High Level and Hope Low Level
- 1 September 1958: Closed
Location

Hope Exchange railway station was located to the west of Penyffordd, Flintshire. The station was in fields with no road access, being an interchange between two lines. The high level section of the station opened on 18 November 1867 on the Wrexham, Mold and Connah's Quay Railway, and the low level section opened on the same day, on the London and North Western Railway. The high level platforms served what is now the Borderlands Line, and the low level platforms served the Mold Railway. The railway line to Hope Low Level was completely removed by 1982. The railway through Hope High Level remains in use as the Borderlands Line. The platforms on the Borderlands Line are still extant whereas the Mold Line ones have been demolished.

Preceding station	Historical railways	Following station
Penyffordd; Line and station open	Great Central Railway; Wrexham, Mold and Connah's Quay Railway	Buckley; Line and station open
Hope & Pen-y-ffordd; Line and station closed	London and North Western Railway; Mold Railway	Padeswood and Buckley; Line and station closed
