= Hawarden Bridge =

Bridge in Deeside, Wales

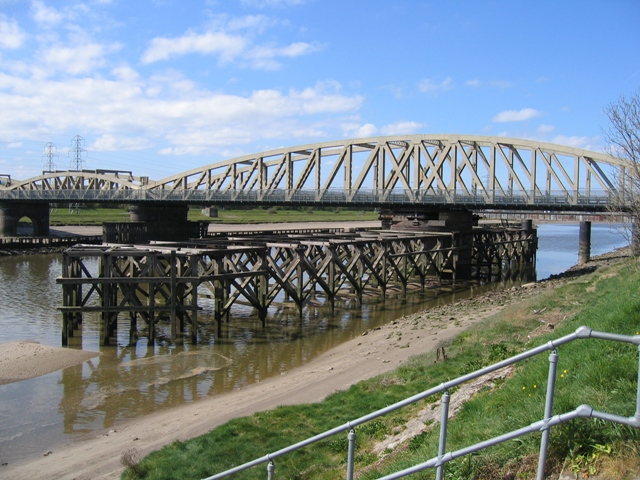
- Coordinates: 53.2172°N 3.0332°W
- Carries: Borderlands Line
- Crosses: River Dee
- Locale: Deeside
- Official name: Hawarden Bridge
- Maintained by: Network Rail

Characteristics
- Design: Swing bridge
- Longest span: 85 m (278 ft)
- No. of spans: 3

History
- Designer: Mr C A Hobson
- Construction start: 16 August 1887
- Opened: 3 August 1889

Location
- Interactive map of Hawarden Bridge

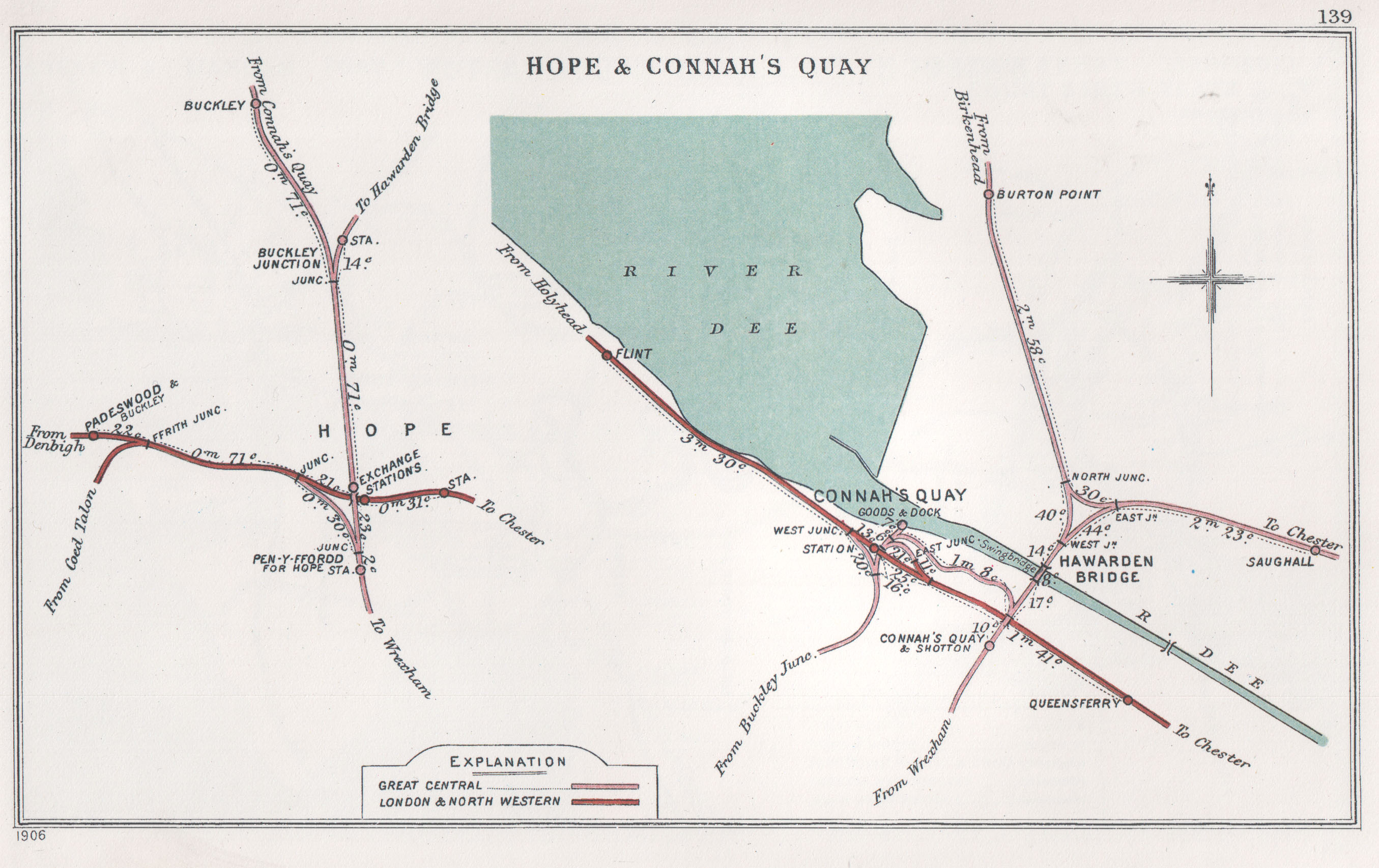
A 1906 Railway Clearing House map showing the bridge's location

Hawarden Bridge (/ˈhɑːrdən/; Welsh: Pont Penarlâg) is a railway bridge over the River Dee, near Shotton, Flintshire, Wales. It was built by the Manchester, Sheffield and Lincolnshire Railway (which later became the Great Central Railway), as part of the Chester & Connah's Quay Railway. It opened on 3 August 1889.

Hawarden Bridge is part of the Borderlands Line from Wrexham to Bidston. Hawarden Bridge railway station is on the north side of the bridge, while Shotton station is on the south side. National Cycle Route 5 crosses the River Dee on the path, adjacent to the railway line, which is on the bridge.

Upon opening, Hawarden Bridge became the largest swing bridge anywhere in the United Kingdom. It also held the high temperature record for Wales – 35.2°C, which was recorded on 2 August 1990, until it was exceeded in Gogerddan on 17 July 2022. However, it regained its high temperature record for Wales the very next day, when a temperature of 37.1°C was recorded at nearby Hawarden, some 5km to the south. During the 2010s, a major restoration of Hawarden Bridge was conducted, enabling both the speed and axle load limitations to be raised. It has been protected as a Grade II listed structure.

== History ==
During the 1880s, the Manchester, Sheffield and Lincolnshire Railway Company undertook the construction of a line between Chester Northgate and what is now known as Hawarden Bridge Junction. The most significant geographical feature of the route to overcome was the River Dee. It was decided to opt for a 165 meter-long bridge to cross over the river; this structure was complicated by the need to incorporate a means of passage for the tall ships that traversed the Dee at this time. The Board of Trade, advised by Sir George Nares, decreed that the envisioned bridge would need a single navigable opening of at least 140 feet. During 1886, an Act of Parliament was obtained for the construction of a bridge on this site.

Hawarden Bridge was designed by the civil engineer C.A. Hobson; he decided to opt for a metal structure, using steel, which was a recent but proven material amongst railway engineers of that era. The bridge was constructed by John Cochrane & Sons Contractors. The construction process took roughly two years and cost around £70,000 to complete. To overcome the challenging conditions of the estuary, the foundations were built using a series of brick-lined wells, a technique mandated by the project's chief engineer, Frances Fox. The bridge was officially opened to traffic on 3 August 1889; the opening ceremony was officiated by Catherine Gladstone, the wife of Prime Minister William Ewart Gladstone. Reportedly, Gladstone himself had laid the first cylinder in the river in an earlier ceremony to mark the commencement of the bridge's construction.

A key feature of the Hawarden Bridge was its central section, which was referred to as Span 10; this allowed it to function as a swing bridge. As originally built, it was able to rotate through 90-degrees to enable the passage of tall ships on the river below. The section weighed 764 metric tonnes, had a length of 85 meters, and took 40 seconds to move between its closed and open positions. The moving span was controlled from a manner on-shore tower adjacent to the bridge; this tower was demolished in 1976. At the time of its completion, this was the largest opening span of any swing bridge in the United Kingdom.

Presently, the bridge can no longer open, the span having been welded shut decades ago. The last time that Span 10 was opened was during 1960; the requirement for it to do so has been effectively made redundant by the relative extinction of the tall ship. While the remains of the rotating mechanism – hydraulic cylinders attached to a drive chain and sprocket – is still visible beneath the bridge, the pumping stations and their steam engines, which were previously used for powering such motion, have been demolished.

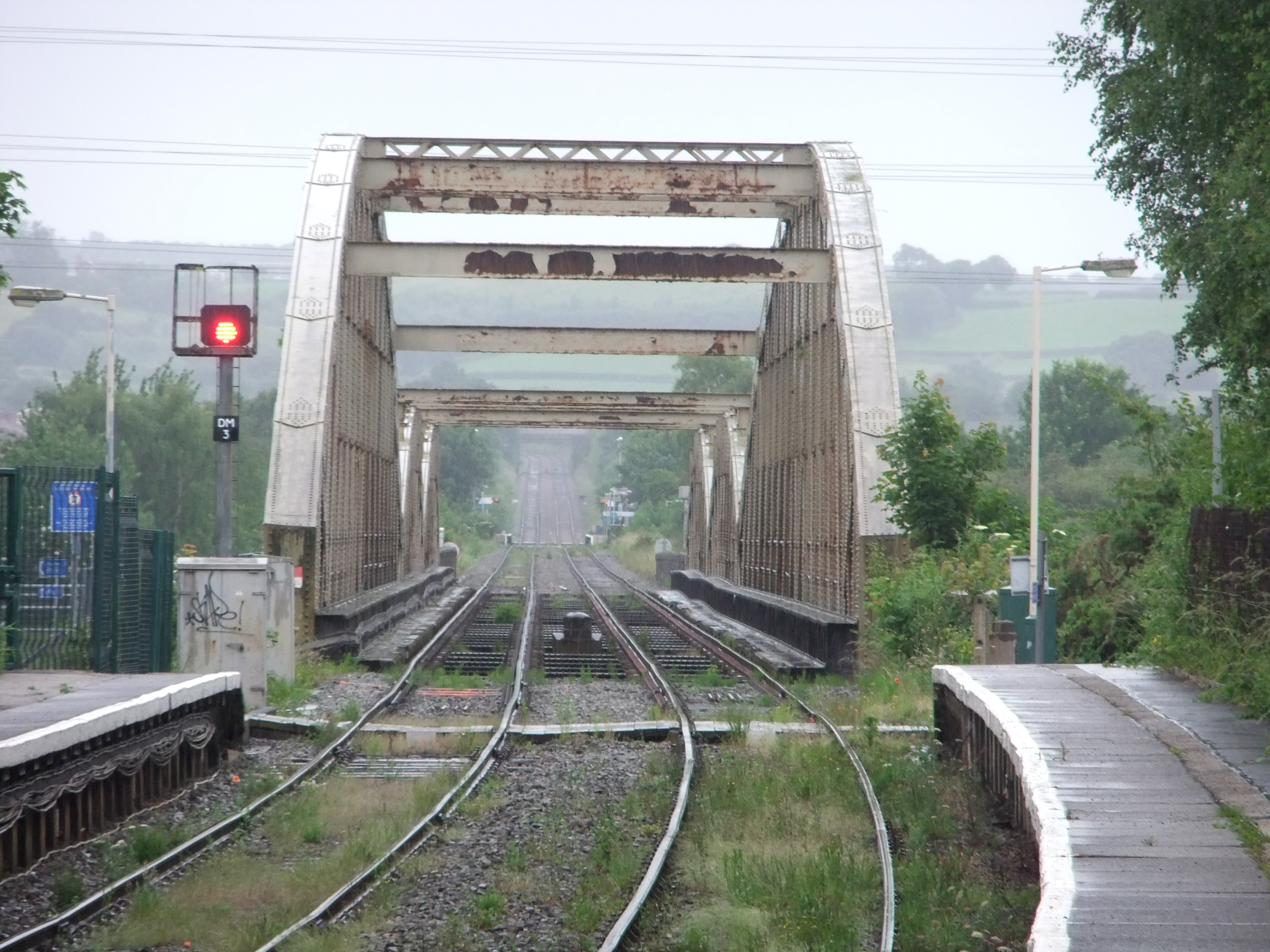
A pair of tracks crossing the deck of Hawarden Bridge

River traffic still travels underneath Hawarden Bridge. Perhaps most significant is the traffic from Airbus' nearby factory at Broughton; the large wings of the Airbus A380 superjumbo are transported from the facility on barges along the Dee roughly three times per week. These pass under the bridge before reaching the port of Mostyn, after which they are loaded onto larger sea-faring vessels for the trip to France.

Additionally, both pedestrians and cyclists may also traverse Hawarden Bridge via a dedicated walkway. The walkway, which connected between the Wales Coast Path and the Chester Greenway Railway Path section of National Cycle Route 5, is the responsibility of registered charity Sustrans Cymru. During late 2003, major improvements to the walkway were completed; these involved a widening of the crossing so that mounted cyclists could easily pass pedestrians, while cycle ramps were also installed at either end of the bridge.

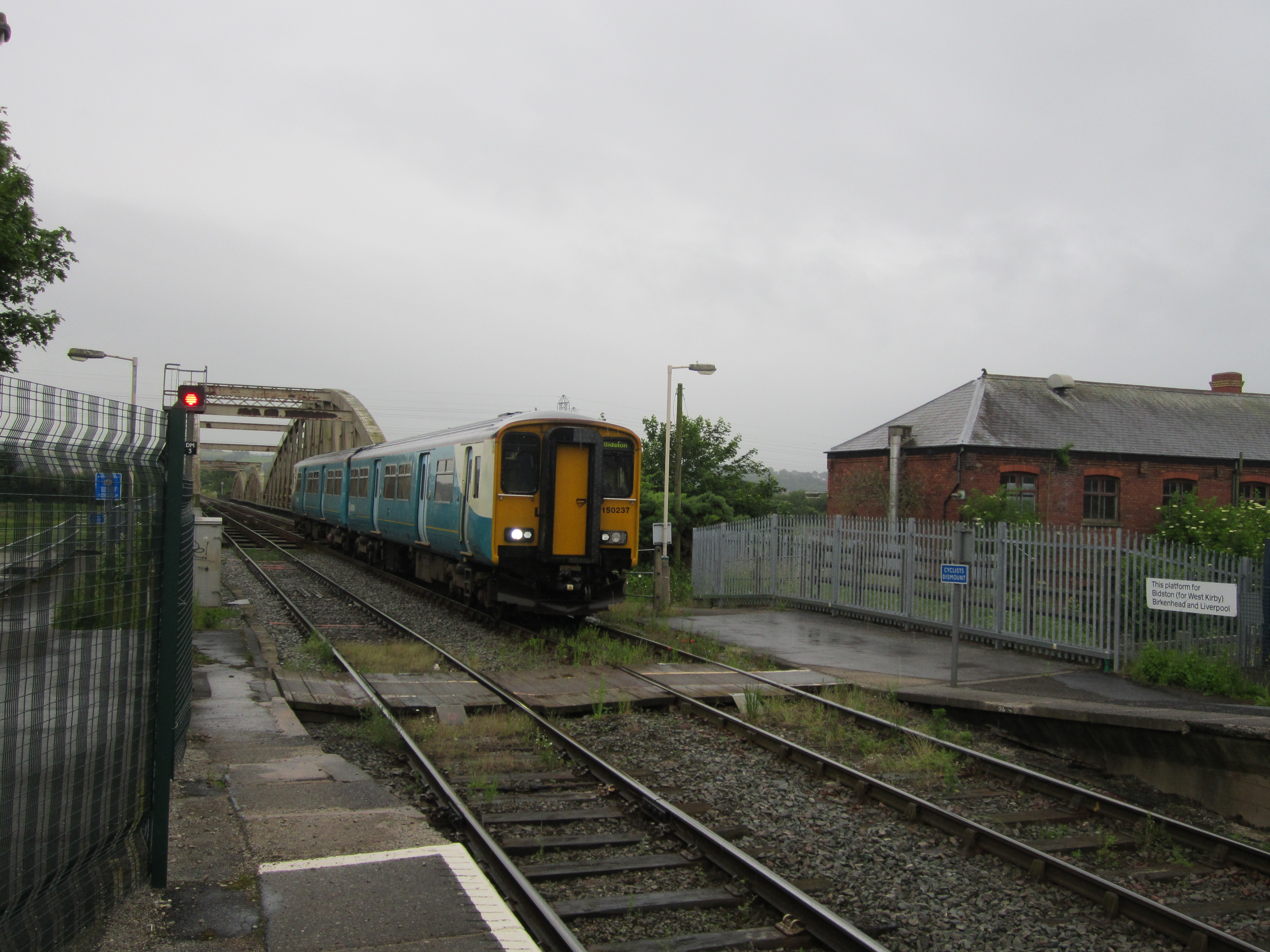
A train crossing over the Hawarden Bridge, 2012

Having been exposed to the harsh conditions of the Dee Estuary for over one hundred years, by the 21st century, the condition of Hawarden Bridge had significantly degraded. Erosion, primarily caused by a combination of saltwater and weather, was attributed for its gradual degradation. Accordingly, restrictions were imposed upon all rail traffic, such as limiting trains possessing an axle load in excess of RA7 to traverse the bridge at a maximum speed of 20mph; during its transit, only the one track could loaded. These operational limitations became a nuisance to operators; national railway infrastructure company Network Rail openly stated that they desired an RA10 rating for the bridge, which would impose less restrictions. In 2009, local councillors became concerned at the appearance of several cracks in the supporting brickwork of the bridge; following an inspection by Network Rail, its condition was determined to be safe and the damage to be largely aesthetic.

During the 2010s, it was decided to embark on a major strengthening and restoration programme of Hawarden Bridge. The work was carried out in two phases, strengthening was carried out before the erection of the soffit scaffolding, followed by abrasive blasting and repainting of the entire structure. Aluminium scaffolding was used as engineers had determined that the structure lacked the capacity to support heavier steel scaffolding. The bridge remained open to both river and rail traffic throughout, albeit with a 5mph speed limit being imposed upon the latter due to the tight clearances involved. By the end of the scheme, which was officially reached on 12 November 2014, the programme had cost £8 million to complete and involved the installation of 130 tonnes of additional steel, 12,000 tension control bolts, and in excess of 85,000 man hours. Reportedly, all of the planned objectives had been fulfilled, an RA10 rating has been instated while all operational restrictions upon Hawarden Bridge have been removed.

== See also ==
- List of bridges in Wales
- List of railway bridges and viaducts in the United Kingdom
