= Chester Northgate railway station =

Former railway station in Cheshire, England

Chester Northgate
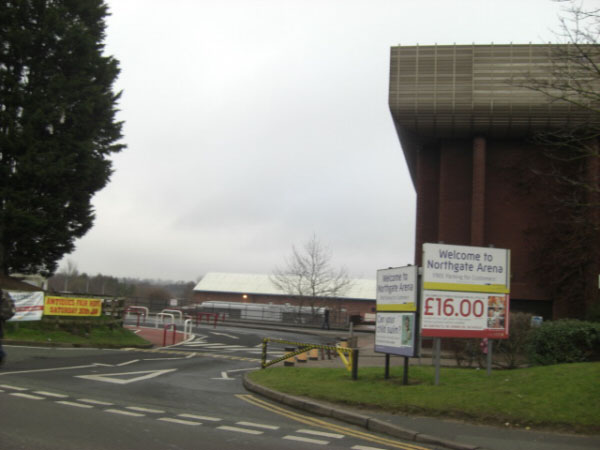
- The site of the former Chester Northgate station in 2010

General information
- Location: Chester, Cheshire West and Chester; England
- Coordinates: 53.1958°N 2.8921°W
- Grid reference: SJ405669
- Platforms: 2

Other information
- Status: Disused

History
- Original company: Chester and West Cheshire Junction Railway
- Pre-grouping: Cheshire Lines Committee
- Post-grouping: Cheshire Lines Committee

Key dates
- 1 May 1875: Station opened
- 6 October 1969: Station closed
Location

Chester Northgate is a former railway station in Chester, Cheshire, England; it was a terminus for the Cheshire Lines Committee and Great Central Railway. It was the city centre's second station, after Chester General, with regular services to Manchester Central, Seacombe and Wrexham Central.

== History ==
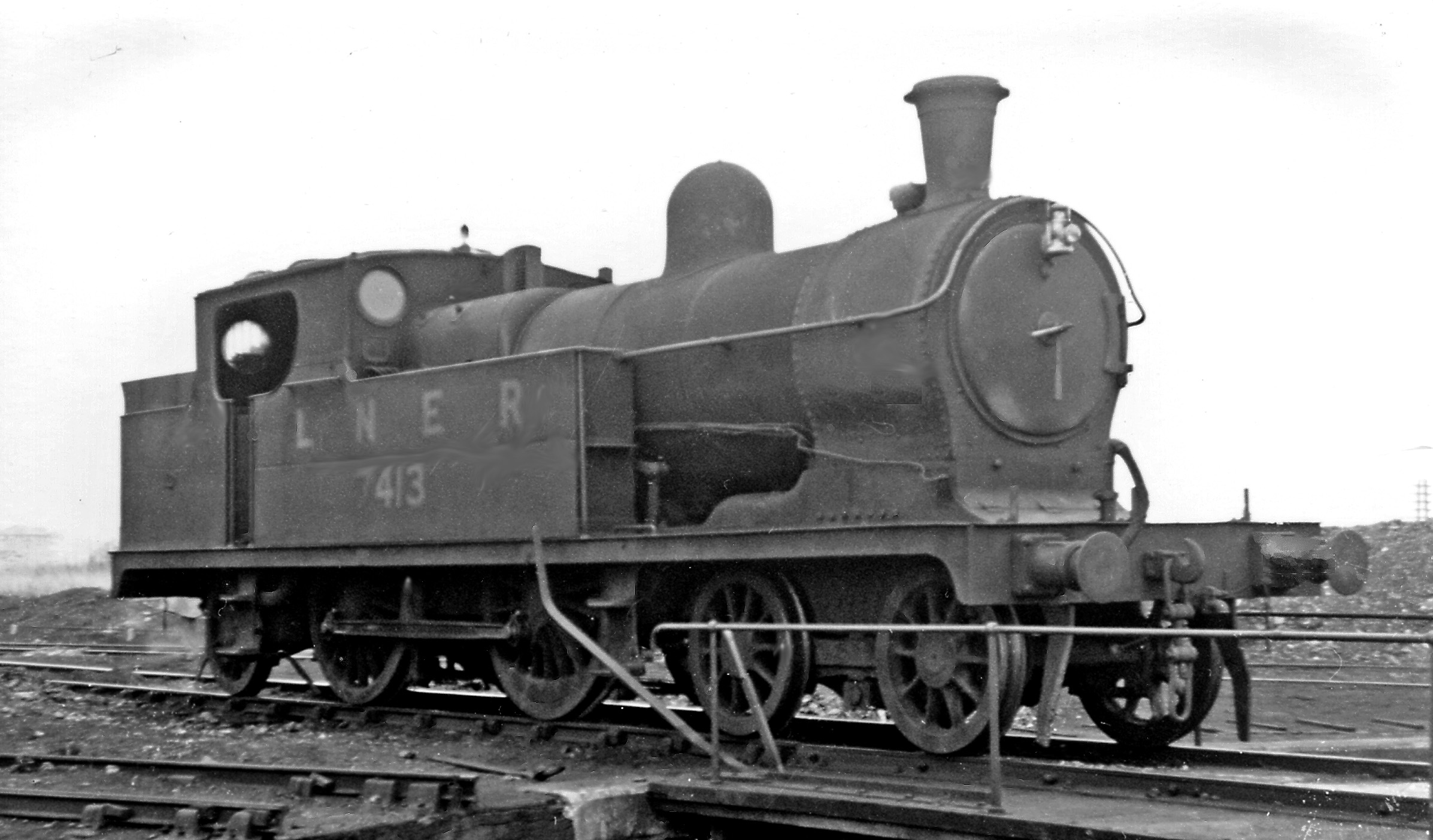
A former Great Central Class 9K at Chester Northgate locomotive depot in 1947

The station, which was located on Victoria Road in the Newtown area of the city, was originally planned by the West Cheshire Railway in 1865. A year later, the company was acquired by the Cheshire Lines Committee (CLC) which opened the station on 1 May 1875 for services to Manchester Central on the Mid-Cheshire Line via Northwich. The CLC track crossed the London, Midland and Scottish Railway and Great Western Railway line over a flying junction at Mickle Trafford.

Chester Northgate had a station building and a covered roof for each platform; it had four tracks with two side platforms, the central tracks being used to store carriages. One of the roofs had been removed by 1966. There were also lower level sidings that contained a locomotive yard.

In 1890, the Manchester, Sheffield and Lincolnshire Railway (renamed Great Central Railway in 1897) completed the 6 miles (9.7 km) Chester & Connah's Quay Railway to Hawarden Bridge. Services from Chester Northgate ran to Shotton High Level via Blacon and also to Wrexham General and New Brighton on the Wirral.

A triangle junction outside the station allowed trains to either terminate at Chester Northgate or pass through the city without stopping. During the Second World War, the station served military personnel that were based at RAF Sealand and at Blacon Camp.

In 1969, a level junction was installed at Mickle Trafford so that Manchester trains could be diverted to Chester General. Services to Wrexham and New Brighton had previously been withdrawn on 9 September 1968. The station closed on 6 October 1969.

Preceding station	Disused railways	Following station
Mickle Trafford East	Cheshire Lines Committee	Terminus
Terminus	Chester & Connah's Quay Railway; GCR	Chester Liverpool Road

== Railway line ==
Although Chester Northgate closed and the line to the station itself lifted, the line north of the station (avoiding Northgate by the Liverpool Road spur) remained for another 25 years. It was used by the British Steel plant at Shotton until March 1980.

Freight continued to pass north of the former station on a double-tracked line until 20 April 1984. Goods services resumed on a single-tracked line on 31 August 1986, before final closure in October 1992.

== The site today ==
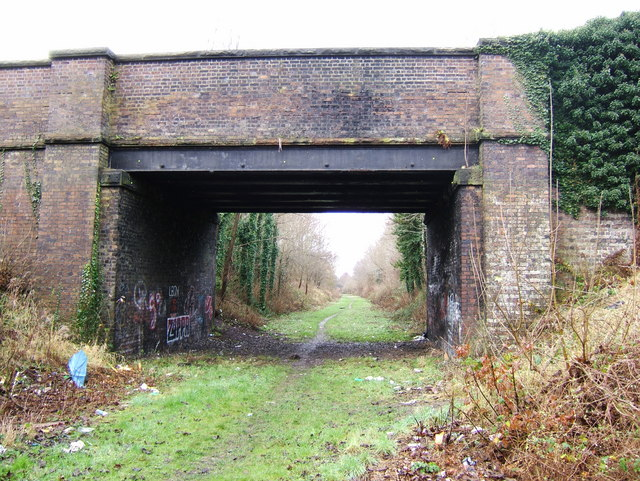
Part of the former CLC trackbed in Chester, as it appeared in 2007. The route has since been upgraded to a cycle lane

The site is now occupied by the Northgate Arena. Some of the original railway station railings can still be seen along Victoria Road, opposite the entrance to the arena.

The trackbed is now a footpath and cycleway.
