= Borderlands line =

Railway line between Bidston, England and Wrexham, Wales

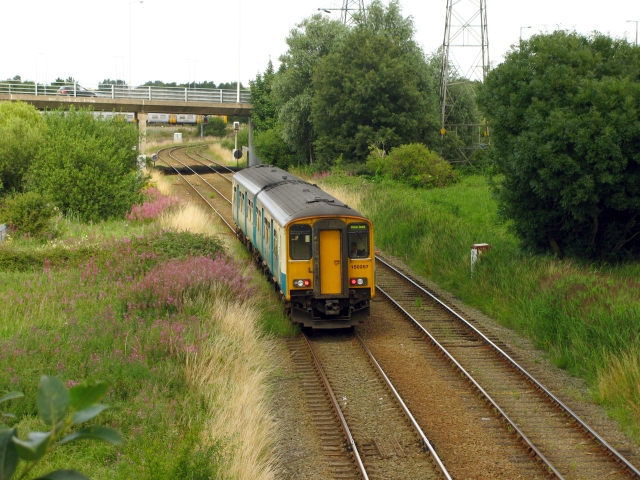
- A Class 150 DMU on the Borderlands line near Bidston

Overview
- Other names: Bidston–Wrexham line; Wrexham–Bidston line; Wrexham–Liverpool line (since 2025)
- Native name: Llinell y Gororau; Lein y Gororau; Llinell Wrecsam–Bidston; Llinell Wrecsam–Lerpwl (since 2025)
- Status: Open to passenger and freight use
- Owner: Network Rail
- Locale: Wrexham County Borough; Flintshire; Cheshire; Merseyside
- Termini: Wrexham Central; Bidston (Birkenhead)
- Connecting lines: Shrewsbury–Chester line; North Wales Coast line; Wirral line (Merseyrail)
- Stations: 15, with Wrexham General and Shotton as interchanges with mainline services, and Bidston connecting with Merseyrail

Service
- Type: Heavy rail
- System: National Rail; Wales and Borders franchise
- Operator: Transport for Wales
- Rolling stock: Class 230 D-Train; Class 197

Technical
- Line length: 27 mi (43 km)
- Num of tracks: Double track throughout except Wrexham General to Wrexham Central
- Track gauge: 4 ft 8 1/2 in (1,435 mm) standard gauge
Route map
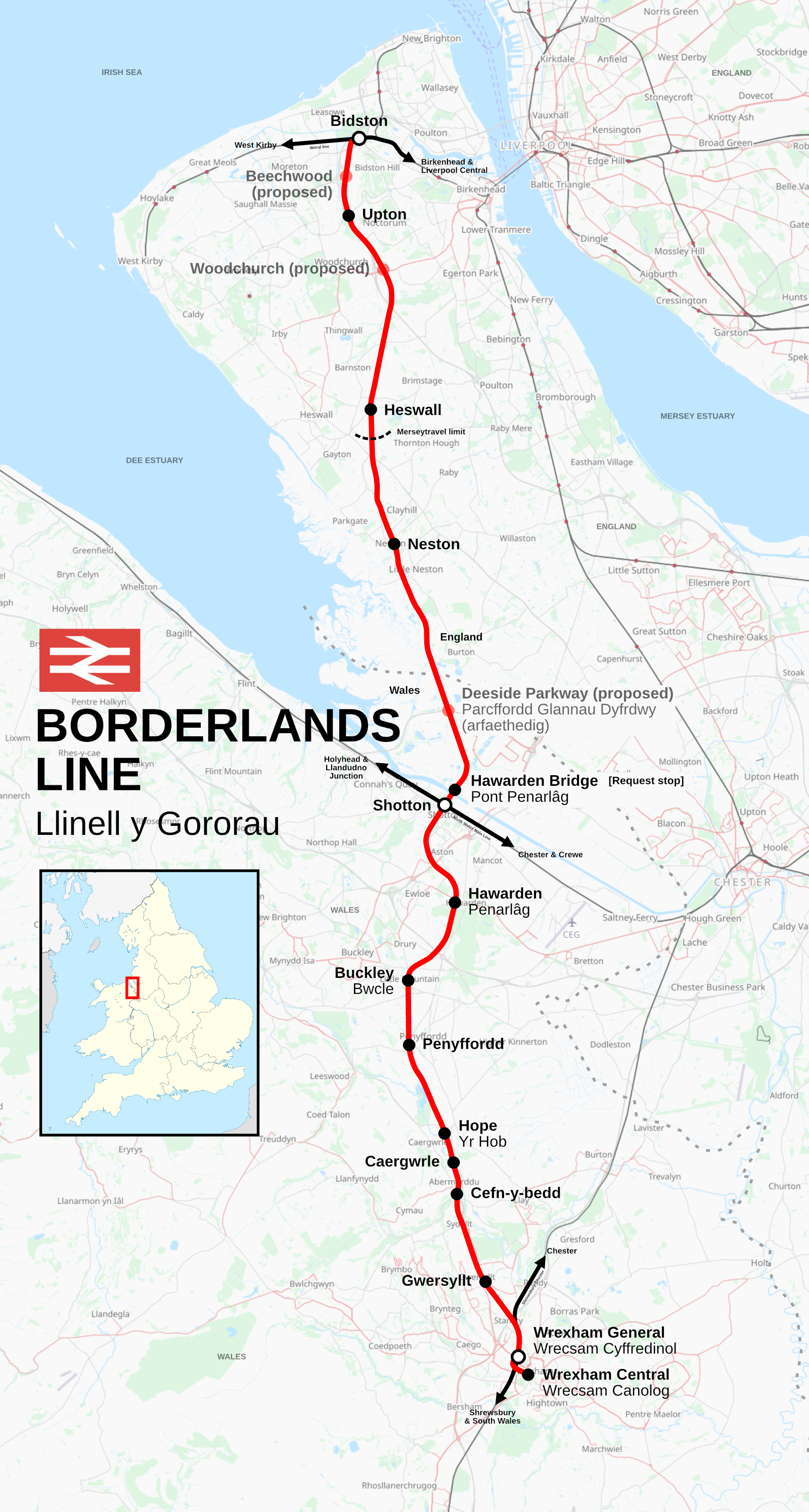
(Click to expand)

The Borderlands line (Welsh: Llinell y Gororau or Lein y Gororau), also known as the Bidston–Wrexham or Wrexham–Bidston (Note: Welsh: Llinell Wrecsam–Bidston, also stylised as Bidston to Wrexham or Wrexham to Bidston) line, is a railway line between Bidston on the Wirral Peninsula in England and Wrexham Central in the north-east of Wales. Passenger train services are part of the Wales & Borders franchise and are operated by Transport for Wales Rail. The line connects to the Merseyrail network at Bidston, the North Wales Coast Line at Shotton and the Shrewsbury–Chester line at Wrexham General. Parts of the line in Wales are used by freight trains, serving Deeside Industrial Park and the Hanson Cement works to the south of Buckley.

The line is part of Transport for Wales' North Wales Metro improvement programme and is also referred to in England as the Mid Wirral line, as part of the line runs in the middle of the Wirral peninsula.

The line is operated by the Class 230 and the Class 197.

There have been various proposals for the line to be fully or partially integrated with the electrified Merseyrail network to increase services towards Liverpool. Past proposals for electrification on the line were deemed unfeasible due to costs. The potential introduction of Merseyrail's Class 777 on the line could expand services on the line into Liverpool.

In May 2025, as part of the announced Network North Wales programme, the Welsh government announced they would refer to the line as the Wrexham–Liverpool line (Welsh: Llinell Wrecsam–Lerpwl).

== Operations ==
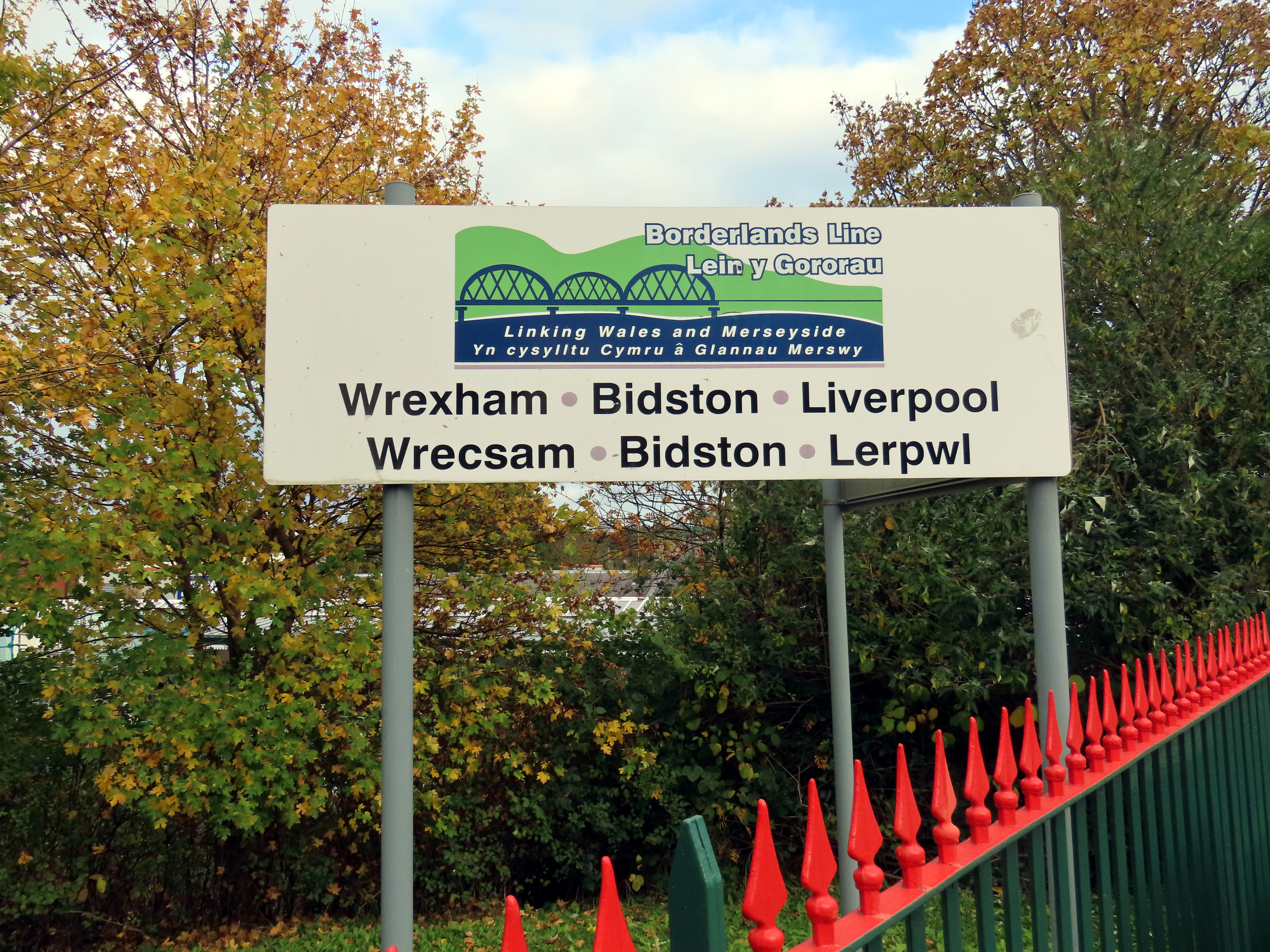
Logo for the line displayed outside Wrexham General

=== Freight services ===
The line is used by freight trains at its southern end in Wales, serving Deeside Industrial Park and the Hanson Cement works south of Buckley. Amongst the biggest users of freight was the Shotton steelworks which received imported iron ore from Birkenhead's Bidston Dock, until the closure of the steelworks in 1980.

=== Passenger rail franchise ===
Upon privatisation, passenger services were transferred from Regional Railways to North West Trains, later known as First North Western. In 2003, a review led to the creation of the All-Wales Franchise, meaning services were transferred to Wales & Borders Trains. Arriva Trains Wales succeeded Wales & Borders on 8 December 2003, and operated all passenger services on the line until October 2018. KeolisAmey Wales (trading as Transport for Wales) then began its franchise until February 2021, when publicly-owned Transport for Wales Rail took over. Potential electrification plans could see the line transfer to Merseyrail.

==== Passenger services ====
Transport for Wales is currently the only passenger train operator on the line. There are proposals for Merseyrail to fully or partly operate on the line.

In their December 2021 to May 2022 timetable, Transport for Wales operated 1 train per hour (tph) Monday to Saturday, and on Sundays services were mainly hourly with some every 1 hour and 30 minutes. Not all services terminated at Wrexham Central; some terminated at Wrexham General to enable cab cleaning, service turnaround time, or recovering delays. In the May to December 2022 timetable, the frequency remained at mainly 1tph, with all but the first morning and last evening service on weekdays, and two morning and two evening services on Sundays, stopping at Wrexham Central.

There are three interchange stations on the line, connecting to other railway lines and services. They are (north to south):

- Bidston, for Merseyrail services to West Kirby and Liverpool Central.
- Shotton, for services on the North Wales Coast Line between Chester and stations in north-west Wales such as Llandudno Junction and Holyhead.
- Wrexham General, for services on the Shrewsbury–Chester line from Chester southwards to Shrewsbury.

Holders of the Transport for Wales Concessionary Travel Pass can travel free along part of the line, from Wrexham Central to Hawarden Bridge. Holders of the Merseytravel Concessionary Travel Pass can travel free along the section of the line that runs through Merseyside, from Heswall to Bidston.

In December 2021, more than 500 people signed a Change.org petition calling for a direct service between Heswall and Liverpool.

The line is designated as a community rail partnership.

In spring 2023, some services were suspended after Transport for Wales transferred trains to other parts of their network. In June 2023, Transport for Wales committed to improve services on the line, with Lee Waters, Welsh minister responsible for transport, apologising for the issues. Class 230s were introduced in April 2023, although they were not running on-time and experiencing "teething" problems.

===== Recent service developments =====
It was initially proposed in 2018, that Transport for Wales would double the line's frequency to 2tph, starting from December 2021, using the newly-introduced Class 230 trains. In September 2021, this was delayed to May 2022. In May 2022, the planned timetable with the increased service was revised with the additional services removed, therefore any increase in frequency was scrapped for May 2022 and services remained largely unchanged from the existing timetable at roughly 1tph until December 2022.

In March 2021, Transport for Wales pledged to Flintshire councillors that the line's services would increase to 4tph and extend into Liverpool. The line's ageing track and signalling would also be replaced to allow for faster and more frequent trains. TfW also pledged to upgrade the facilities at the "fairly basic" stations on the line.

GB Railfreight (GBRf) operate freight trains to Hanson Cement near Penyffordd. GBRf formally objected to the increase in passenger train services on the line as it would conflict with the freight operator's new daytime freight traffic to and from Padeswood. The operator claimed that the new freight service would block the northbound line between Penyffordd and Buckley for 30 minutes due to the splitting of trains into and out of the short sidings.

Both TfW and GBRf have applied to the Office of Rail and Road (ORR) for use of capacity on the line. Transport for Wales Rail was seeking additional rights to operate a 2tph service on the line. Analysis by Network Rail taken in June 2020 concluded that a 2tph service could not be operated regularly in conjunction with freight services, therefore they would not support the awarding of access rights to TfW. Local councillors in Wrexham and the Wrexham-Bidston Rail Users' Association voiced concerns that the conflicting applications could jeopardise the planned increase in frequency to 2tph.

On 30 November 2022, the ORR approved TfW's 2tph passenger service increase.

In May 2025, Ken Skates, the Welsh Government Cabinet Secretary for Transport, announced their Network North Wales programme to develop the line. As part of the plans, it was announced they would refer to the line as the "Wrexham–Liverpool line" over the "Borderlands line", as well as developing its services. The programme aims to increase train services on the line from Wrexham to Bidston to 2tph within three years following the completion of rail line works at Padeswood. They further aim to increase direct services to Liverpool and up to 4tph by 2035. "Pay as You Go" systems are to be introduced along the entire line, with stations improved over 12 months and trains "wrapped" to reflect local communities and football clubs along the line. They also plan to advance development of the station at Deeside Industrial Park to determine its feasibility and test demand.

== Infrastructure history ==
Borderlands line diagram

The southern part of the line was built by the Wrexham, Mold and Connah's Quay Railway (WMCQR) in 1864 and the northern part by the North Wales and Liverpool Railway, a joint committee of the WMCQR and the Manchester, Sheffield and Lincolnshire Railway in 1896. The North Wales and Liverpool Railway northern terminus was at Bidston with the southern terminus at Hawarden Bridge Both railways were acquired by the Great Central Railway on 1 January 1905.

Two Wirral stations on the line closed in the 1950s; Storeton in 1951 and Burton Point in 1955. No trace of the station at Storeton remains, yet Burton Point station is still almost entirely intact, the station buildings currently forming part of a garden centre. Further south, the high level platforms of Hope Exchange closed in 1958.

The northern terminal of the Borderlands Line has been at four stations at various times: Bidston, Birkenhead North, Birkenhead Park (briefly in the late 60s), New Brighton and Seacombe.

== Development ==
The doubling of the journey frequency on the line is one of the aims of the Growth Track 360 group, a consortium of business, politicians and public sector leaders. The group aims to improve transport and create jobs in the North Wales, Merseyside and Cheshire area over the next 20 years. In the 2017 Autumn budget, Chancellor Philip Hammond stated that part of the additional £1.2 billion funding Wales was receiving would be used to look into proposals to improve journey times on the line and developing a business case.

In October 2019, Transport for Wales announced £280,000 had been allocated to revamp stations along the line in north Wales, Cheshire and Merseyside, as part of TfW's £194 million station improvement programme.

=== Proposed new stations ===
New stations at Deeside Industrial Park (to be called Deeside Parkway), Woodchurch and Beechwood have been proposed. The route was mentioned in Merseytravel's proposed 30-year plan of 2014.

"New stations at Beechwood and Woodchurch in Birkenhead (the latter "would be around junction 3 of the M53, the Prenton/Oxton side") and Deeside Industrial Park. These changes would "Incorporate the line into the Merseyrail Wirral line to provide direct connectivity with Liverpool city centre."

The draft of the Network Rail Welsh Route Study in March 2015 contained several suggestions for improving services on the line, including:.

- Replacing the High and Low levels at Shotton station with a dedicated interchange station, improving connectivity between the North Wales Coast Main Line & the Borderlands line
- The removal of level crossings to improve line speed.

=== Proposed electrification ===
There have been proposals for the full or partial electrification of the line since 1999 with participation of Merseytravel and the devolved institutions in Wales. (Note: National Assembly for Wales (now Senedd), Welsh Government and Transport for Wales) Such electrification is usually intertwined with proposals for the full incorporation of the line into the electrified Merseyrail network, allowing for services from either Wrexham Central or partway along the line to travel all the way to Birkenhead and Liverpool Central.

In 2008, a Network Rail study estimated the cost for third-rail electrification of the entire line to be £207 million. To lower costs, Merseytravel suggested overhead-wire electrification as an alternative, bringing estimates down to £66 million. However, this would mean trains running between Wrexham and Liverpool would have to be compatible with both electric systems, therefore incompatible with the third-rail only trains in use at the time.

There is political support to electrify the line from both Welsh and Merseyside authorities, but the responsibility of rail infrastructure lies with the UK Government's Department for Transport. The Welsh Government aims to increase services between North Wales and Merseyside, in particular Wrexham and Deeside with Liverpool and Liverpool John Lennon Airport. Whereas Merseyside authorities would like to increase services to stations on the line on the Wirral Peninsula in particular, as well as the rest of the line.

In 2016, a working group was set up to examine improving the line, including proposals to increase the frequency of trains on the line. It was hoped that an increase in the number of passengers would improve the case for electrification.

==== Alternatives to electrification ====
In 2017, Merseyside councillor Liam Robinson stated that passenger use on the line had increased 75% over the previous decade but electrification was still a long-term aspiration. He also stated that the new Class 777 rolling stock, which can operate on overhead wires, third rail or batteries was being procured for Merseyrail, and could run on the line. The Class 777 trains could extend the line into the Liverpool and Birkenhead tunnels and stations.

Welsh Government minister, Lee Waters, revealed in April 2023 that Transport for Wales have a Memorandum of Understanding with the Liverpool City Region Combined Authority to work collaboratively to increase connectivity between the two regions.

== Rolling stock ==
The line was operated using Class 150 DMUs, however Bi-modal battery electric diesel Class 230s operated by Transport for Wales entered passenger service on the line on 3 April 2023. They were originally set to enter service in May 2022 in conjunction with a possible increase in service frequency. (Note: delayed from 2020 due to the COVID-19 pandemic) On 1 July 2022, TfW announced that the Class 197s would be used on the line. The long-delayed 230s had its staff training suspended following a battery-related incident in April 2022, TfW stated they had targeted a late 2022 introduction as they aimed to restart the 230s' staff training programme in August 2022.

=== Battery trains ===
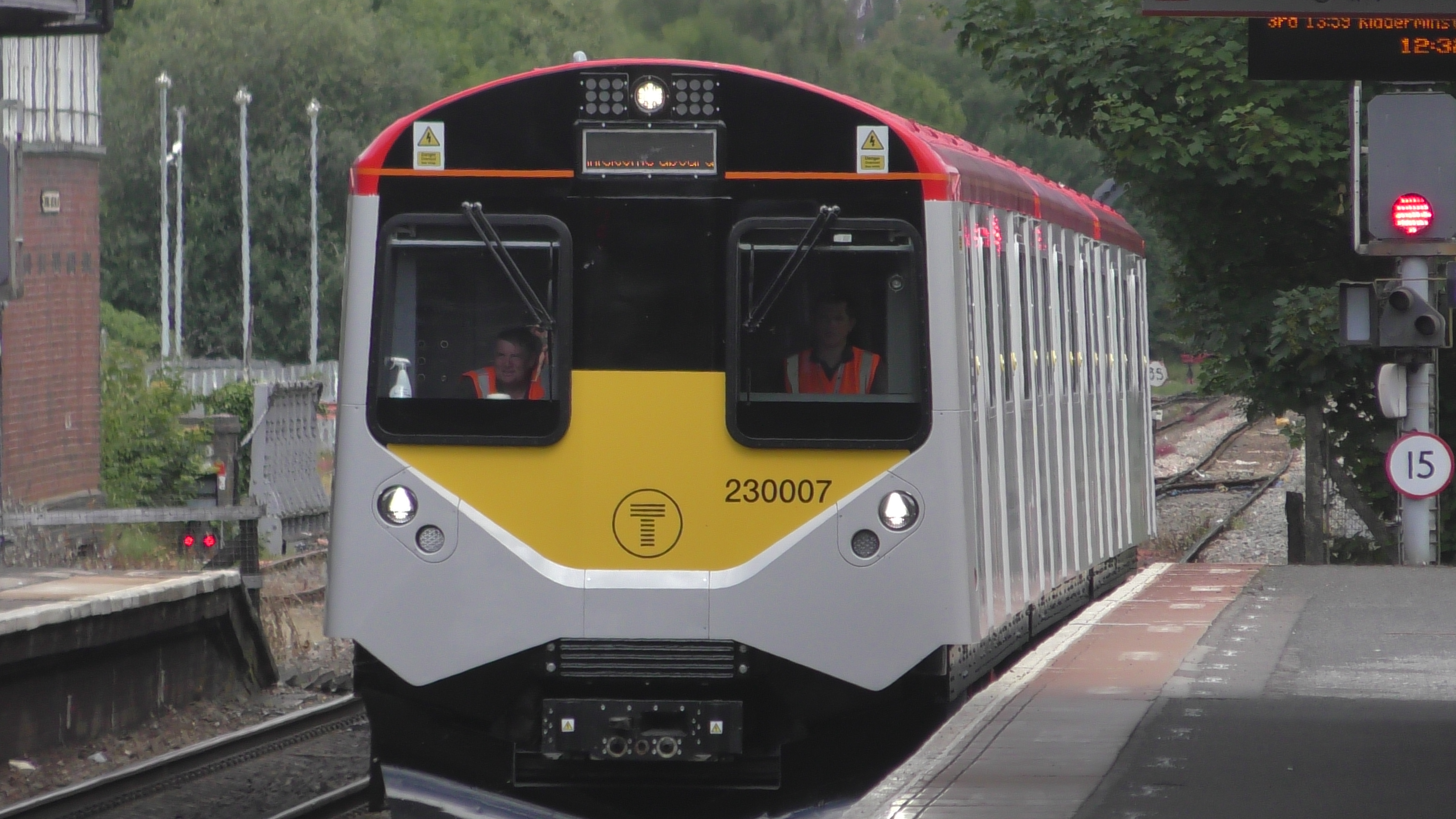
British Rail Class 230 battery-diesel hybrid at Stourbridge Junction, was introduced on the line by TfW

It had been proposed to use trains that receive energy from batteries and an electric pick-up on both unelectrified and electrified sections of the track. This would reduce the need for full line electrification.

A trial of a converted Electrostar train using energy from overhead wires and batteries when on non-electrified sections of track was undertaken in January and February 2015 on the Mayflower line. The train travelled up to 60 miles on energy stored in the batteries also recharging the batteries via the overhead wires when on electrified track, at stations and via brake regeneration. A month later in March 2015, the introduction of battery powered trains was proposed for the Borderlands line by Network Rail.

The Network Rail document suggested that consideration had been given to electrification and to extending the terminus from Bidston further into Birkenhead for greater connectivity. However these options were expressed as offering low value for money. The document proposes that using battery powered rolling stock precluding full electrification of the line, provides a cheaper method of increasing connectivity and extending the service into the electrified Birkenhead and Liverpool sections of the Wirral line. From the document:

"In the longer term, potential deployment of rolling stock with the ability to operate on battery power for part of their journey may provide the ability in an affordable manner to improve the service offering between the Wrexham – Bidston route and Liverpool."

==== Class 230 ====
It was announced in June 2018 that refurbished Class 230 trains, which use former London Underground D78 Stock train bogies and aluminium bodyshells with battery power plants and a diesel engine as a failsafe, were to be introduced between Wrexham and Bidston. Initially hoped for a mid-2019, then a December 2019 introduction, the trains were delivered by Vivarail to Transport for Wales in July 2020. The trains were later passed for passenger use for a 2020 introduction, but delayed initially to May 2022. In July 2021, one unit caught fire near Wrexham Central. In April 2022, Transport for Wales stated it continued to aim for a May 2022 introduction, but by mid-May, no Class 230 trains were introduced and the extra services planned to use Class 230s were later removed from the May 2022 timetable. Transport for Wales states that earlier delays to the introduction of the new trains were due to (aside the COVID-19 pandemic) "technical issues" such as fires on some of the tested trains and battery-related issues (such as a battery-related "thermal" issue in April 2022) impacting staff training, with the sheer length of a pause in training meant staff would have to re-do training. A social media interaction on Twitter resulted in Transport for Wales' Twitter manager stating that the trains are set to be introduced "in the next year" (2023). Deeside.com and Wrexham.com, local news websites, stated there is speculation that Transport for Wales have bought or leased Class 150s from another train operating company for the planned increase in services on the line.

The trains were scheduled to start operating on the line in May 2022, however, on 24 May 2022, the new Class 197s were spotted for compatibility testing on the line. Class 197s were not announced to be on the Borderlands line prior to the missed May 2022 introduction of the Class 230s. Class 197s were intended to only run long-distance services on the whole Wales & Borders network, which the Borderlands line does not interact with.

On 4 July 2022, TfW admitted battery-related "thermal issues" were the cause of the train's delayed introduction. TfW stated they have largely rectified the problem. The pausing of the staff training programme for a prolonged period of time, due to the incident, has led to staff being required to redo training. The class 230 trains were introduced in fare paying service in April 2023.

Following their introduction, the trains by June 2023, were still not running to their timetabled times, experiencing "minor technical issues" and "teething" problems. This was later stated to be due to pollen blocking engine filters. Following the issues with the services, Mark Isherwood, North Wales MS, had called for an operator other than Transport for Wales to operate the line, criticising TfW's management of services on the line.

There are aspirations to extend services from Bidston onto the Merseyrail Wirral Line taking trains into the Birkenhead and Liverpool underground sections.

=== Alternative future trains ===
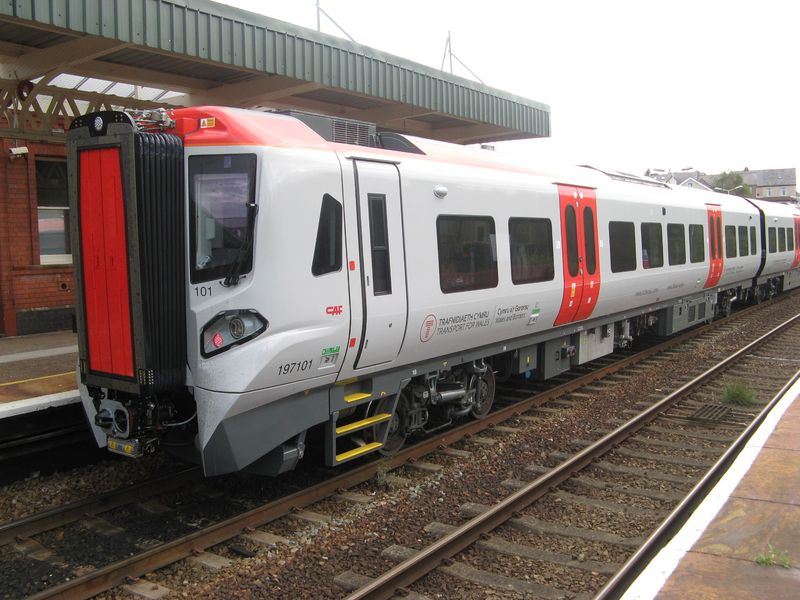
A Class 197 at Llandudno Junction, on the North Wales Coast Line, north-west Wales in October 2021

==== Class 197s ====
On 1 July 2022, Transport for Wales announced that the Class 197s would be operating on the line when they are eventually introduced to the wider Wales and Borders rail network. The class were not initially announced to be operating on the line when they first entered testing in late 2021, with Transport for Wales stating, at the time, that the 230s would be the line's main rolling stock. The Class 197s were spotted being tested on the line in May 2022, after the initial deadline for the 230s' May introduction had passed when the May–December 2022 timetable commenced.

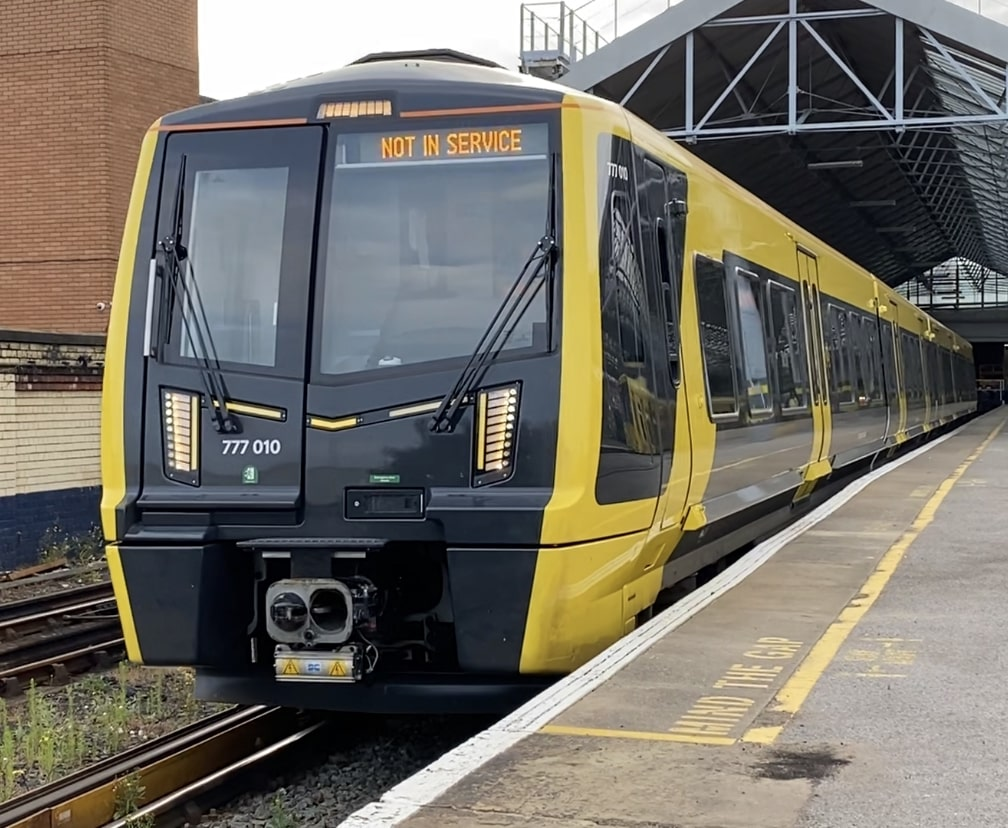
Class 777 of Merseyrail, proposed for use on the line

==== Merseyrail trains ====
The Liverpool City Region Combined Authority announced that trials of the seven battery electric multiple unit (BEMU) versions of their new Class 777 had shown that they were capable of travelling up to 20 miles (32 km) between charges. Further trials by Stadler reached a range of 84 miles (135 km). This would allow the line to be served without full electrification.
