= Wirral line =

Commuter rail route in Merseyside, England

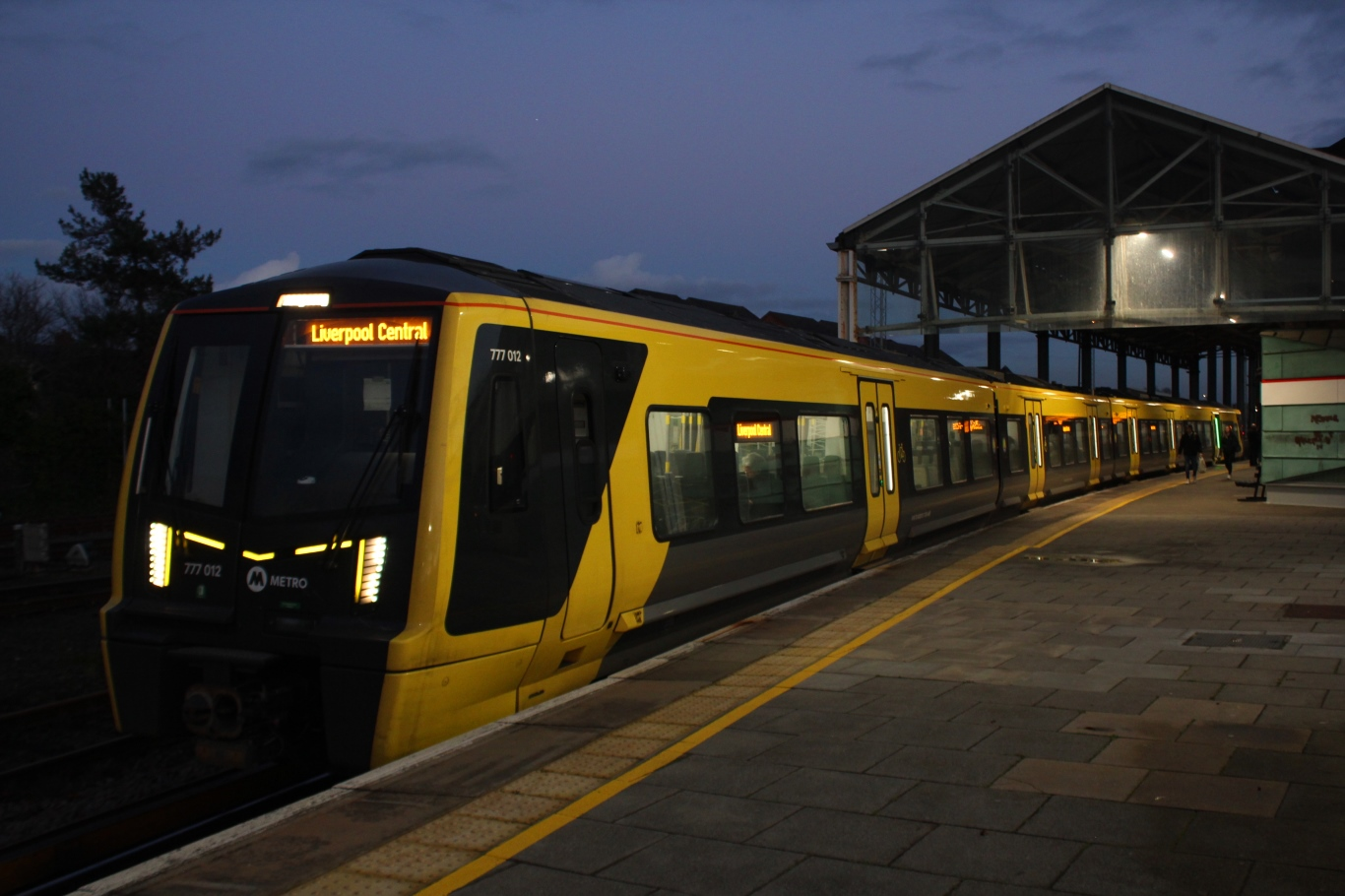
- A Class 777 EMU on a Wirral line service preparing to depart Chester.

Overview
- Status: Operational
- Owner: Network Rail
- Locale: Merseyside; Cheshire
- Termini: Chester; Ellesmere Port; New Brighton; West Kirby
- Stations: 34

Service
- Type: Commuter rail
- System: National Rail
- Operator: Merseyrail
- Depot: Birkenhead North TMD
- Rolling stock: Class 777

Technical
- Line length: 33 miles 46 chains (54.0 km)
- Num of tracks: Two (One through loop tunnel)
- Track gauge: 4 ft 8 1/2 in (1,435 mm) standard gauge
- Loading gauge: W6
- Electrification: 750 V DC third rail
- Operating speed: 70 mph (110 km/h) maximum
Route map
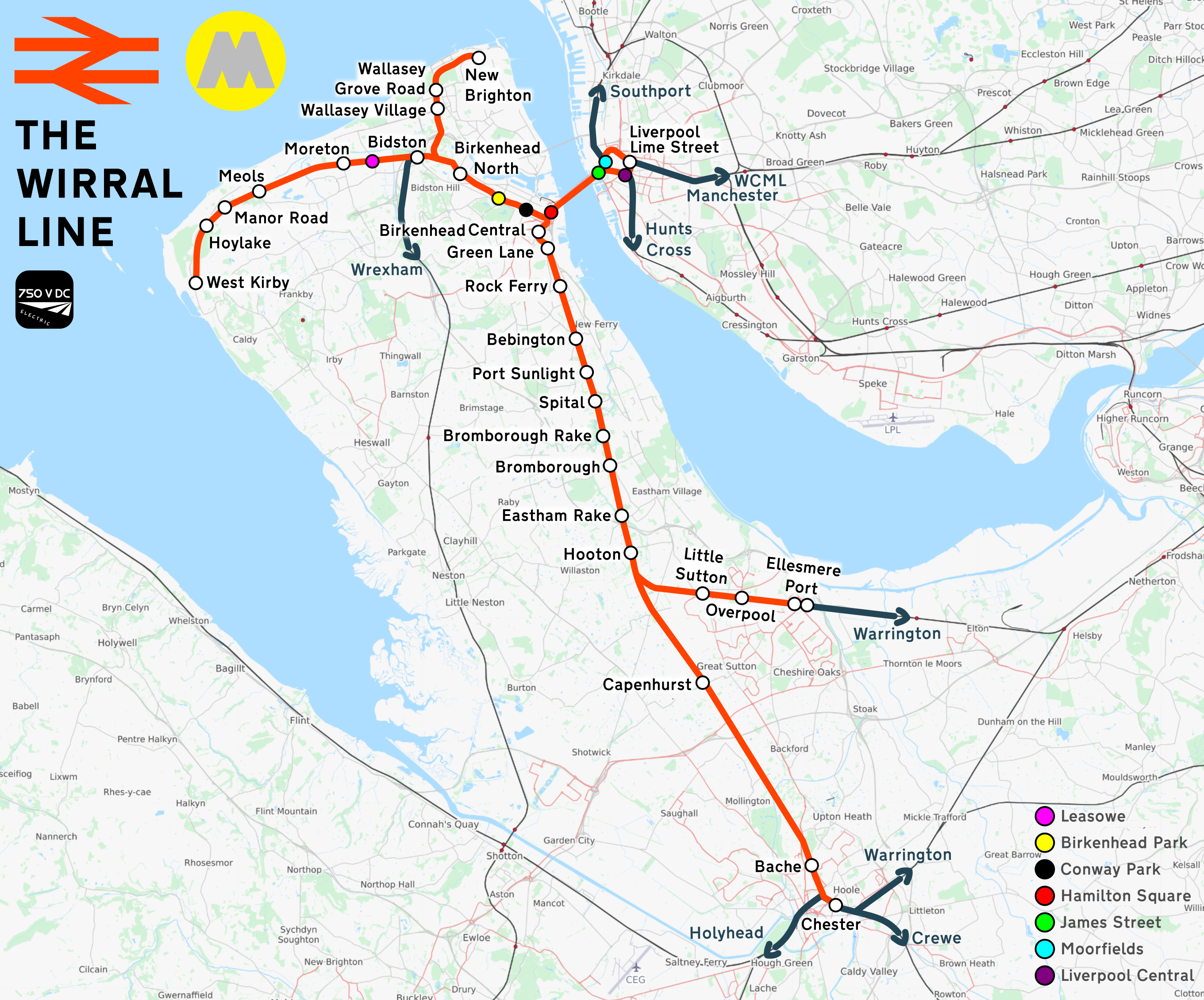

The Wirral line is one of two commuter rail routes operated by Merseyrail and centred on Merseyside, England, the other being the Northern line.

The Wirral line connects Liverpool to the Wirral Peninsula via the Mersey Railway Tunnel, with branches to New Brighton, West Kirby, Chester and Ellesmere Port. Beneath Liverpool, the line follows a clockwise circular route in a single-track tunnel called the Loop, built in the early 1970s.

The Wirral line has carried its present name since the opening of the Merseyrail network by Queen Elizabeth II on 25 October 1978, during the British Rail period. The Wirral line is fully electrified with a DC third rail, and has existed in its current form since May 1994 with the start of electric services to Ellesmere Port. A total of 34 stations are served, with connections available to mainline services at Liverpool Lime Street, Bidston, Ellesmere Port and Chester. The line also connects with the Northern line of the Merseyrail network at Liverpool Central and Moorfields.

== History ==
The Wirral line was not originally conceived as a single route, but uses several railway lines built by individual private railway companies. Even after the Grouping Act of 1921, three of the Big Four companies were active on the Wirral Peninsula until the nationalisation of the railways in 1948, when all four were absorbed into British Railways. During the 1970s, under British Rail, the Merseyrail network was developed. Privatisation during the 1990s has resulted in services once again being run by private operators.

=== Pre-grouping ===
==== Chester and Birkenhead Railway ====
Part of the Chester and Birkenhead Railway forms the oldest section of today's Wirral line. The route between the two settlements was surveyed by George Stephenson in 1830, but the railway company itself was not incorporated until 12 July 1837, after a previous bill had been rejected a few months earlier. Between 1830 and 1837, an alternative route was surveyed by Francis Giles, but Stephenson's plans were favoured. Construction work started in May 1838 and was allocated to three different contractors. By October 1839, over 900 navvies and 40 horses were employed on the southern 5 miles 37 chains (8.8 km) of the route, which included the construction of Mollington Viaduct over the Shropshire Union Canal at Moston, now Grade II listed. In 2011 this viaduct underwent strengthening work at a cost of around £800,000. The total cost of the railway was around £513,000, more than double the original estimate of £250,000, and the full length of 14 miles 71 3/4 chains (23.97 km) opened as a single-track line on 23 September 1840 between temporary termini at Grange Lane in Birkenhead and Brook Street in Chester, close to the present location of Chester railway station. The inaugural service was operated by locomotive "The Wirral", taking 50 minutes to travel the length of the line from Birkenhead. In 1842, the company purchased Monks Ferry station and extended the railway north from Grange Lane to reach the new combined rail and ferry terminal, which opened on 23 October 1844. On 22 July 1847, the line was merged with the Birkenhead, Lancashire and Cheshire Railway into the Birkenhead, Lancashire and Cheshire Junction Railway, who doubled the track. Chester General station opened a year later on 1 August 1848, still extant today as the southern terminus of the Wirral line and renamed to simply "Chester" in 1969 following the closure of Chester's other station, Chester Northgate. In 1859, the Birkenhead, Lancashire and Cheshire Junction Railway shortened its name to become the Birkenhead Railway, but was taken over in 1860 by the Great Western Railway (GWR) and the London and North Western Railway (LNWR), who operated the line as a joint affair known as the Birkenhead Joint Railway. Birkenhead Woodside station opened on 31 March 1878 as a new terminus to replace the facilities at Monks Ferry. To connect the new station to the railway, a 0.5 miles (0.80 km) tunnel was dug using the cut and cover method.

==== Wirral Railway ====
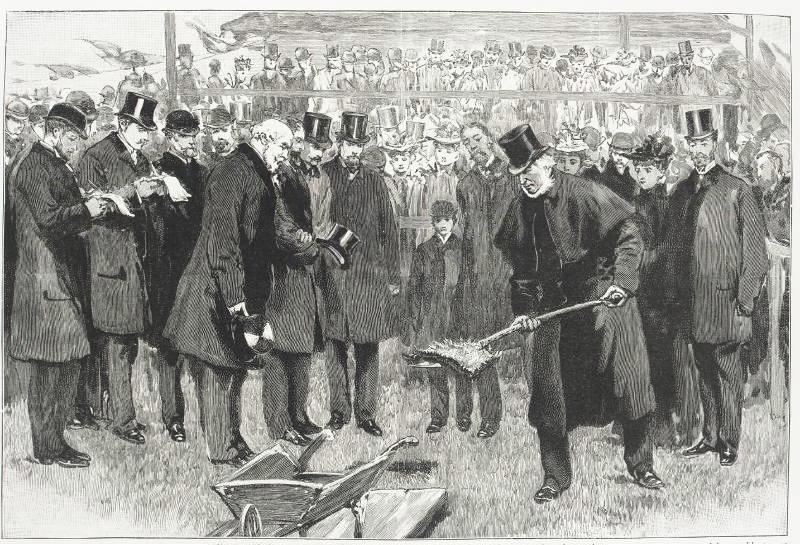
The ceremony of cutting of the first sod of the Wirral Railway by William Gladstone.

On 28 July 1863, the Hoylake Railway was incorporated due to the Hoylake Railway Act 1863 being granted royal assent, which authorised the construction of a railway line between Birkenhead and Hoylake. A 5 miles 22 chains (8.5 km) single track line was constructed between Hoylake and Birkenhead Dock (adjacent to Wallasey Bridge Road), and the railway opened to passengers on 2 July 1866. The railway had ambitious plans that included the construction of a bridge across the Dee Estuary to join the LNWR North Wales Coast Line at Mostyn, but due to financial difficulties the company went into receivership on 13 February 1869. The railway was bought by the Hoylake and Birkenhead Tramway Company, who passed a bill for a new tramway from the Bridge Road station to Woodside Ferry Terminal on 18 July 1872. The Hoylake Railway reopened on 1 August 1872, and in 1878 was extended to West Kirby to the west and an interchange with the tramway and the Mersey Docks and Harbour Board railway system to the east where Birkenhead Dock station had been built. The tramway was sold to the Birkenhead Tramways Company on 11 October 1879 which was already operating other tramways in Birkenhead. On 18 July 1881, the railway became the Seacombe, Hoylake & Deeside Railway Company and acts were passed for lines to Seacombe, Deeside and Warren Drive, later extended to New Brighton. Before these extensions were complete, the railway became the Wirral Railway Company and a decision was made to double the track as far as the western terminus at West Kirby.

Whilst the new lines to Seacombe and New Brighton were being surveyed and built, a new joint company, later to become the North Wales and Liverpool Railway Company (NW&LR), took over the construction of the Deeside line due to a lack of Wirral Railway funds. The planned NW&LR route would pass through the heart of the Wirral Peninsula from Bidston on the Wirral Railway to Hawarden Bridge in Flintshire, Wales where it would meet the Chester and Connah's Quay Railway and the Wrexham, Mold and Connah's Quay Railway (WM&CQR). The North Wales and Liverpool Railway opened for passengers on 18 May 1896, but powers to extend the service from Bidston to the more appealing destination of Seacombe were not granted until 1898. The NW&LR and WM&CQR were both acquired by the Great Central Railway (GCR) on 1 January 1905, and due to a high level of goods traffic the GCR opened a new connection to the docks in 1907 as part of what forms the now-disused Birkenhead Dock Branch. Today, the railway from Bidston to Hawarden Bridge forms the northern part of the Borderlands line which is the only railway line on the Wirral that does not form a part of the present-day Wirral line.

==== Mersey Railway ====
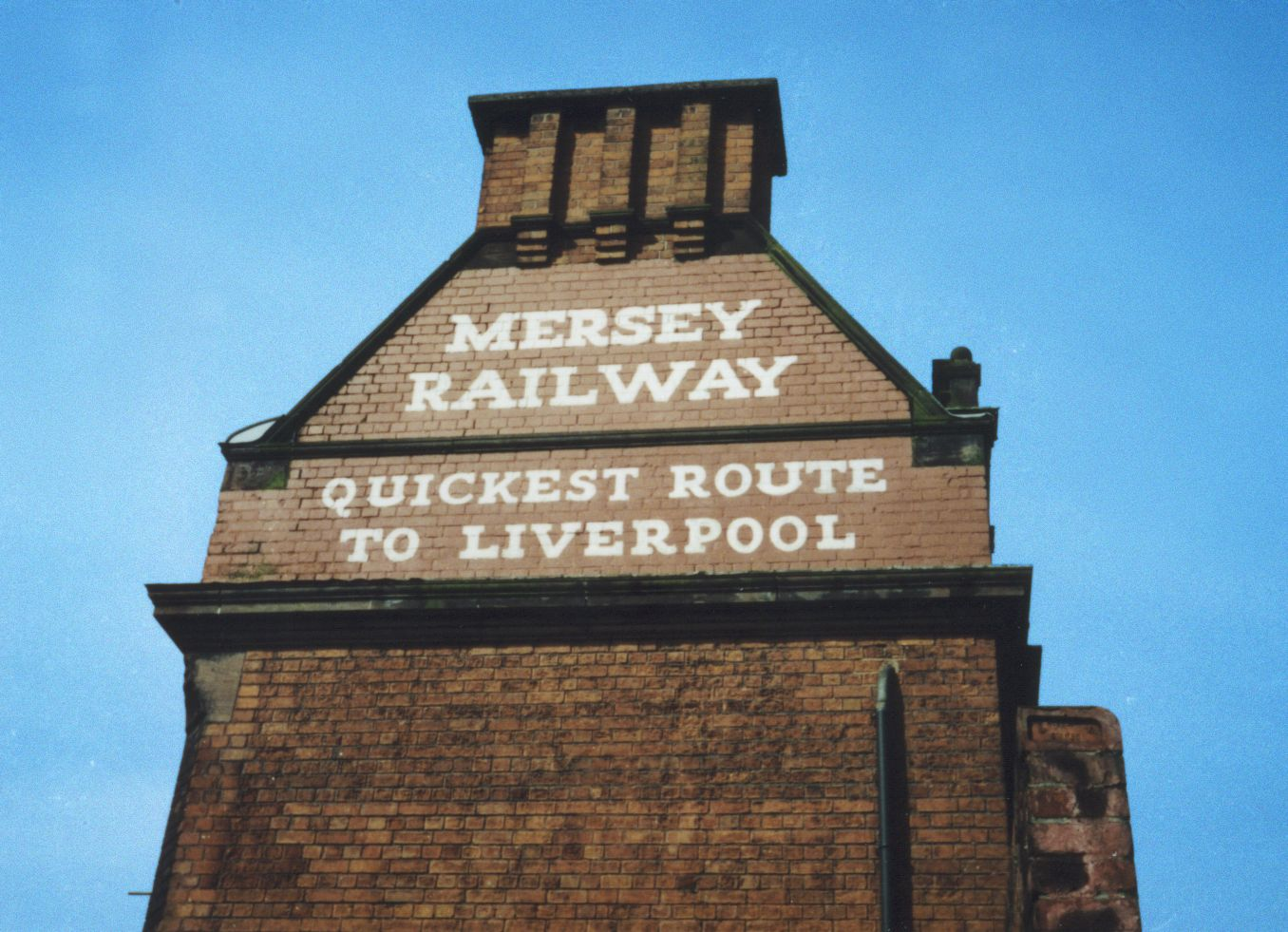
Original Mersey Railway painted signage on Birkenhead Central station where the company had its head office.

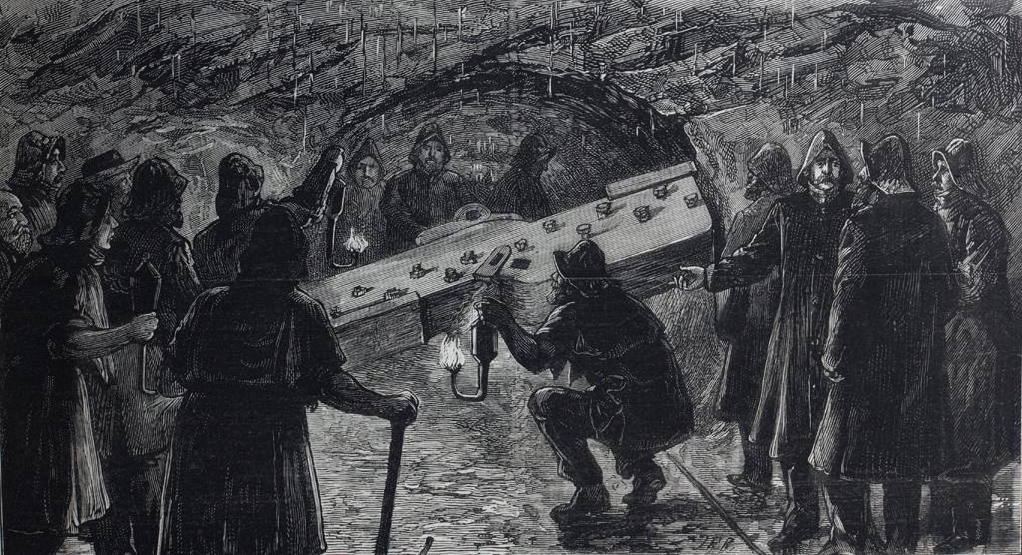
An illustration from The Graphic showing the meeting of the two railway tunnel headings beneath the River Mersey in January 1884.

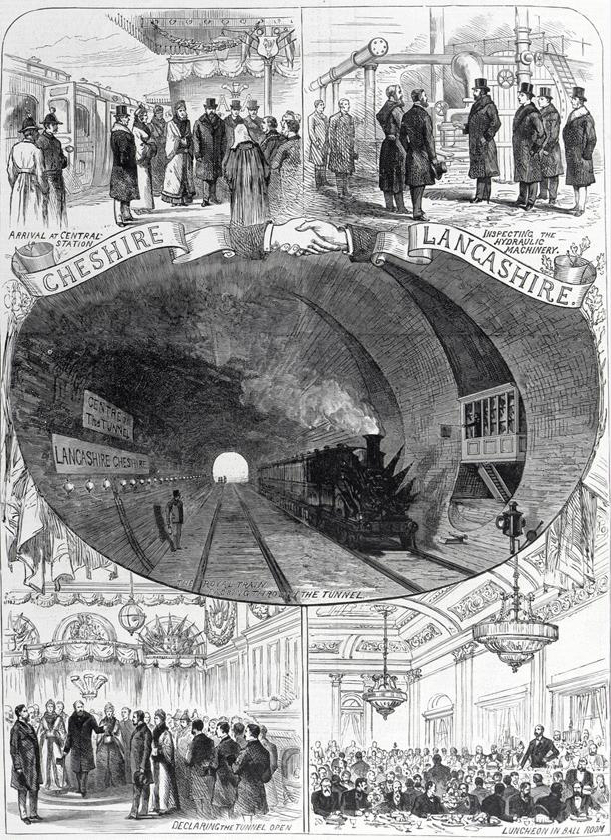
An Illustrated London News illustration of the official opening of the Mersey Railway by the Prince of Wales on 20 January 1886.

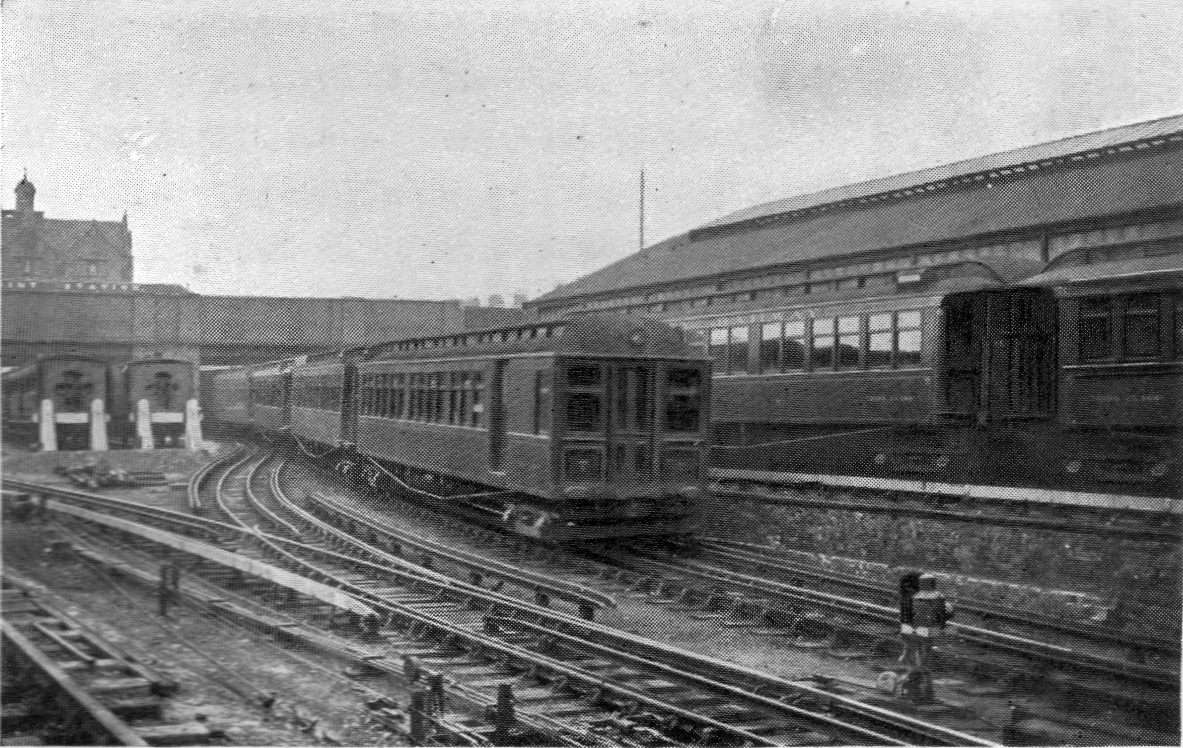
A Mersey Railway electric multiple unit (EMU) having just departed from Birkenhead Park for Liverpool.

The first proposal to connect Birkenhead and Liverpool by a rail tunnel was made in 1864 by the Liverpool and Birkenhead Railway Company. The bill received the support of the chairman of the Mersey Docks and Harbour Board and of John Laird, the Member of Parliament for Birkenhead at the time, although ultimately it was unsuccessful due to strong opposition from the LNWR. A second tunnel proposal was made in 1865 by Sir Charles Fox, who planned to build a single track pneumatic railway under the Mersey between the two settlements. The Mersey Railway Act 1866 was passed, although the project was hindered with knowledge of engineering difficulties and limitations with pneumatic railways in other parts of the country. On 22 December 1869, Fox held a meeting with Liverpool businessmen and merchants where it was decided that the pneumatic single track railway would be substituted with a conventional steam double track line. Powers for the Mersey Railway Company to build a steam railway were granted in 1871 as well as those to extend the original planned route to connect with the joint Great Western and London and North Western railway at Rock Ferry.

A contract was made with John Dickson to raise the necessary funding and then construct the railway, but he soon became bankrupt. Work on constructing the tunnel did not commence until December 1879 when a preliminary contract was entered with Major Samuel Isaac, a London businessman, to dig a pilot tunnel for determining the nature of the strata beneath the Mersey. Isaac subcontracted the construction work to John Waddell & Sons of Edinburgh who appointed James Brunlees and Charles Douglas Fox, eldest son of Sir Charles Fox, as engineers in chief. Two shafts were dug in the grounds of the Mersey Docks and Harbour Board for the pilot tunnel - one in Birkenhead with a diameter of 17 feet 6 inches (5.33 m) and the other in Liverpool of diameter 15 feet (4.6 m). It was determined that there was an almost uninterrupted stratum of red sandstone beneath the river and as a result construction began in August 1881, before the pilot bore had been completed.

A total of three tunnels were constructed – the main railway tunnel, a ventilation tunnel and a drainage tunnel. The railway tunnel was horseshoe shaped and bored to a width of 26 feet (7.9 m) and height of 19 feet (5.8 m) for two standard gauge tracks. With six layers of brickwork through sandstone and eight courses through clay, a total of around 38 million bricks were required. The drainage tunnel sloped down from the centre to pumping shafts on each side of the river each 52 metres (171 ft) deep, lined with cast iron through water-bearing strata, and with a capacity of 364 cubic metres (364,000 L) of water. Whilst water was encountered during the construction work, it was not a serious problem and the ground under the riverbanks was found to be wetter than that under the river itself. The ventilation tunnel is 7 feet 2 inches (2.18 m) in diameter and was bored 20 feet (6.1 m) parallel to the main tunnel. In 1883, the rate of work was greatly improved with the deployment of a Beaumont Cutter which was a compressed air boring machine invented by Colonel Frederick Beaumont of the Royal Engineers.

Liverpool Pumping Station was built adjacent to George's Dock and contained a pair of pumps connected to a steam engine. On the opposite bank of the river Shore Road Pumping Station was constructed in Birkenhead. The pumping plants were designed with the capacity to deal with up to four-times the amount of water that entered the drainage tunnel and subsequently the pumping shafts. Steam-driven ventilating fans were installed at James Street, Shore Road and midway between Hamilton Square and Birkenhead Central. The fans combined could draw out of the tunnel 600 cubic yards (460 m^{3}) of air per minute which meant a complete change of air in the tunnel every seven minutes.

At the start of 1884 construction work was pushed ahead with 1,400 men and 177 horses underground. On 17 January of the same year, two tunnel headings met 1,115 yards (1,020 m) from the Birkenhead shaft. A ceremony marked this occasion with Henry Cecil Raikes PC, Major Isaac, Colonel Beaumont, James Brunlees, Charles Douglas Fox, Robert Paterson (Mayor of Birkenhead) and David Radcliffe (Mayor of Liverpool) present. The tunnelling work was complete by the end of 1885 and thousands of members of the public took the opportunity to walk through the gaslit tunnel ahead of its official opening.

King Edward VII, then Prince of Wales performed the opening ceremony on 20 January 1886, accompanied by Prince Albert Victor and Prince George, later to become King George V. All three had spent the previous night at Eaton Hall and travelled on the Royal Train between Chester and Rock Ferry where the locomotive was swapped for a Mersey Railway 0-6-4 tank engine and a temporary connection to the Mersey Railway traversed ahead of the journey through the tunnel to Liverpool. At 1 pm, the Prince inaugurated the railway in James Street before attending a meal at Liverpool Town Hall. The first Mersey Railway passenger service ran ten days later on 1 February 1886. Around 36,000 passengers travelled on the railway on the first day of service and 2.5 million passengers were carried during the first six months.

Upon opening, the railway ran from James Street in Liverpool to Green Lane in Birkenhead via intermediate stations at Hamilton Square and Birkenhead Central. A branch from Hamilton Square to Birkenhead Park opened on 2 January 1888, where it connected with the Seacombe, Hoylake & Deeside Railway, later to become the Wirral Railway. Once this extension was complete, passengers were able to travel from Hoylake to Liverpool without changing trains as only the locomotives were changed for the Mersey Railway tunnelled section. On 16 June 1891, an extension was opened from Green Lane to Rock Ferry for connections with the Birkenhead Joint Railway. A further extension opened in Liverpool on 11 January 1892, from James Street to Liverpool Central increasing the total length of the railway to 8.4 kilometres (5.2 mi). This extension was tunnelled using the cut and cover method due to a ban on the use of explosives in Liverpool city centre.

Despite the four ventilation fans, passenger numbers on the railway declined due to the steam engines filling the air with smoke and soot. Coupled with the high cost of running the fans and drainage pumps, the railway found itself bankrupt by 1900. Not long afterwards, George Westinghouse, an engineer and inventor, offered to fund and carry out electrification work on the line. By the end of April 1903, and at a cost of £300,000, the electrification work was complete, making the railway Britain's first steam-operated line to be converted to electric traction. A generating station adjacent to the pumping station on Shore Road was built and installed with three Westinghouse generators which provided 650 V DC to the fourth rail system. The last steam train departed Liverpool Central on 3 May 1903 at 12.26 am and electric operation commenced that afternoon after a long morning of driver training. Passenger numbers rose again after electrification and the Mersey Railway carried over nine million passengers the following year.

To operate electric services, 24 motor and 33 trailer carriages were constructed of Baldwin-Westinghouse design. They were 60 feet (18 m) long, of an American styling, and were manufactured at the Baldwin Locomotive Works in Philadelphia, Pennsylvania. Four additional trailer vehicles of the same design were built during 1908 by G. C. Milnes Voss & Company in Birkenhead. The electric Mersey Railway trains all used a multiple unit control system developed by Westinghouse which enabled trains with motor carriages at both ends to be driven from a single cab. From 1904, driving controls were also fitted to selected trailer vehicles which enabled trains to be divided into shorter units during quieter times, yet still be drivable from both ends. Additional vehicles were added to the fleet in 1925 and 1925, constructed by Cravens of Sheffield, and in 1936, built by the Gloucester Railway Carriage and Wagon Company.

=== The Big Four ===
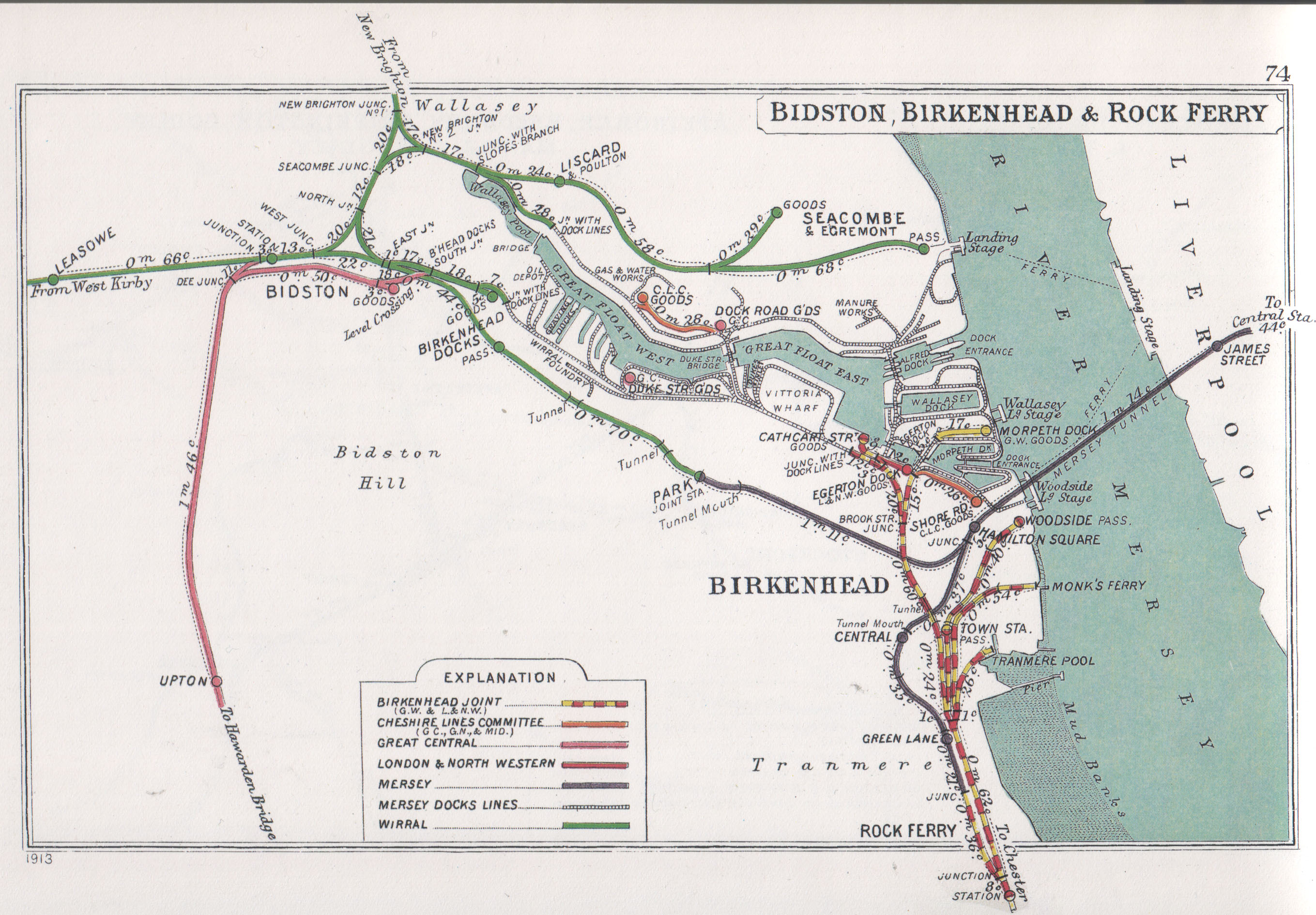
A Railway Clearing House map of the railways in Birkenhead and Bidston prior to the 1923 grouping.

The Railways Act 1921 took effect on 1 January 1923, when most railway companies in Britain were grouped into one of the Big Four. The Wirral Railway became part of the London, Midland and Scottish Railway (LMS) company, while the GCR, which it met at Bidston, was absorbed into the London and North Eastern Railway (LNER). The Birkenhead Joint Railway and the Mersey Railway were both unaffected by the grouping of 1923 and remained in existence until the nationalisation of the railways in 1948.

The Wirral Railway had considered electrification since 1900, but plans were not taken any further until 1935, when increasing traffic prompted the LMS to revive the scheme. Authorisation was granted for the West Kirby and New Brighton lines, and work was completed by February 1938. The LMS had adopted a 650 V DC third rail system which differed from the fourth-rail system of the Mersey Railway. To allow through services to run to Liverpool, all trains had to be able to operate with both systems, and automatic changeover devices were installed between each set of rails at Birkenhead Park. The LMS ordered 19 three-car units to operate their new electric services, which were later to become the Class 503 under the TOPS numbering system. The vehicles were built in Birmingham by Metropolitan Cammell and the Birmingham Railway Carriage and Wagon Company, and were maintained at Birkenhead Central TMD. Station improvement and modernisation work also accompanied the electrification work at West Kirby, Hoylake, Meols, Moreton, Leasowe and New Brighton.

With Mersey Railway trains able to use the LMS electrification system and vice versa, on 13 March 1938 the Mersey Railway was given operation of the line from Birkenhead Park to New Brighton in exchange for LMS running powers between Birkenhead Park and Liverpool Central, thus removing the need for passengers to change at Birkenhead Park for travel to Liverpool. The first direct services from West Kirby and New Brighton to Liverpool Central ran on 14 March 1938, the LMS operating the West Kirby services and the Mersey Railway running the New Brighton services. To keep LMS and Mersey Railway workers familiar with each other's routes, on Sundays the LMS worked the Rock Ferry services, and the Mersey Railway trains ran to West Kirby. The Mersey Railway also ran additional services to West Kirby on bank holidays to cater for day-trippers.

During the Second World War, the Liverpool Blitz of 1940–1941 caused severe damage to the Mersey Railway. While overground services were disrupted on several occasions, underground services always continued, despite damage to station buildings. The explosion of a parachute mine just west of Birkenhead Park station demolished the carriage shed that was located there; damaged vehicles were sent to Wolverton works and extensively rebuilt. The importance of a rail connection between Liverpool and Birkenhead during the war was such that four redundant six-car trains from the Hammersmith & City line of the former Metropolitan Railway were reconditioned by the London Passenger Transport Board and transferred to temporary LMS ownership; however, these trains never saw passenger service on the Wirral, despite being stored at Birkenhead North and Hoylake.

=== British Railways ===
Nationalisation of the railways took place on 1 January 1948, under the Transport Act 1947. All lines on the Wirral, including the Mersey Railway, were absorbed into the London Midland Region of British Railways. At first, services continued as before, with trains from New Brighton and West Kirby to Liverpool Central, and services on the former Birkenhead Joint Railway from Birkenhead Woodside to destinations such as London Paddington, Chester General, North Wales, West Kirby (via Hooton), Wolverhampton Low Level, Birmingham Snow Hill and Shrewsbury General.

In 1955, the original Mersey Railway fourth-rail system was replaced with the third rail system adopted by LMS from Birkenhead Park to New Brighton and West Kirby, removing the need for automatic changeover switches. Despite the design already being 19 years old at the time, a new batch of 28 third-rail-only Class 503 units was delivered the following year. Of these, 24 were ordered as replacements for the original Mersey Railway trains, and the remaining four to replace stock damaged during the Second World War. As each new train was placed in service, a Mersey Railway train was withdrawn and hauled by steam locomotive to Horwich Works for breaking up.

In March 1963, Dr Beeching published his first report on the future of the railways, recommending the closure of one third of the country's railway stations, including Birkenhead Woodside. His second report, in February 1965, proposed 'trunk routes' between major cities, including the West Coast route between London and Liverpool/Manchester, which was then being electrified. Once Birkenhead to Birmingham and London services were replaced with electric trains from Liverpool Lime Street, only local diesel services to Chester and Helsby remained using Birkenhead Woodside, which closed to passengers on 5 November 1967. Local services were terminated at Rock Ferry where a change to Liverpool city centre was available.

==== The development of Merseyrail ====
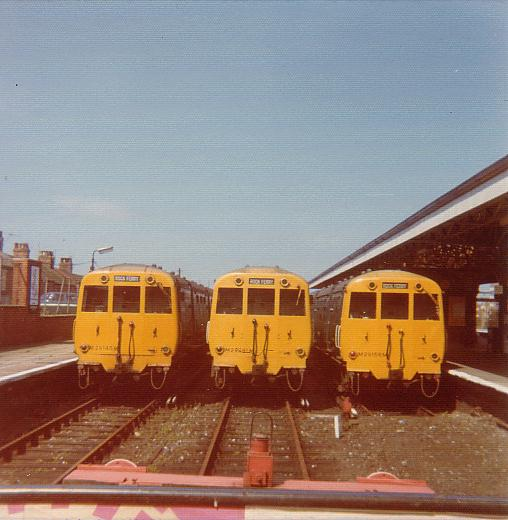
Three Class 503 units at Rock Ferry in 1973. Trains to Liverpool terminated at James Street during this period while construction of the Loop Tunnel took place.

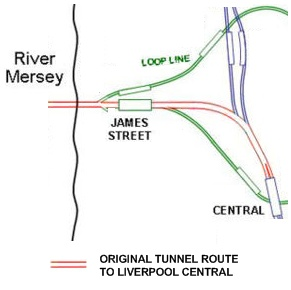
Detail of the connections between the Loop Tunnel and the original Mersey Railway tunnel at James Street.

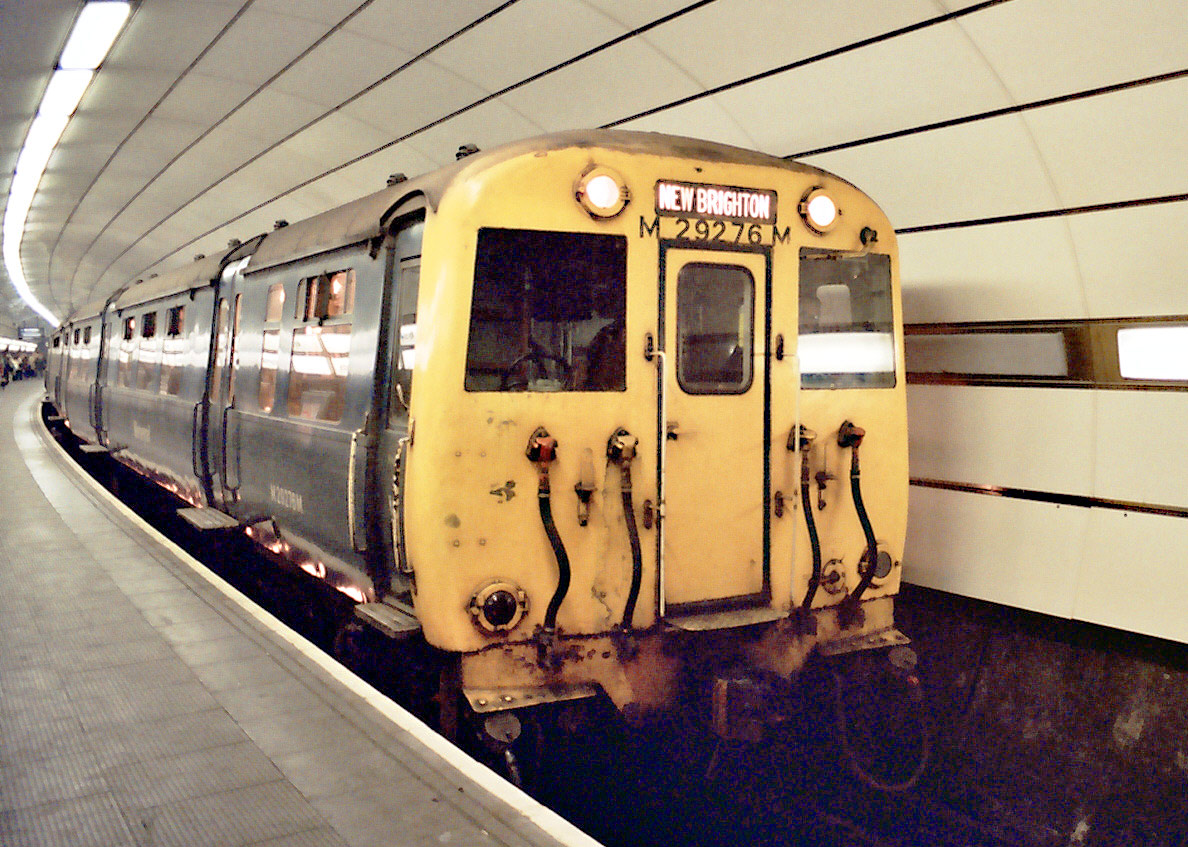
A Class 503 unit in the completed Loop Tunnel. Note the end door at the front of the train, added to the units from 1972 as a new Department of Transport requirement for rail stock used in tunnelled sections.

The programme of route closures in the early 1960s, known as the Beeching Axe, included the closure of two of Liverpool's mainline terminal stations, Liverpool Exchange and Liverpool Central high-level in Liverpool, and also Birkenhead Woodside terminal Station.

Riverside terminal station at the Pier Head was the fourth terminal station to close. This was not a part of the Beeching cuts: the demise of the trans-Atlantic liner trade forced its closure in 1971.

The Beeching Report recommended that the suburban and outer-suburban commuter rail services into both Exchange and Central High-level stations be terminated and that long and medium-distance routes be concentrated on Lime Street station. Liverpool City Council took a different view, and proposed the retention of the suburban services and their integration into a regional rapid-transit network. This approach was backed up by the Merseyside Area Land Use and Transportation Study, the MALTS report. Liverpool City Council's proposal was adopted and Merseyrail was born.

The Merseyside Passenger Transport Authority, later named Merseytravel, was formed in 1969 with representatives from all Merseyside local authorities taking responsibility for the local rail network, henceforth known as 'Merseyrail'. At that time, the lines out of Liverpool Exchange, Liverpool Central Low Level and Liverpool Lime Street stations were completely separate and were given the names of 'Northern line', 'Wirral line' and 'City line' respectively.

The new Wirral line was to have a loop tunnel under Liverpool's city centre which would be an extension of the Mersey Railway tunnel. This arrangement meant trains would only terminate in the Wirral. Trains would leave Wirral terminus stations, run into Liverpool's city centre and loop back out. Four underground stations would be on this loop under Liverpool's city centre. A further underground Link Tunnel connection between a new Moorfields through underground station and Liverpool Central underground creating a Liverpool north-south crossrail was planned. Moorfields would replace Liverpool Exchange terminus station.

The Mersey Railway Extensions Act was passed in 1968 to authorise the first stage of these improvements. The Transport Act 1968 established the Merseyside Passenger Transport Authority to control policy on public transport in the conurbation, and the Merseyside Passenger Transport Executive to manage ferry services and to make agreements with the National Bus Company and British Railways Board.

The one track Loop Tunnel was designed to allow trains to run in a clockwise direction beneath Liverpool's city centre. It diverged from the Mersey Railway tunnel beneath Mann Island extending the short Huskisson Dock branch tunnel. This short tunnel was designed to extend to Huskinson Dock for freight purposes, however the works never materialized. A new platform was built at James Street. From James Street the tunnel continued to new deep-level platforms at Moorfields, Liverpool Lime Street and Liverpool Central before rejoining the existing Mersey Railway tunnel beneath the Queen Victoria monument to allow trains to continue serving one of the existing platforms at James Street. The existing 1886 tunnel from James Street to Liverpool central was relegated to shunting purposes.

The Loop is a single-track tunnel, 2 miles (3.2 km) in length, 4.7 metres (15 ft) in diameter, and was driven during 1972 and 1973 through mainly sandstone rock. The depth of the tunnel varies between 17.6 metres (58 ft) and 37.8 metres (124 ft) lined with concrete. To bore the tunnel, three new DOSCO electro-hydraulic excavating machines were used, giving a maximum work rate of 57 metres (187 ft) per week.

In addition to the construction of the Loop Tunnel, a burrowing junction was constructed at Hamilton Square, taking the line towards Birkenhead Park beneath the Rock Ferry lines. This would allow peak-time frequencies to be increased by removing interfering train paths at the flat crossing. A new platform was built at Hamilton Square for this diversion, and the new tunnel is 620.6 metres (2,036 ft) in length.

In 1974, Merseyside was created, with Merseyside County Council taking over the responsibilities of the Merseyside Passenger Transport Authority. The Northern line, including the new Link Tunnel between Moorfields and the original Mersey Railway platforms at Liverpool Central, was opened to passengers on 2 May 1977 and the Loop Tunnel opened a week later with Wirral line trains serving Rock Ferry, New Brighton and West Kirby. The first phase of the Merseyrail development was formally opened by Queen Elizabeth II on 25 October 1978, when she visited Liverpool Central station and rode to Kirkby on the Northern line.

To operate the new Merseyrail services, procurement of new stock began for the Wirral line. Following extensive testing of PEP stock, 43 Class 508 units were ordered and constructed at BREL York during 1979–1980. Due to a stock shortage in the Southern Region, the new four-car trains were first introduced to operate inner-suburban services from London Waterloo. This allowed the few remaining 4-SUB trains to be withdrawn so that their electrical equipment could be reclaimed for the new Class 455 units. In 1981, the first two Class 508 units were sent north to Birkenhead, and three more were transferred in February 1983 as Class 455s began to enter service. The new Class 455/7 units were originally specified as having four vehicles, but they were delivered with only three vehicles as it was decided that one trailer would be removed from each Class 508 unit before being sent north to Birkenhead. The remaining Class 508 units were reduced to three carriages and delivered to Birkenhead by December 1984, allowing the Class 503 units to be withdrawn.

In the early 1980s, plans were made to extend the Wirral line from Rock Ferry to Hooton along the former Birkenhead Joint Railway route. Third rail electrification work was carried out during 1985, and Hooton to Liverpool services started on 30 September that year, at a 15-minute frequency. Bromborough Rake station opened along the line to coincide with the introduction of electric services, and diesel multiple units provided onwards connections at Hooton to Helsby and Chester. Further electrification work to Chester and Ellesmere Port was planned to start in 1990. Electric services through to Liverpool from Chester commenced on 3 September 1993 and from Ellesmere Port on 29 May 1994.

=== Post-privatisation ===
The privatisation of British Rail began in 1994 under the Railways Act 1993 and allowed separate parts of the railway to be transferred to the private sector. The Merseyrail network continued to operate as part of the Regional Railways sector of British Rail until 11 December 1996 when MTL was announced as the preferred bidder for the Merseyrail franchise. MTL ran the Merseyrail franchise as Merseyrail Electrics until 2000, when MTL was sold to Arriva by its shareholders and later rebranded as Arriva Trains Merseyside.

In 2003, Merseytravel took over responsibility for the Merseyrail franchise from the Strategic Rail Authority. In conjunction with this, on 20 July 2003, the franchise was awarded to Serco-NedRailways (now Serco-Abellio), a 50-50 joint business venture between Serco and Abellio, a subsidiary of Dutch national train operator Nederlandse Spoorwegen. Merseyrail Electrics 2002 Ltd was established by Serco-Abellio and the franchise is run under the "Merseyrail" brand with a 25-year contract ending in July 2028 and a review taking place every five years in line with the Merseyside Local Transport Plan.

== Infrastructure ==
Merseyrail network map

=== Track ===
All railway lines are built to 1,435 mm (4 ft 8 1/2 in) standard gauge. The majority of the track has a loading gauge of W6 and the line has a Route Availability (RA) of RA 8 except for the New Brighton branch which is RA 6. This makes the whole line fairly restrictive and not very attractive for freight traffic. In 2017, the track laid in the late 1970s which runs under the Mersey was replaced by Network Rail over a six-month period.

=== Electrification ===
The whole network is electrified using the 750 V DC third rail system. The Mersey Railway was electrified in 1903, making it the first railway in the world to be converted entirely to electrification. The former Wirral Railway, by then part of the London, Midland and Scottish Railway (LMS), was electrified in 1938. The opening of the Loop in 1977 led to three electrified terminals on the Wirral: New Brighton, West Kirby and Rock Ferry. Electrification south from Rock Ferry to Hooton followed in 1985, with extensions to Chester and Ellesmere Port in 1993 and 1994 respectively.

=== Rolling stock ===
In 1938, following the electrification of the former Wirral Railway, the LMS introduced new trains with air-operated sliding doors. These electric multiple units were eventually designated as Class 503. Further Class 503 units were built in 1956 to replace the former Mersey Railway carriages. The entire Class 503 stock was replaced in 1983 with Class 508 units originally built in the late 1970s for services from London Waterloo. A few years earlier (1978–1980), almost identical Class 507 units had been introduced on the Northern line to replace Class 502 stock. Following the privatisation of British Rail in 1993, Class 507 and 508 units were used interchangeably on both the Wirral and Northern lines and in 2003–2004 the 59-strong Class 507/508 fleet was refurbished by Alstom's Eastleigh Works at a cost of £32 million.

Maintenance of the Class 507 and 508 fleet was carried out at Birkenhead North TMD and Kirkdale TMD. Birkenhead North TMD, just west of Birkenhead North station, focused on major overhauls of the electric fleet, whereas Kirkdale TMD, situated south of Kirkdale station on the Northern line, was used for undertaking minor repairs and cleaning activities. Train cleaning operations took place at the now-defunct Birkenhead Central TMD beside Birkenhead Central station until the late 1990s.

It was expected by Merseyrail that the 507s and 508s would be withdrawn around 2014 and replaced by a new EMU, but this was postponed and the trains were refurbished instead. In May 2012, Merseytravel announced that it had formally begun a project for replacement of the 507s and 508s. In December 2016, Merseytravel announced that Stadler had won the £460 million contract and that the new Class 777 trains would be delivered from summer 2019, with all the old trains replaced by 2021.

In May 2014, the lease on the Class 507s and 508s was extended to 2018. As part of the agreement with Angel Trains, the fleet would receive a refresh package including external re-livery, internal enhancements and engineering work.

== Services ==
During Monday to Saturday, trains run every 15 minutes from Liverpool to each of New Brighton, West Kirby and Chester, and every 30 minutes to Ellesmere Port. During peak times outside of the leaf-fall season in autumn, additional services run to (evening peak), respectively from (morning peak) Ellesmere Port, giving a 15 minutes frequency there in the peak direction only. Hooton is the point of interchange between trains to Ellesmere Port and trains to Chester, and is served by six trains per hour from Liverpool, four of which continue to Chester (only two call at Capenhurst) and two calling at stations to Ellesmere Port. Due to the COVID-19 pandemic, these frequencies reduced as of March 2020. By mid-2022, frequencies have been increased back towards their original levels.

Interchange with the Northern line is available at Liverpool Central and Moorfields, and with the City line at Liverpool Lime Street. Transport for Wales operate services from Bidston along the Borderlands Line to Wrexham Central. Various proposals over the years have suggested the electrification of part or all of this route and incorporating it into the Wirral line, as well as also electrifying beyond Ellesmere Port through to Helsby.

Connections are available with other National Rail services at Liverpool Lime Street and Chester. There is also a connecting service from Ellesmere Port to Helsby and Warrington Bank Quay.

== Incidents ==
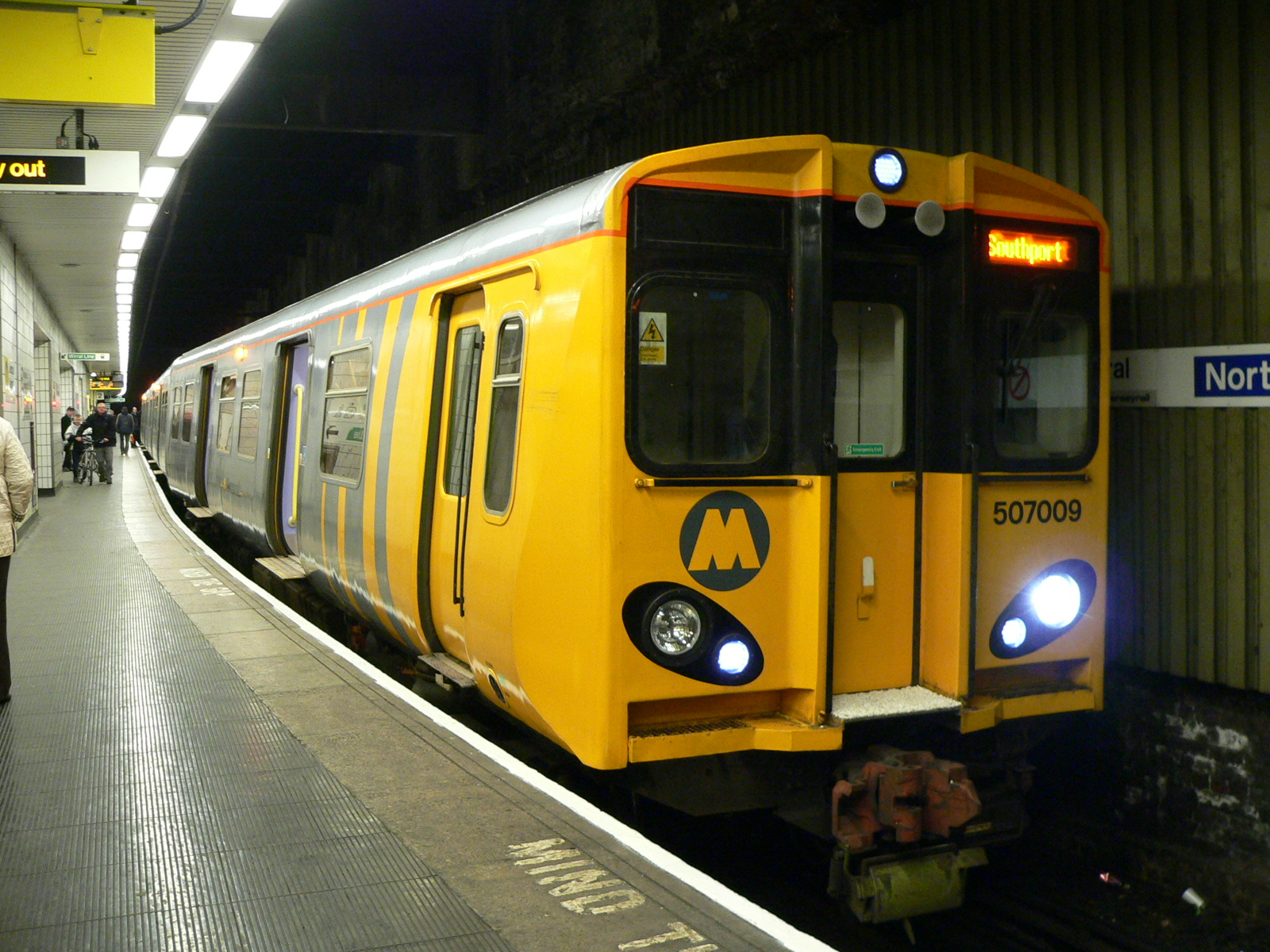
Class 507 unit 507009 which derailed as it approached Birkenhead North station on 19 May 2004.

A number of incidents have occurred on the Wirral line.

Unit 508118, while in storage in the siding at Birkenhead North, was subject to an arson attack in 2001. The unit was scrapped.

On 19 May 2004, Unit 507009 derailed at points as it approached Birkenhead North station. The leading bogie of four wheels came off the track, but the train remained upright. None of the 20 or so passengers on the train were injured. The cause was a worn switch rail and an imbalance in wheel loads across the leading carriage of the train.

At 17:41 on 26 October 2005, the rear bogie of unit 508124 derailed in the Loop tunnel between Liverpool Lime Street and Liverpool Central. Due to concerns by Network Rail as to the condition of the track, there had long been a temporary speed restriction of 20 mph (32 km/h) in the tunnel, although at the time of the derailment the train was travelling at only 12 mph (19 km/h). None of the 119 passengers were injured; the guard attended hospital overnight with a neck injury, but was not detained. In August 2006, a report by the Rail Accident Investigation Branch (RAIB) cited poor track maintenance, inadequacy of the rail fastening system, and the track infrastructure and trains not being designed as a complete system, as causes of the derailment. Liverpool-bound services terminated at James Street instead of going around the Loop while investigation and track renewal work took place.

On 19 April 2006, a small fire in the Mersey Railway Tunnel caused electrics to short circuit. The 06:30 service from Ellesmere Port to Liverpool Central was in the tunnel at the time of the incident. All 120 passengers were escorted 400 yards (370 m) through the tunnel to Hamilton Square.

At 11:57 on 11 January 2007, unit 507019 hit the buffers at West Kirby as it was arriving from Liverpool Central. There were no injuries to the 20–30 passengers, but the driver and guard were treated for shock and minor rib injuries respectively. The train was travelling at around 5 mph (8.0 km/h) at the time of impact when it demolished the buffers and caused other minor damage. The unit was towed to Crewe Works and repaired.

On 30 October 2007, a fire broke out on a Liverpool Central to Chester service. The train was evacuated at Bromborough Rake. The fire was caused by an electrical fault, and the carriage involved was damaged.

The West Kirby branch of the line has several level crossings, and accidents at these, involving pedestrian fatalities, have taken place in July 2007, January 2008, and November 2009.

== See also ==
- Commuter rail in the United Kingdom

== Bibliography ==
- Baughan, Peter E. (1980). Regional history of the railways of Great Britain: North and Mid Wales. Vol. 11 (illustrated ed.). Newton Abbot: David and Charles. ISBN 9780715378502.
- Beeching, Richard (February 1965). The development of the major railway trunk routes. London: British Railways Board.
- Beeching, Richard (27 March 1963). The Reshaping of British Railways - Part 1: Report. London: Her Majesty's Stationery Office.
- Bradshaw's Railway Manual, Shareholders' Guide and Directory for 1889. London: W.J. Adams. 1889. OCLC 173728390.
- Casserley, Henry (1968). Britain's Joint Lines. London: Ian Allan. ISBN 9780711000247.
- Duffy, Michael Ciaran (2003). Electric railways 1880 - 1990. London: The Institution of Electrical Engineers. ISBN 9780852968055.
- Gahan, John W. (1983). The Line Beneath The Liners: A hundred years of Mersey Railway sights and sounds. Birkenhead: Countyvise. ISBN 9780907768401.
- Holt, Geoffrey Ogden (27 July 1978). A regional history of the railways of Great Britain: The North West. Vol. 10. Newton Abbot: David & Charles. ISBN 9780715375211.
- Locomotive Railway Carriage & Wagon Review. Vol. 31. Locomotive Pub. Co. 1925.
- The Railway News and Joint-Stock Journal. London: The Office of the "Railway News". December 1864. OCLC 145379756.
- Rickards, George (1863). The Statutes of the United Kingdom of Great Britain and Ireland [1807-1865]. His Majesty's statute and law printers. OCLC 4814919.
- Simmons, Jack; Biddle, Gordon (1997). The Oxford Companion to British Railway History From 1603 to the 1990s. Oxford University Press. ISBN 9780192116970.
- The Story of Merseyrail. Merseyside Passenger Transport Executive and British Rail. December 1978. OCLC 8740619.
- van de Velde, Didier (1999). Changing Trains: Railway Reform and the Role of Competition - The Experience of Six Countries. Aldershot: Ashgate. ISBN 9781840148787.
- Whishaw, Francis (1838). Analysis of railways: consisting of a series of reports on the railways projected in England and Wales, in the year M.DCCC.XXXVII (2nd ed.). London: John Weale. OCLC 642411114.
