= Moreton railway station (Merseyside) =

Railway station serving Moreton, Merseyside, England

Coordinates: 53.408°N 3.113°W

Moreton
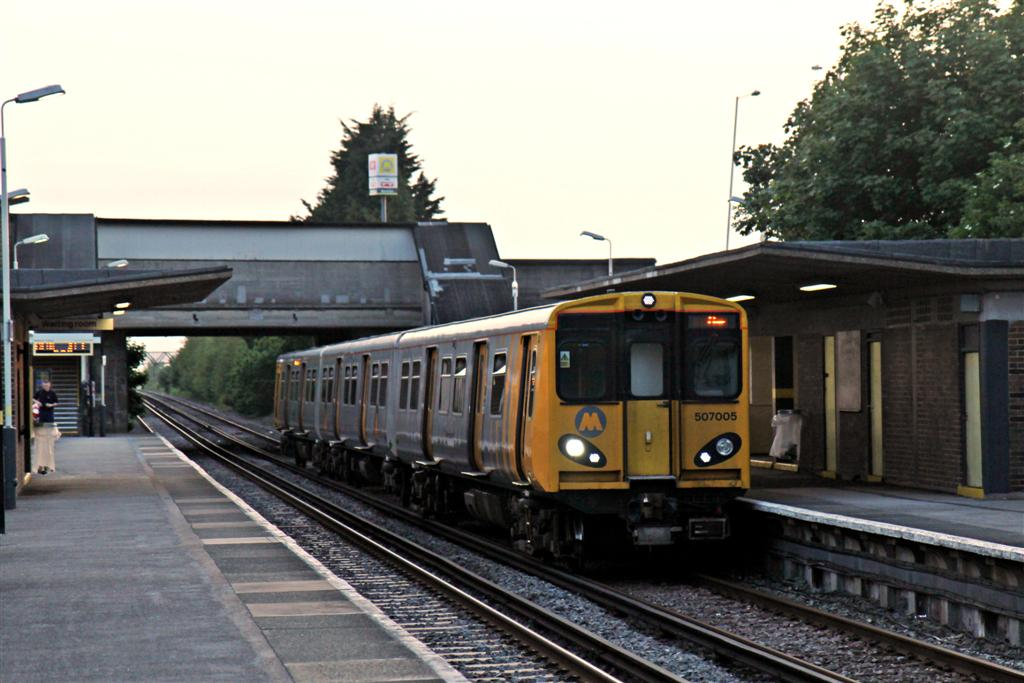
- A Merseyrail Class 507 at Moreton

General information
- Location: Moreton, Wirral; England
- Grid reference: SJ260906
- Manager: Merseyrail
- Transit authority: Merseytravel
- Platforms: 2

Other information
- Station code: MRT
- Fare zone: B1
- Classification: DfT category E

Key dates
- 1866: Opened
- 1938: Electrified

Passengers
- 2021/22: ▲0.406 million
- 2022/23: ▲0.469 million
- 2023/24: ▲0.505 million
- 2024/25: ▲0.553 million
- 2025/26: ▲0.592 million
Location
Notes
- Passenger statistics from the Office of Rail and Road

Moreton railway station serves the town of Moreton, in Merseyside, England. The station is on the West Kirby branch of the Wirral Line, which is part of the Merseyrail network.

== History ==
Moreton station opened for regular service on 2 July 1866, on the Hoylake Railway, between Hoylake and Birkenhead Docks. By 1898, the station had a small signal box towards the eastern end of the westbound platform, and a siding to the south of the station. West of the station, sidings for Moreton brickworks were added around 1903. The signal box was replaced in 1932, and moved to the north side of the tracks beyond the eastern end of the platform.

The platform buildings were replaced in 1938, rebuilt in an identical style to one at Hoylake. Through electric services to Liverpool Central commenced on 13 March 1938, when the LMS electrified the lines from Birkenhead Park to West Kirby. The service was provided by the then-new LMS electric multiple units. However, on Sunday mornings, the service was provided by the older Mersey Railway electric units which, up until that point, had only ever run from Liverpool to Birkenhead Park.

Cadbury had a private siding adjacent to the station after 1956, although their freight trains had ended by 1971. The 30-lever signal box closed on 17 September 1994, and was demolished on 13 November 1994.

== Facilities ==
The station has a booking office and a 34-space car park, a cycle rack for 4 cycles and secure storage for 20 cycles. The station is staffed, 15 minutes before the first train and 15 minutes after the last train, has departure and arrival screens for passenger information, and platform CCTV. Each platform has open-air seating, a waiting room and a payphone.

== Services ==
Current services are every 15 minutes (Monday to Saturday daytime) to West Kirby and Liverpool. At other times, trains operate every 30 minutes. These services are provided by Merseyrail's fleet of Class 777 EMUs.

== Gallery ==
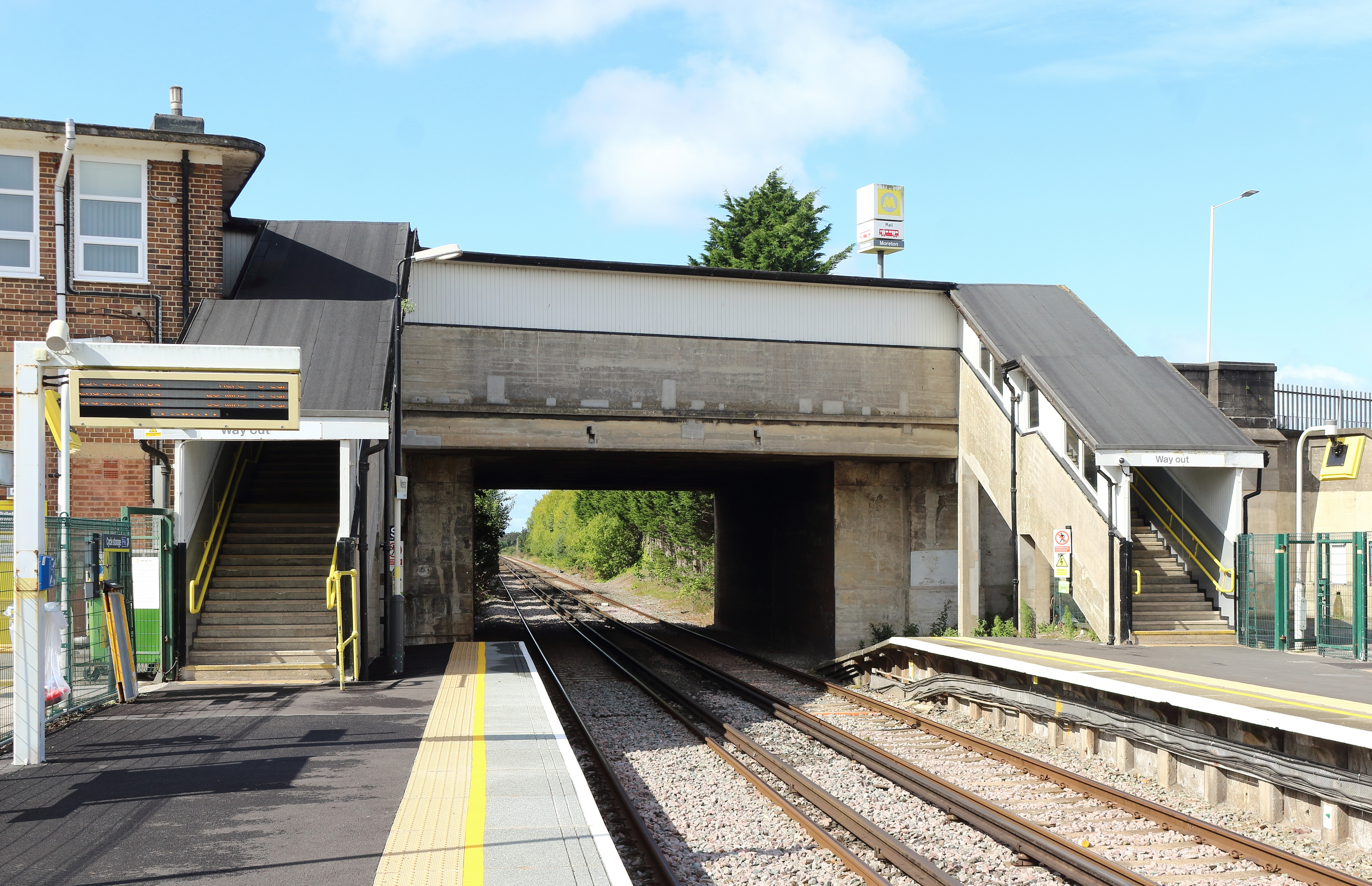
The station overbridge.

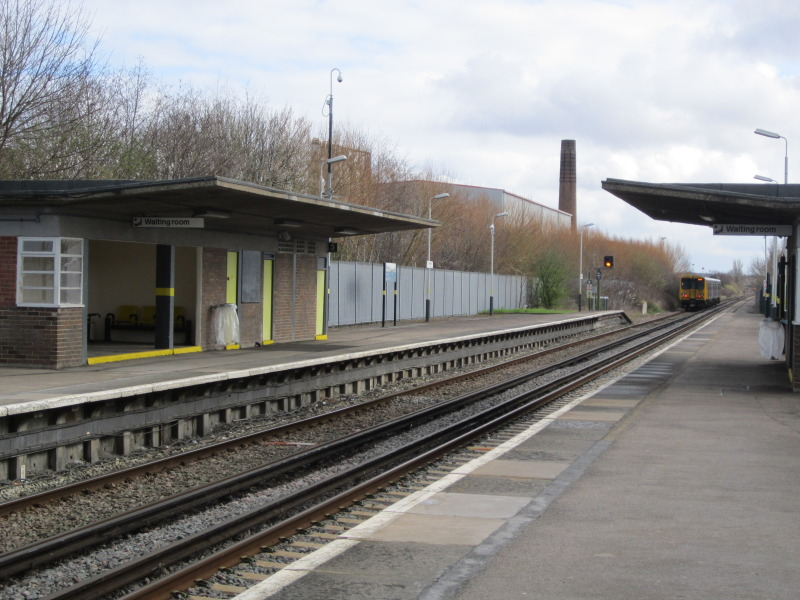
The station platforms and waiting shelters.

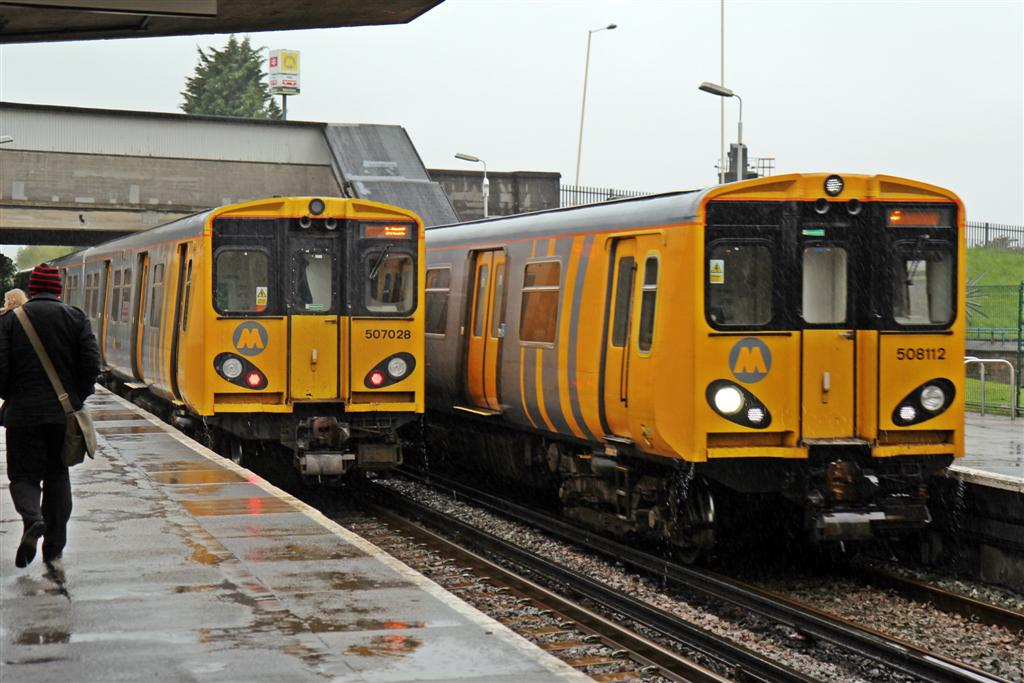
Merseyrail Class 507 and Class 508 units pass at the station.

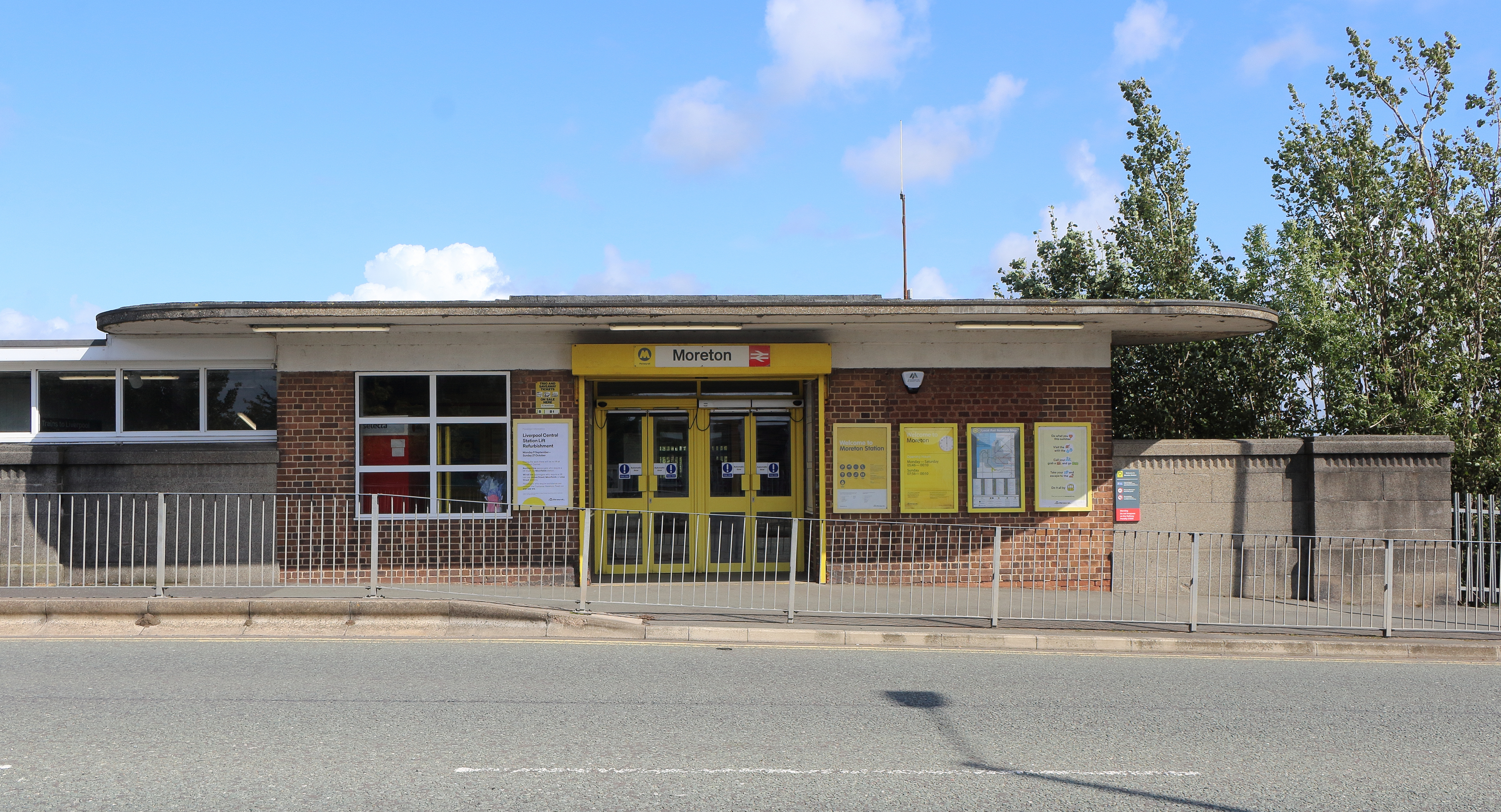
Station building, viewed from the main road.

| Preceding station | National Rail | Following station |
|---|---|---|
| Meols towards West Kirby | Merseyrail; Wirral Line; West Kirby Branch | Leasowe towards Liverpool Central |
