= Birkenhead Central TMD =

Former rail depot in Birkenhead, England

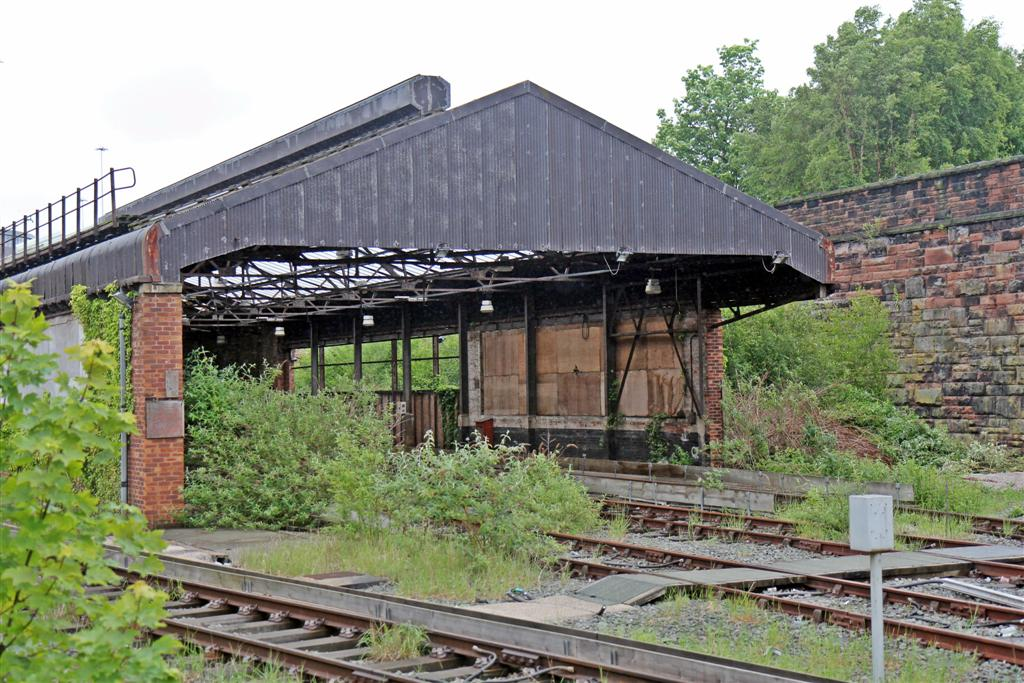
- The former carriage shed, 2012.
- Interactive map of Birkenhead Central TMD

Location
- Location: Birkenhead, Wirral
- Coordinates: 53.3881°N 3.0205°W
- OS grid: SJ321884

Characteristics
- Owner: Network Rail
- Operator: Merseyrail (1976-1997)
- Depot code: BK
- Type: EMU

History
- Closed: 1997
- Original: Mersey Railway
- Pre-grouping: Mersey Railway
- Post-grouping: British Railways
- Former rolling stock: Class 503 (1938–85); Class 508 (1979–2023); Class 507 (1978–2024)

Birkenhead Central TMD is a former traction maintenance depot located adjacent to Birkenhead Central railway station, in Birkenhead, England. The depot was located nearby to the former depot at Mollington Street. The Birkenhead Central depot was closed in 1997, although the depot housing still exists along with all the track.

A single siding, nearest to the Ellesmere Port and Chester-bound platform of Birkenhead Central station, is frequently used for the storage of Merseyrail Classes 507 and 508 units.

== History ==
The depot was used for the storage and maintenance of Class 503 units, as well as the earlier Mersey Railway electric units.

== Future ==
The October 2017 Liverpool City Region Combined Authority update to the Long Term Rail Strategy mentions the opening of a new facility at Birkenhead to increase the depot capacity of the Merseyrail network.
