= British Rail Class 503 =

Class of British electric multiple unit

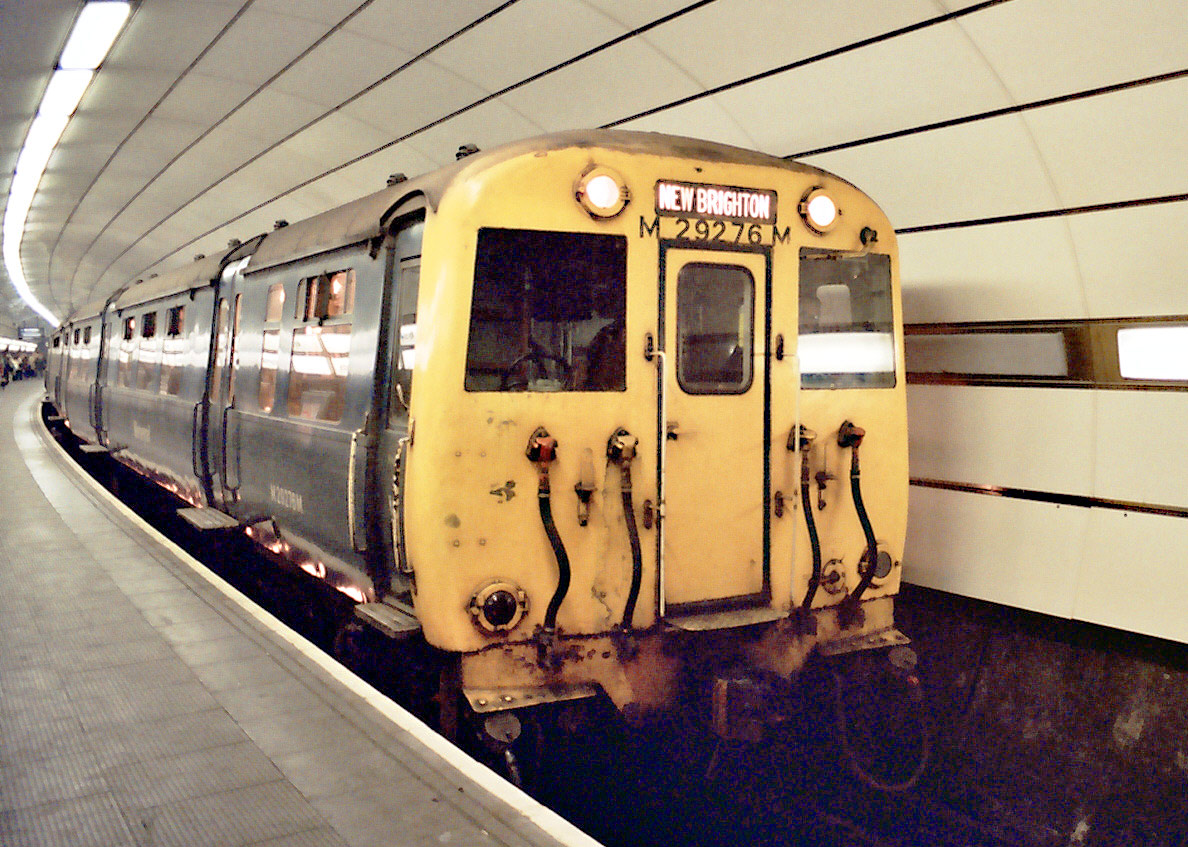
- A British Rail Class 503 train in the Liverpool Loop tunnel. This train was one of the original batch built by the LMS in 1938.

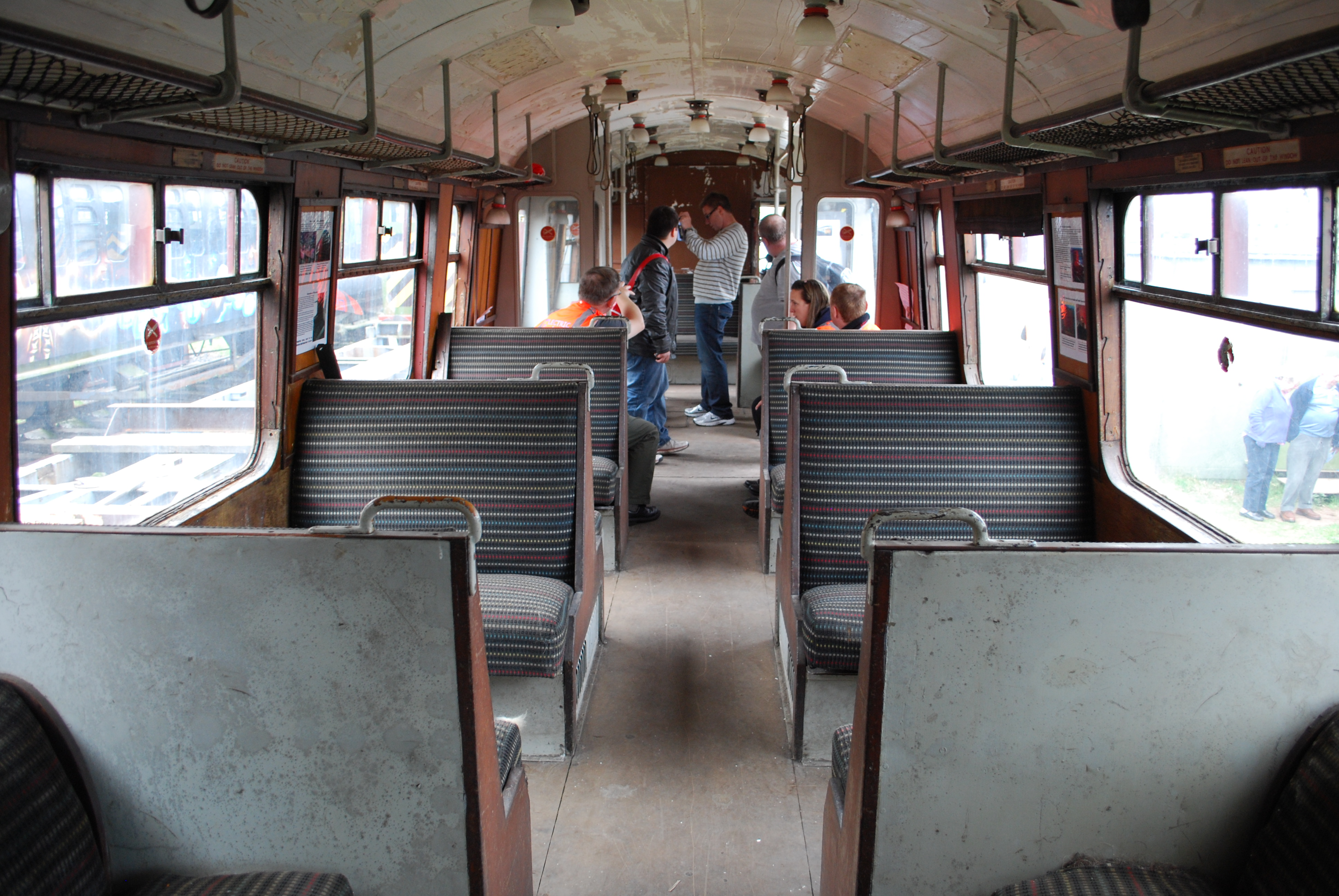
- The interior of DMBS car 28690 at the Electric Railway Museum, Coventry.
- In service: 1938–1985
- Manufacturers: Metro Cammell, Birmingham RC&W
- Replaced: Mersey Railway electric units
- Constructed: 1938 and 1956
- Refurbished: 1971 (First class accommodation removed); 1972 (End doors fitted)
- Scrapped: 1985
- Number built: 19 full sets (1938); 24 full sets (1956); 2 TS+DTS (1956)
- Number preserved: 1
- Number scrapped: 44
- Formation: 3 cars per trainset: DMBS+TS+DTS
- Diagram: BR EB203 or LMS 344A (DMBS); BR EH214 or LMS 368A (TS); BR EE202 or LMS 392A (DTS)
- Fleet numbers: 28672-28690 (DMBS 1938); 28371-28394 (DMBS 1956); 29702-29720 (TS 1938); 29821-29846 (TS 1956); 29271-29289 (DTS 1938); 29131-29156 (DTS 1956)
- Capacity: 40 (First class); 141 (Third Class)
- Operators: LMS; British Railways
- Depots: Birkenhead Central; Birkenhead North
- Lines served: Wirral Line (1938–1985); Northern Line (1977–1981)

Specifications
- Train length: 176 ft 11 in (53.92 m)
- Car length: 58 ft 0 in (17.68 m) (DMBS and DTS); 56 ft 0 in (17.07 m) (TS)
- Width: 9 ft 11 in (3.02 m) (less over body, greatest width over footsteps)
- Height: 11 ft 5 in (3.48 m)
- Doors: 4 × Twin 3 ft 9 in (1.14 m) electro-pneumatic sliding doors per car
- Wheelbase: 41 ft 0 in (12.50 m) (Centres of bogies); 7 ft 6 in (2,290 mm) (Bogie)
- Maximum speed: 65 mph (105 km/h)
- Weight: Total: 77 t (76 long tons; 85 short tons); 37 t (36 long tons; 41 short tons) (DMBS); 20 t (20 long tons; 22 short tons) (TS); 22 t (22 long tons; 24 short tons) (DTS, 29131-29156); 21 t (21 long tons; 23 short tons) (DTS, 29271-29289)
- Traction system: BTH
- Traction motors: 4 × EE
- Power output: 135 hp (101 kW) per traction motor; Total: 540 hp (400 kW)
- Tractive effort: 4 × 93 hp (69 kW) continuous; Total: 372 hp (277 kW) continuous
- HVAC: Electric heating, self-ventilated
- Electric system: 650 V DC third rail or fourth rail
- Current collection: Contact shoe
- UIC classification: Bo′Bo′+2′2′+2′2′
- Bogies: Single bolster
- Braking systems: Westinghouse electro-pneumatic and straight air brakes
- Coupling system: Buckeye (between sets); Screw (individual cars)
- Multiple working: Within class only
- Track gauge: 1,435 mm (4 ft 8 1/2 in) standard gauge

Notes/references
- End doors fitted for tunnel working from 1972.

British Rail Class 503 passenger trains were 65 mph (105 km/h) electric multiple units. They were introduced in two batches: the first were in 1938, by the London, Midland and Scottish Railway (LMS), with a further batch (built to a similar design) in 1956 by the then nationalised British Railways (BR). When introduced by the LMS, they were known officially as Class AM3. They were designed for, and operated on, the Wirral & Mersey lines from Liverpool to West Kirby, New Brighton and Rock Ferry. There were few places on their network of closely-spaced stations to attain their maximum speed, except for the open section between Moreton and Meols. All but one set were withdrawn and scrapped by 1985. The final set was used on special Merseyrail services until 1988; it was preserved and kept at the Electric Railway Museum near Coventry, until it moved on to the Locomotive Storage Ltd warehouse at Margate.

== Overview ==
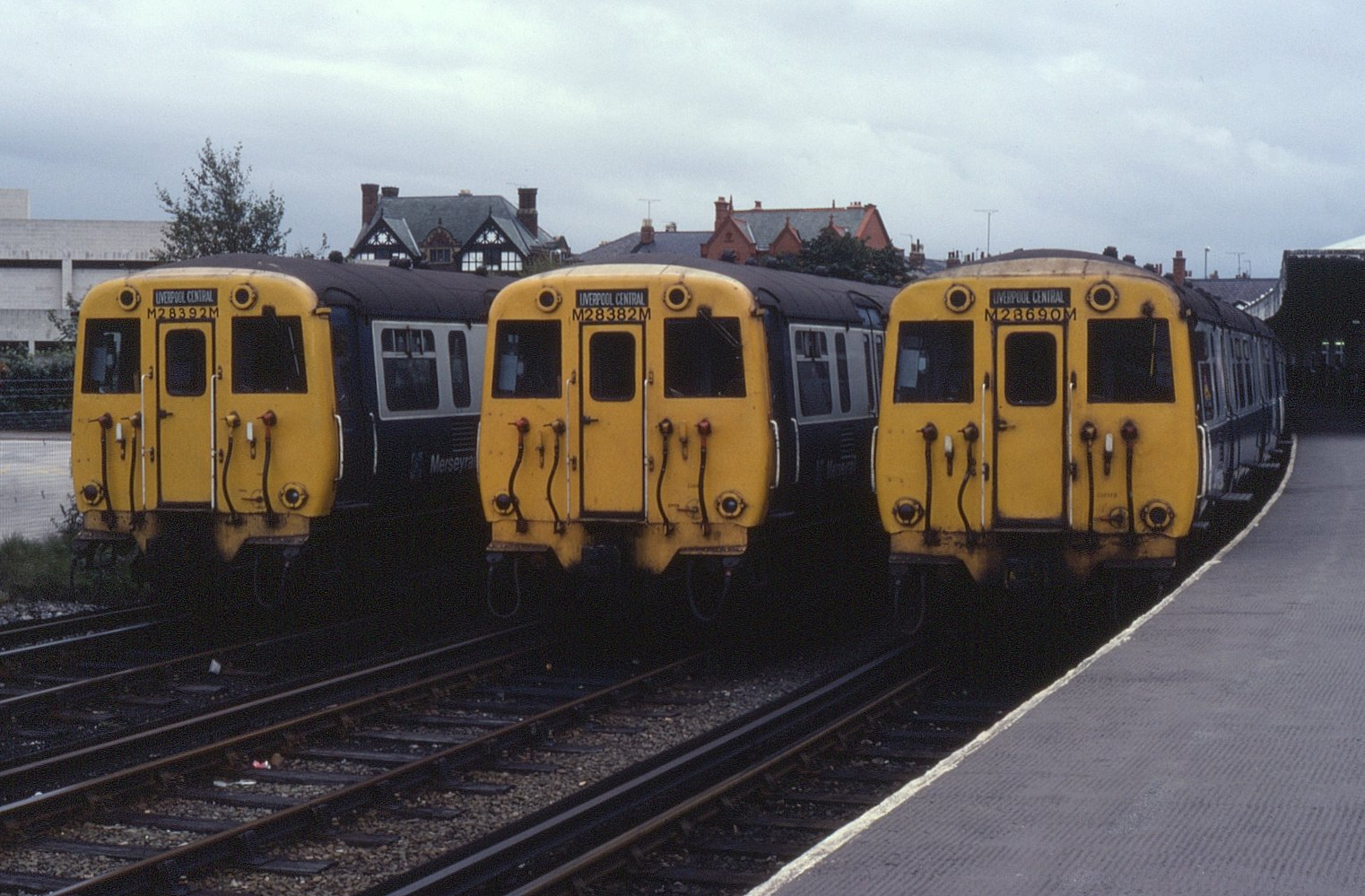
A 1938 unit stands at the platform, next to two later 1956 units in the sidings, at West Kirby, in 1982.

When introduced by the LMS, the class was officially known as Class AM3. (Note: This LMS classification scheme should not be confused with the Class 303 EMUs, which were also known as AM3 under the BR scheme, prior to the introduction of TOPS.) The two batches were almost identical, a difference being that the 1938 stock had passenger door-open buttons mounted on the doorleaf itself, whereas on the 1956 the buttons were on the bodyside next to the door. Motor units could be identified from the driving trailers by the ventilation louvres in the bodyside near the car ends which led to ducting down to the motors. Originally, these trains featured a flat front. Emergency end doors were added, in 1972, as part of a Department of Transport directive for when working in a tunnel.

The trains were fitted with four position marker lights on the front, which were used throughout their life as indicators to signalmen - both top lights for Rock Ferry, both right-hand lights for West Kirby, and one top light for New Brighton.

When first introduced they were seen to be of a very advanced design for a mainline railway's suburban passenger trains, featuring things such as air-operated sliding doors which were opened and closed by the guard (hitherto trains either had "slam doors" or hand-operated sliding doors). Class 503 were the first group of electric trains on the main British railway system with air-operated power doors, located at the quarter points of each coach under the control of the guard, which became a later general standard.

== Builders ==
They were not built in the LMS's own workshops, but by contractors in Birmingham: Metro Cammell of Saltley (who built the motor coaches), and Birmingham RC&W of Smethwick (who built the underframes). Both companies had previous experience of building this type of train for the London Underground. Significant points of similarity can be seen between the Class 503 and the London Underground O and P Stock, produced shortly beforehand by Birmingham RC&W. The traction motors were supplied by British Thomson-Houston.

== Operation ==
Between 1936 and 1938, the Wirral lines were modified and electrified using a 650 V DC third rail system. The new stock was used on the West Kirby line on weekdays, and the New Brighton and Rock Ferry lines on Sundays. including inter-running onto the Mersey Railway through to Liverpool, while the older Mersey Railway electric units were now used on the New Brighton route, during the week.

After the 1956 stock was built, it was normal for the West Kirby route to be operated by the newer stock, and the New Brighton/Rock Ferry routes to be operated mostly by 1938 stock. When the Liverpool loop lines were opened, the stock became fully mixed on all routes.

The units spent most of their working lives on the commuter routes between Liverpool and the Wirral; routes which latterly became known as the Wirral Line of Merseyrail. In 1977, three six-car trains were transferred to the Northern Line. They mainly worked the Kirkby to Garston service until 30 October 1981, and were then returned to the Wirral Line.

== Wartime destruction and replacements ==
On the night of 12–13 March 1941 four of the 1938 cars, two trailers and two driving trailers, were destroyed by wartime bombing while standing at Birkenhead North in the same air raid which severely damaged Birkenhead Park station, and destroyed much else of Birkenhead and Wallasey. The two associated motor cars remained spare until the 1956 batch was built, when four replacement cars were added to the production. This accounts for the unbalanced number of cars produced in 1956. A known feature of the Ian Allan ABC rolling stock books for many years was that the destroyed cars continued to be listed, incorrectly, until well into the 1960s and after the replacements had been built.

== Interiors ==
Loading gauge restrictions meant the class did not have the width, or length, which was possible with the Class 502 Liverpool to Southport sets introduced shortly afterwards, to a somewhat similar design. Seats in second class were 2+2, and in first class 2+1, with all seats aligned properly with the windows. The Class 508 units were introduced as their successors in 1985, and did not come with first class.

== Maintenance ==
The main maintenance depot was at Birkenhead North, dedicated to the units. Careful attention allowed them to remain in good condition right up to their final withdrawal in 1985, unlike some other units elsewhere in the country at this time. Every four years, major overhauls, including full repaints, were conducted at Horwich Works, near Bolton. Along with other North-West EMUs, a set would be formed up at Birkenhead North with a match wagon and hauled by locomotive to Horwich. Until 1962, sets were hauled to Horwich via the West Kirby to Hooton Line and, later on, the route was via the Mid-Wirral Line.

== Formation ==
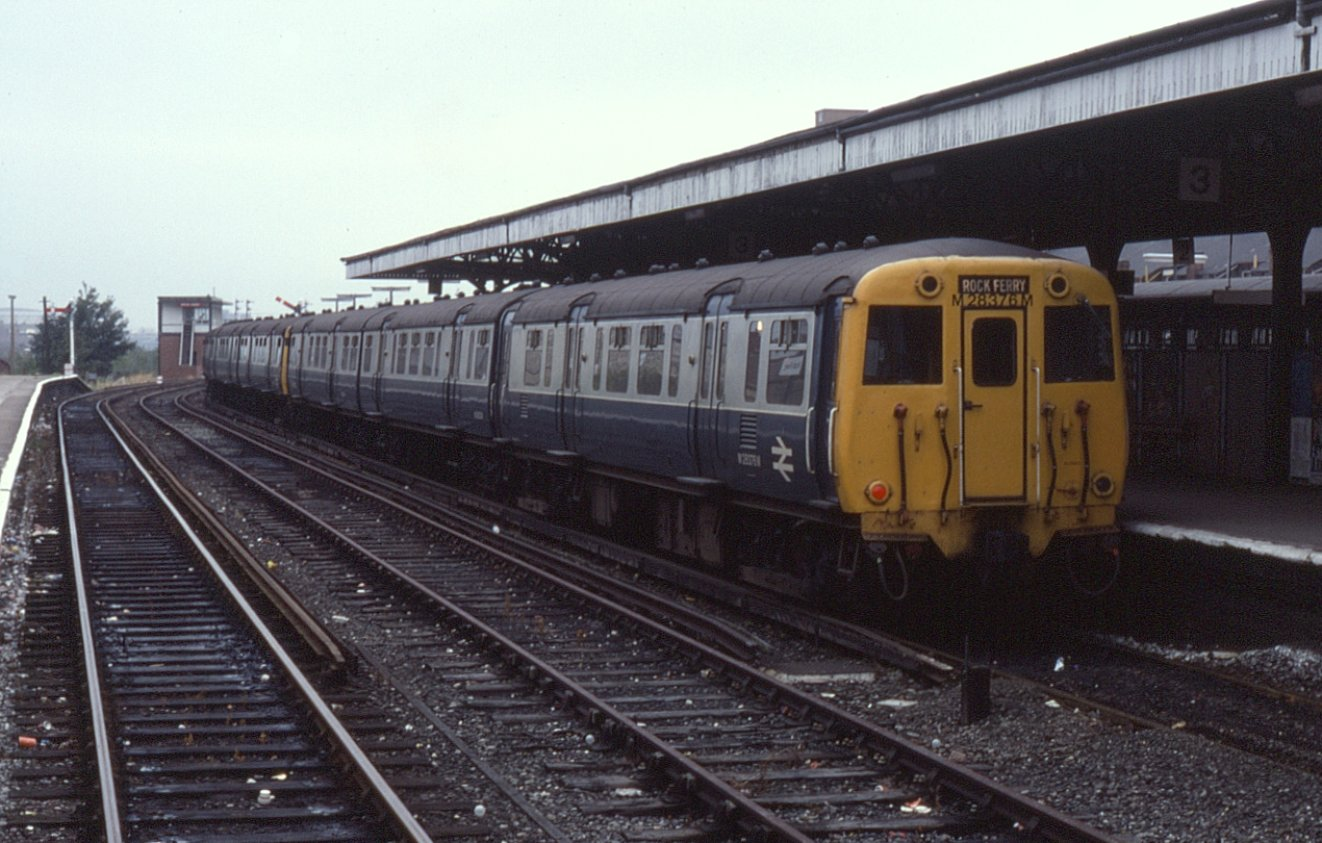
A six-car set at Rock Ferry, in 1983.

It was normal for the trains to operate as 6-car sets at peak times, reduced to 3-car sets off-peak. As all routes doubled their frequency at peak times as well, much of the stock spent a considerable amount of time out of service. There was no major stabling point on the system, various sidings dispersed around the network being used. For much of the trains' life, effort was put into deciding whether to leave the off-peak formations as 6-car on any day. For instance, during Christmas shopping weeks, or fine Summer Sundays, when the network used to handle much additional traffic from Liverpool and Birkenhead, to the seaside town termini of New Brighton and West Kirby.

== Numbering ==
British Railways numbers were:

- Driving Motor Brake Second (DMBS)
  - M28672M-M28690M (19 cars 1938, Metro Cammell).
  - M28371M-M28394M (24 cars 1956, Metro Cammell).
- Trailer Second (TS) (Trailer Composite (TC) prior to mid-1970s)
  - M29702M-M29720M (19 cars 1938, 29702-12 by Metro Cammell, 29713-20 by BRCW). 29708/17 destroyed 1941.
  - M29821M-M29846M (26 cars 1956, 29821-30 by BRCW, 29833-46 by Metro Cammell). 29831-2 by BRCW as war replacements.
- Driving Trailer Second (DTS)
  - M29271M-M29289M (19 cars 1938, BRCW). 29277/86 destroyed 1941.
  - M29131M-M29156M (26 cars 1956, 29131-54 by BRCW). 29155-6 by BRCW as war replacements.

== Livery ==
The units were introduced with an all-over maroon livery by the LMS. From 1949 to 1956, the livery which BR applied was malachite green. Following this, BR green, with a yellow warning panel on the cab ends, was applied. By the early 1970s, the livery was all-over Rail Blue, with the cab ends repainted as full yellow. From the late 1970s, the livery became BR blue and grey, which the units carried until withdrawal. The preserved set was repainted in LMS all-over maroon, in 1985.

== Withdrawal and preservation ==
=== Withdrawal ===
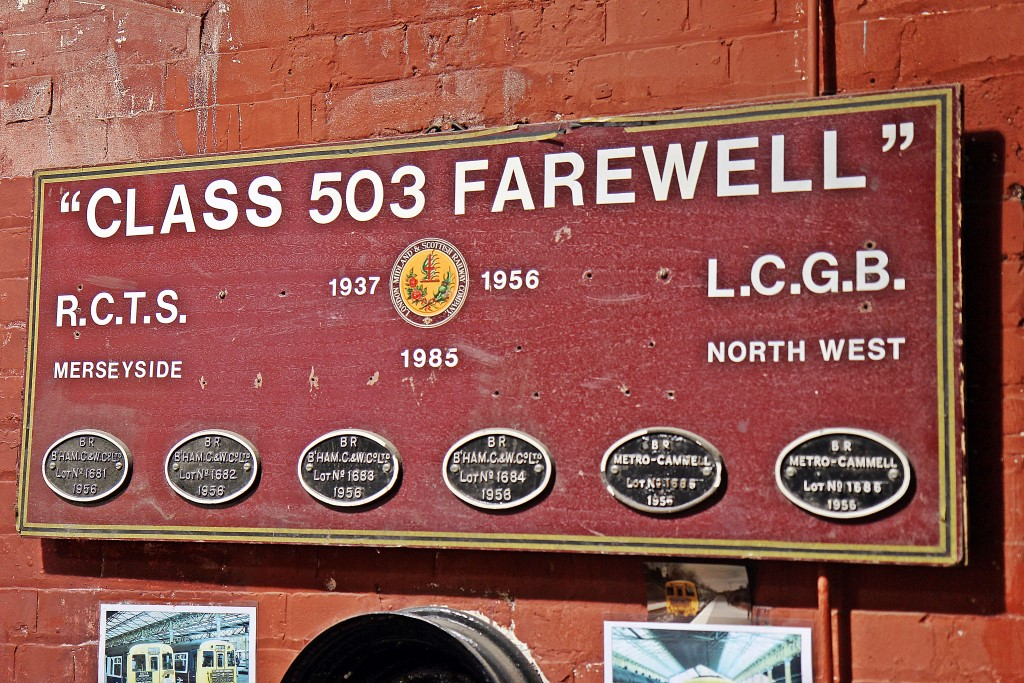
A preserved signboard from the Class 503 farewell tour, at the Wirral Transport Museum, Birkenhead. Although the six BR manufacturer's plates remain on the board, the six LMS plates have been removed.

The class was replaced by Classes 507 and 508. Although some had been withdrawn from June 1980 onwards, the majority of the Class 503s were progressively withdrawn from June 1984, the final service train running on 29 March 1985. This was followed by a farewell tour on 13 April 1985. Cars 28672, 29271 and 29702 had been used as a sandite unit on the Northern Line, after initial withdrawal in 1981. The departmental number of 977115 was allocated to car 29702 but never carried. This set was again withdrawn on 6 December 1984. DMBS car 28686 was gutted during a fire brigade exercise on 19 June 1983, before being left at Cavendish sidings. Some units were scrapped at Cavendish sidings on the Birkenhead Dock Branch line, whilst others were scrapped at the nearby Mollington Street depot. The remainder were scrapped at Alexandra Dock, BREL Horwich and also in Northwich, mainly under contract to Vic Berry, TW Ward and HP Cartwright.

=== Preservation ===
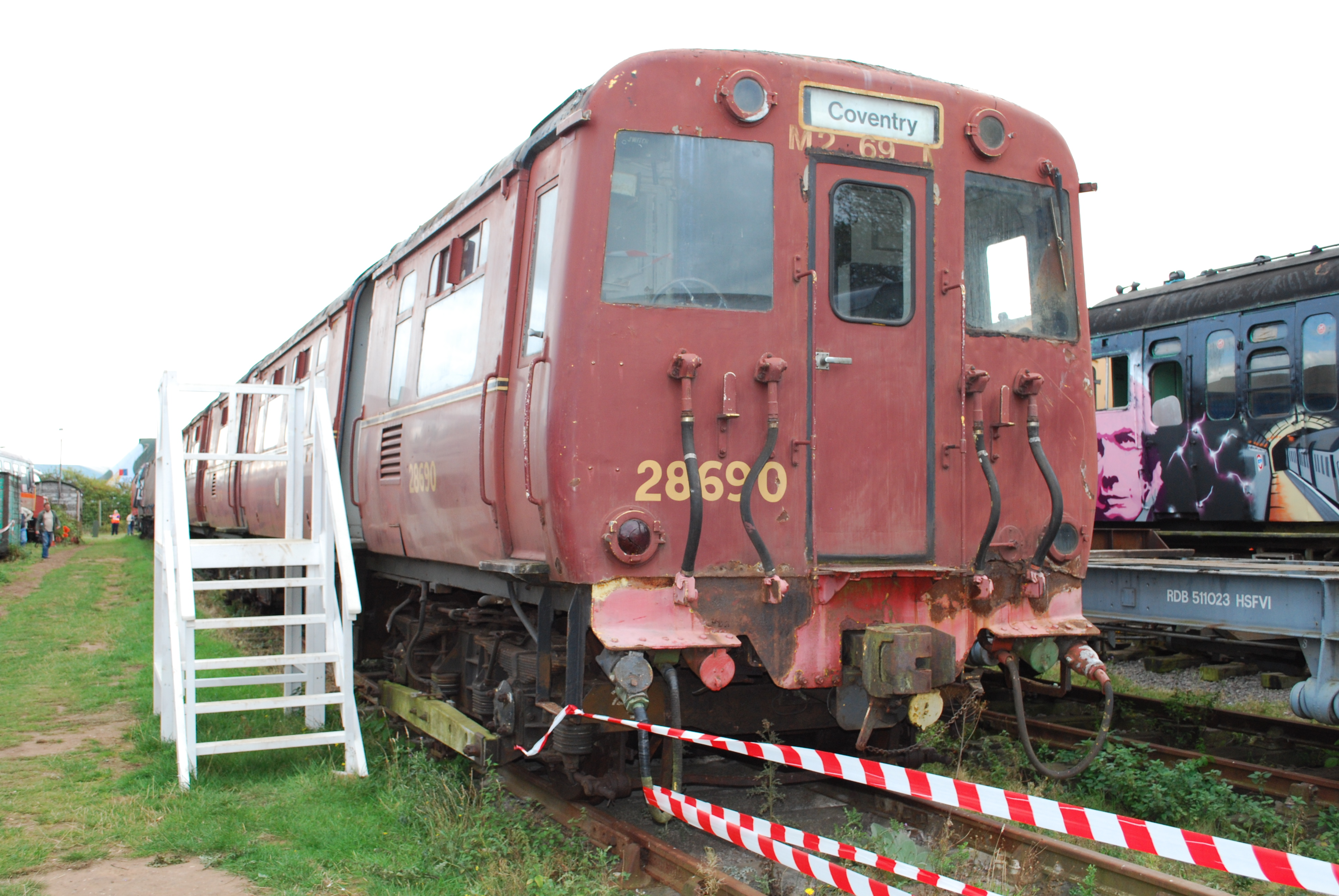
The preserved LMS Wirral and Mersey unit at the Electric Railway Museum, Coventry.

A single set, formed of vehicles 28690, 29720 and 29289, was earmarked for preservation. Though never carried on the unit, the set was numbered under the BR TOPS code as 503 019. This was the last of the units built in 1938 to have been brought into service. Until 2024, the unit was also one of the only two pre-war main line EMUs in existence which are still in original formation, the other being the 2-BIL belonging to the National Railway Museum.

The set was kept in serviceable condition and operated occasional special trains on the Merseyrail network until 1988. During this period, the set was used for the opening of the electrified line between Rock Ferry and Hooton on 30 September 1985 and for special services during Christmas 1985. At the same time, Merseyrail decided not to preserve a second set, due to a lack of spares. Following this, the surviving set participated in the Merseyrail 100 celebration on 6 April 1986. The unit, named Ivor T. Davies G.M. on 14 March 1988, was purchased by Wirral Borough Council in 1991 and stored at Kirkdale until 1996.

Two parts of the set were then sold and kept at Steamport, Southport. Meanwhile, the Driving Trailer coach (DTS) was kept at the Wirral Transport Museum. The two parts of the unit, which were sold, have been owned by the Suburban Electric Railway Association since purchase by its forerunner, the Mersey and Tyneside Electric Preservationists in 1996, and were stored at the Electric Railway Museum on the outskirts of Coventry. After transport of the Driving Trailer coach from Birkenhead, the entire unit was correctly reformed at the Coventry museum in October 2010, for the first time in over 20 years The Driving Motor coach (DMBS) interior was open to the public during museum open days.

In 2017, the Electric Railway Museum announced that it would be forced to close and relocate its collection. The Class 503 set was moved in May 2018, to the Locomotive Storage Ltd facility in the former Hornby Railways warehouse in Margate.

In early 2024, it was announced that two of the three carriages forming the preserved unit would be scrapped. Driving Motor coach (DMBS) 28690 would be retained for a future project. As of 2024, it is stored at the Cambrian Heritage Railways site at Llynclys, Shropshire. The cab of 29289 (up to, and including, the first set of sliding doors) survives at The Cab Yard, near Llanelli, Carmarthenshire.
