= Birkenhead Mollington Street TMD =

Rail depot in Birkenhead, England

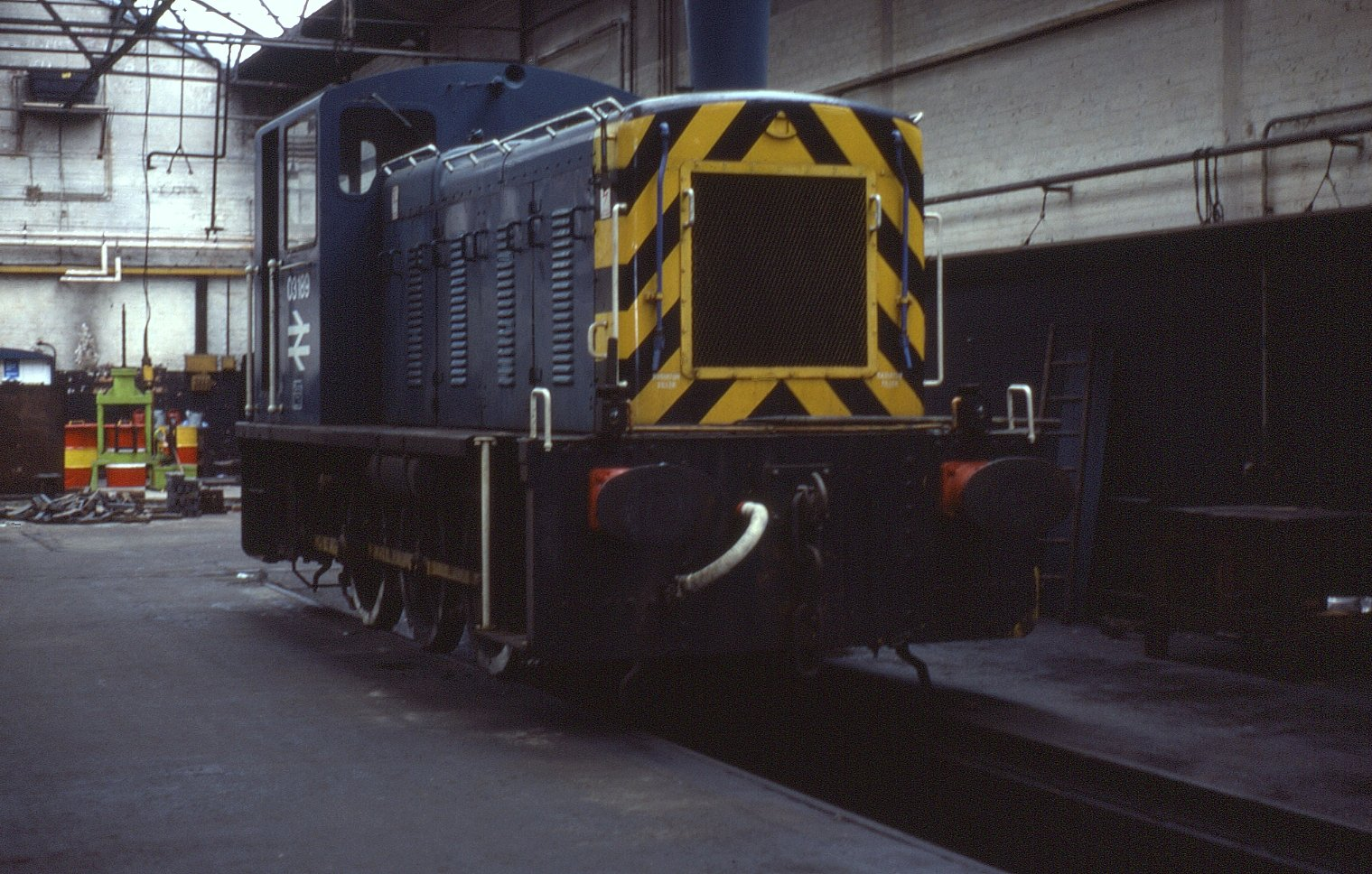
- A British Rail Class 03 inside the depot, 1983.
- Interactive map of Birkenhead Mollington Street TMD

Location
- Location: Birkenhead, Wirral
- Coordinates: 53.3865°N 3.0195°W
- OS grid: SJ322882

Characteristics
- Owner: British Rail (Upon closure)
- Operator: BREL (-1985)
- Type: Steam; Diesel; EMU

History
- Opened: 1879
- Closed: 24 November 1985
- Original: Chester and Birkenhead Railway
- Pre-grouping: LNWR; GWR
- Post-grouping: LMS; GWR
- Former depot code: BHD; 24; 6C (1948-1963); 8H (1963-1973); BC (1973-1985)
- Former rolling stock: Class 503 (1938–85); Class 508 (1979–1985); Class 507 (1978–1985)

Birkenhead Mollington Street TMD is a former traction maintenance depot located at Mollington Street in Birkenhead, England, on the Birkenhead Dock Branch railway. Although never directly connected by rail, the depot was situated less than 200 m (660 ft) from Birkenhead Central railway station. The depot serviced first steam and subsequently diesel locomotives, and some EMU's until 1985, when it was closed and demolished. As of 2018, the depot site remains disused.

== History ==
=== Construction to nationalisation ===
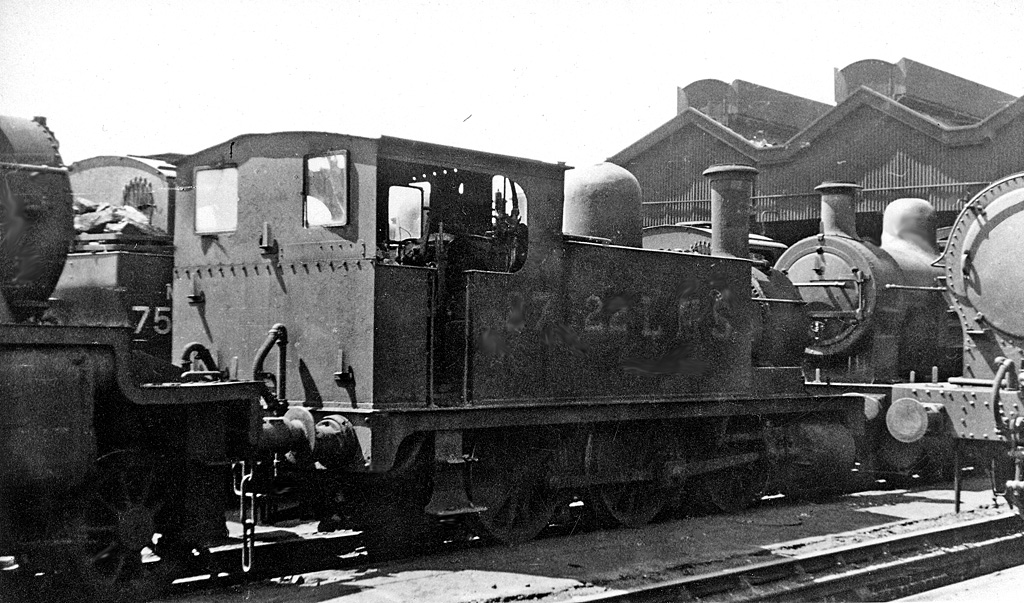
North London Railway Class 75 in 1948.

The Birkenhead Railway was formed on 1 August 1859 as a result of the Birkenhead, Lancashire and Cheshire Railway merging with the Chester and Birkenhead Railway. The new company was originally called the Birkenhead, Lancashire and Cheshire Junction Railway, but in 1859 shortened its name to The Birkenhead Railway. Taken over on 1 January 1860, it became a joint railway owned and operated by the London and North Western Railway (LNWR) and the Great Western Railway (GWR), becoming a joint railway.

The new partners need new and better servicing facilities for their fleets, and so built the new joint-depot in 1878. The shed consisted of two separate but conjoined 8-road straight sheds:

- LNWR: to the north, an eight-road pitched-roof shed. Coaling stage to the west, turntable at the shed throat
- GWR: to the south and closest to the running lines, an eight-road north light pattern roofed shed. Coaling stage to the west, turntable to the south on an entrance siding. Originally coded BHD, it later became 24

=== British Railways ===
On nationalisation, the entire depot came under the control of British Railways London Midland Region, allocated code 6C. Steam locomotives stabled at the depot included: GWR 6800 Class; GWR 5101 Class; GWR 5700 Class; LMS Black Fives; LMS 8F class; and BR standard class 9F.

In 1951, the ex-LNWR shed was reduced in scale by half its width, to allow the construction of a new two-road straight diesel shed in its place. The LNWR coal stage was removed, meaning all coaling moved to the southern GWR coal stage. A new diesel fuelling stage was built on the entrance throat to the new diesel depot.

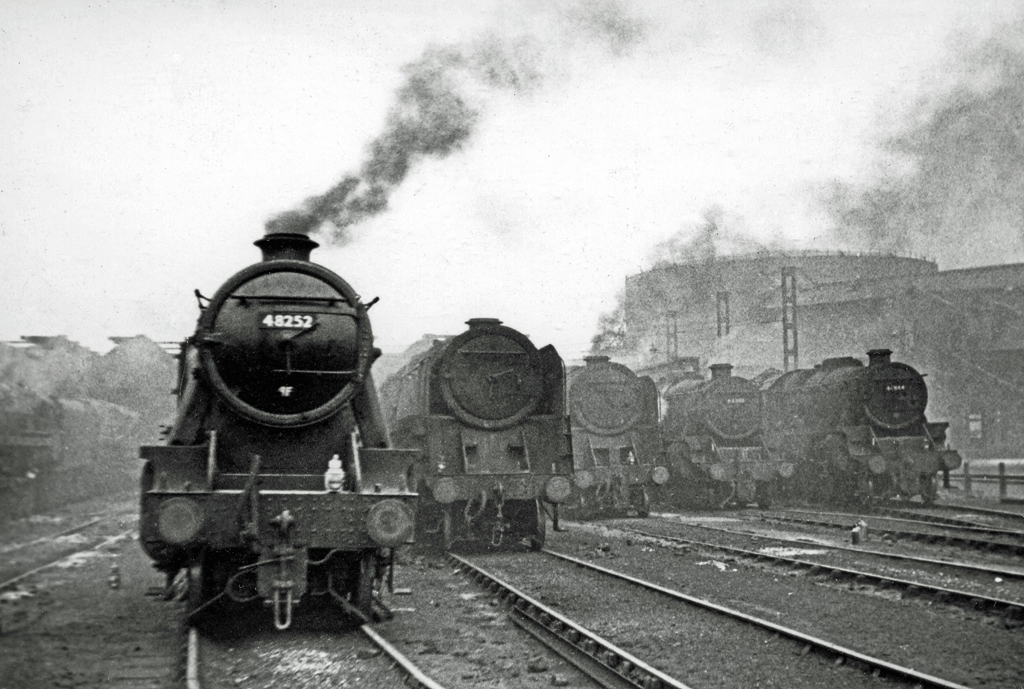
LMS 8F 2-8-0, BR 9F 2-10-0s and LMS 5MT 4-6-0s on the shed in October 1967

Common sights in the 1950s were WD Austerity 2-8-0s and Stanier 'Crab's, with six of the latter usually at the shed at any one time. Allocated shunters included Dock Tanks 47160, (Note: Dock Tank 47160 was later reproduced as a British N gauge model by Minitrix.) 47164 and 47166.

In 1963 as the Beeching cuts were felt, the entire ex-GWR allocation of locos was removed and sent south to Swindon Works for reallocation or scrapping. Nonetheless, up to ninety locomotives on shed could still be seen, on occasion. About half of these would be BR Standard Class 9F 2-10-0s, which worked the heavy iron ore trains from Bidston Dock to the John Summers steelworks in Shotton. The final day of steam operations at the shed was 5 November 1967. The depot code was 8H, between September 1963 and May 1973 and finally BC between May 1973 and closure, in 1985.

==== Diesel era ====
After closure to steam, 9F duties were taken over by Brush Type 4s.

During the final years of the depot, locomotives stabled included Class 03, Class 25, Class 40 and Class 47 traction. Class 03s were also allocated to the depot. In the early 1980s, circa. 1984, during the Merseyrail changeover from Class 503 to Class 508 electric multiple units, those units were also stored at the depot. The depot was closed on 25 November 1985, and demolished in July 1987.
