= Birkenhead Central railway station =

Railway station on the Chester & Ellesmere Port branches of the Wirral line in England

Birkenhead Central
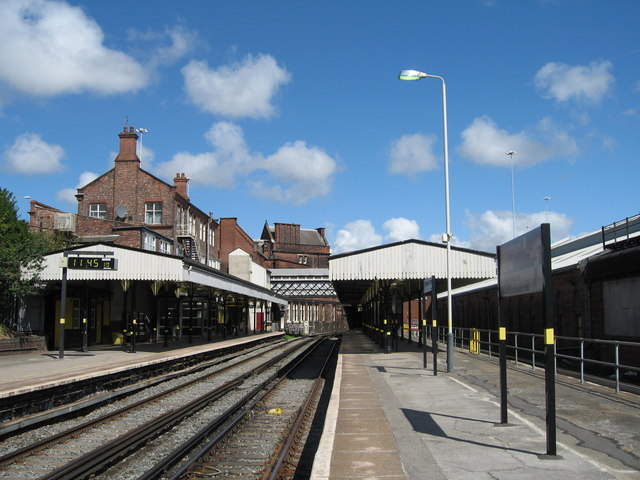

General information
- Location: Birkenhead, Wirral; England
- Coordinates: 53.389°N 3.019°W
- Grid reference: SJ322884
- Manager: Merseyrail
- Transit authority: Merseytravel
- Platforms: 2

Other information
- Station code: BKC
- Fare zone: B1
- Classification: DfT category E

Key dates
- 1886: Opened

Passengers
- 2021/22: ▲0.596 million
- 2022/23: ▲0.627 million
- 2023/24: ▲0.651 million
- 2024/25: ▼0.644 million
- 2025/26: ▲0.688 million
Location
Notes
- Passenger statistics from the Office of Rail and Road

Birkenhead Central is a railway station serving the town of Birkenhead, in Merseyside, England. Located on the south side of Birkenhead town centre, it lies on the Chester and Ellesmere Port branches of the Wirral Line, part of the Merseyrail network.

== History ==
Birkenhead Central station was opened in 1886 as part of the Mersey Railway's route from Liverpool, via the Mersey Railway Tunnel under the River Mersey. The station was the location of the Mersey Railway's headquarters. The disused building of Birkenhead Central depot, which closed in the 1990s, remains adjacent to the platforms. The station platforms were refurbished and finished in 2012.

== Facilities ==
The station is staffed, during all opening hours, and has platform CCTV. There are toilets, several payphones, a vending machine, booking office and live departure and arrival screens, on the platform, for passenger information. Each platform has a waiting shelter, as well as sheltered seating. The station does not have a car park, but does have a secure cycle locker with 28 spaces. Access to the station is by ramp, and there is step-free access to the platforms, for wheelchairs and prams, via the lifts. The station also has a snack bar, in the main booking hall.

== Services ==
Trains operate every 15 minutes between Chester and Liverpool on weekdays and Saturdays until late evening when the service becomes half-hourly, as it is on Sundays. Additionally there is a half-hourly service between Liverpool and Ellesmere Port all day, every day. Northbound trains operate via Birkenhead Hamilton Square station in Birkenhead and the Mersey Railway Tunnel to Liverpool. Southbound trains all proceed as far as Hooton, where the lines to Chester and Ellesmere Port divide. These services are all provided by Merseyrail's fleet of Class 777 EMUs.

== Gallery ==
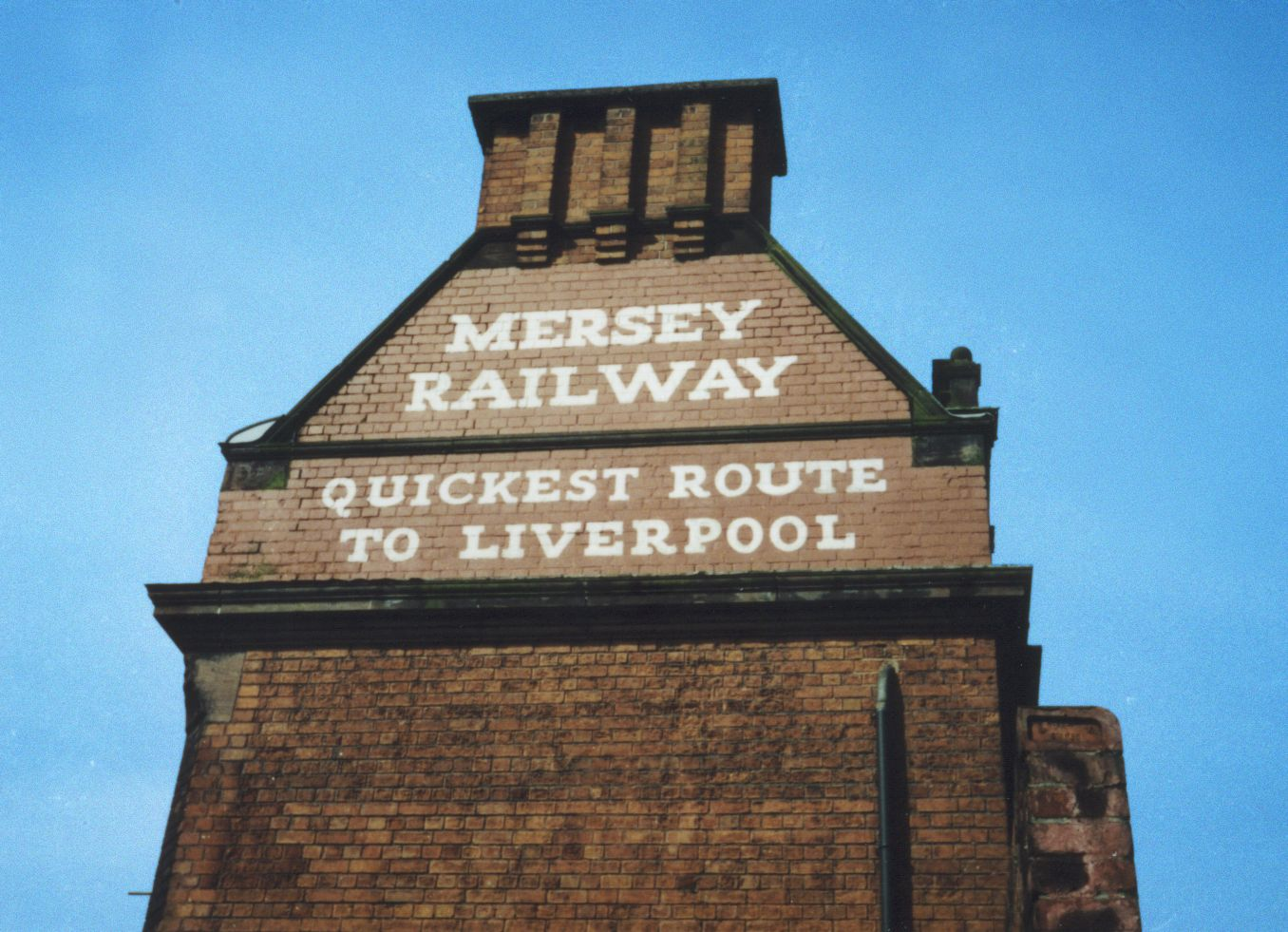
Original Mersey Railway painted sign on Birkenhead Central station, the company's former headquarters.

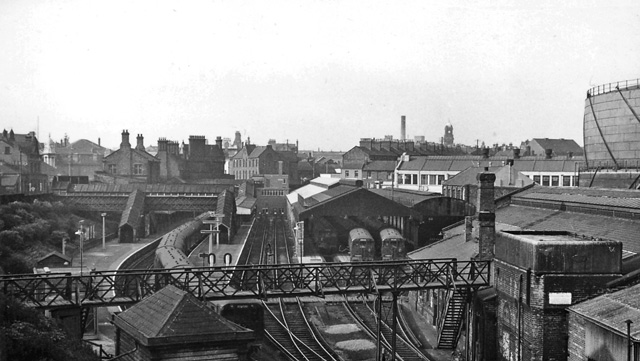
View northward, towards Birkenhead (Hamilton Square) and Liverpool in 1961.

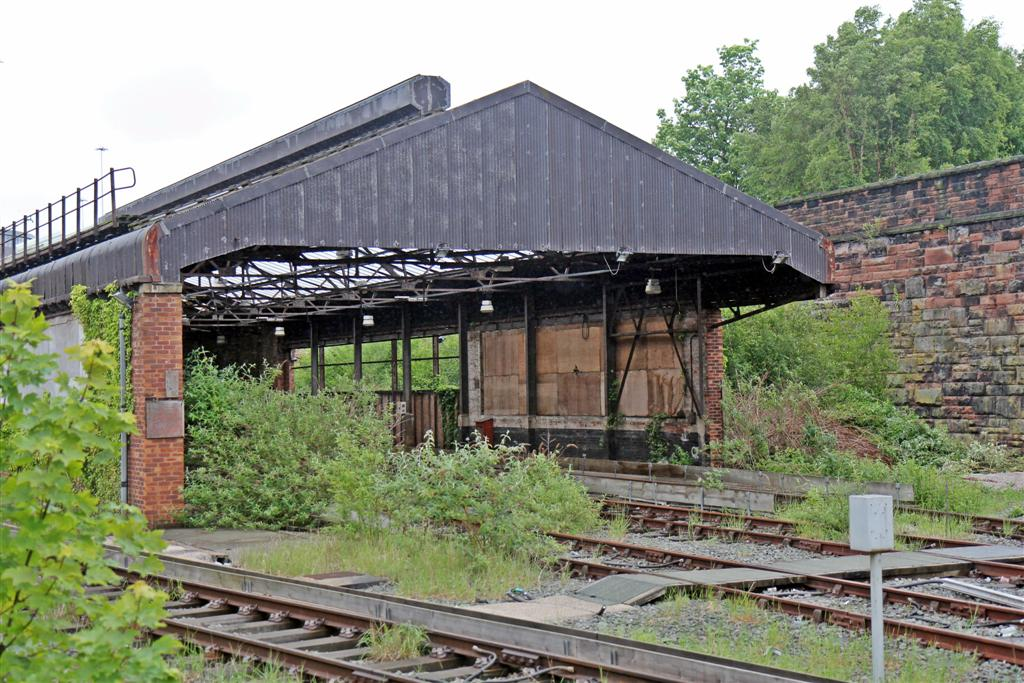
The former Birkenhead Central carriage shed.

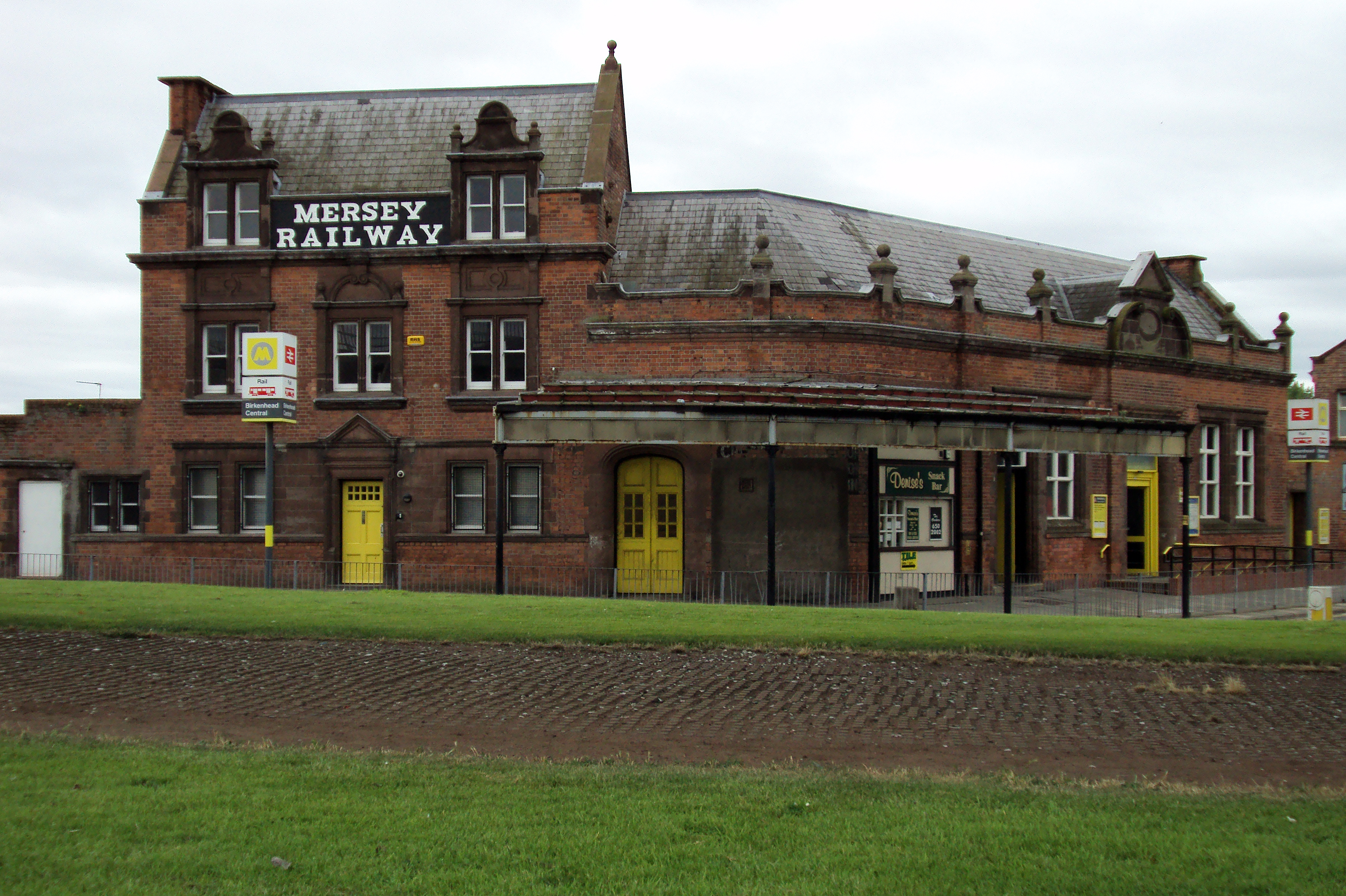
The station building.

== See also ==
- List of underground stations of the Merseyrail network

Preceding station	National Rail	Following station
Green Lane towards Chester or Ellesmere Port	Merseyrail; Wirral Line; Ellesmere Port/Chester	Hamilton Square towards Liverpool Central
