= Mersey Railway electric units =

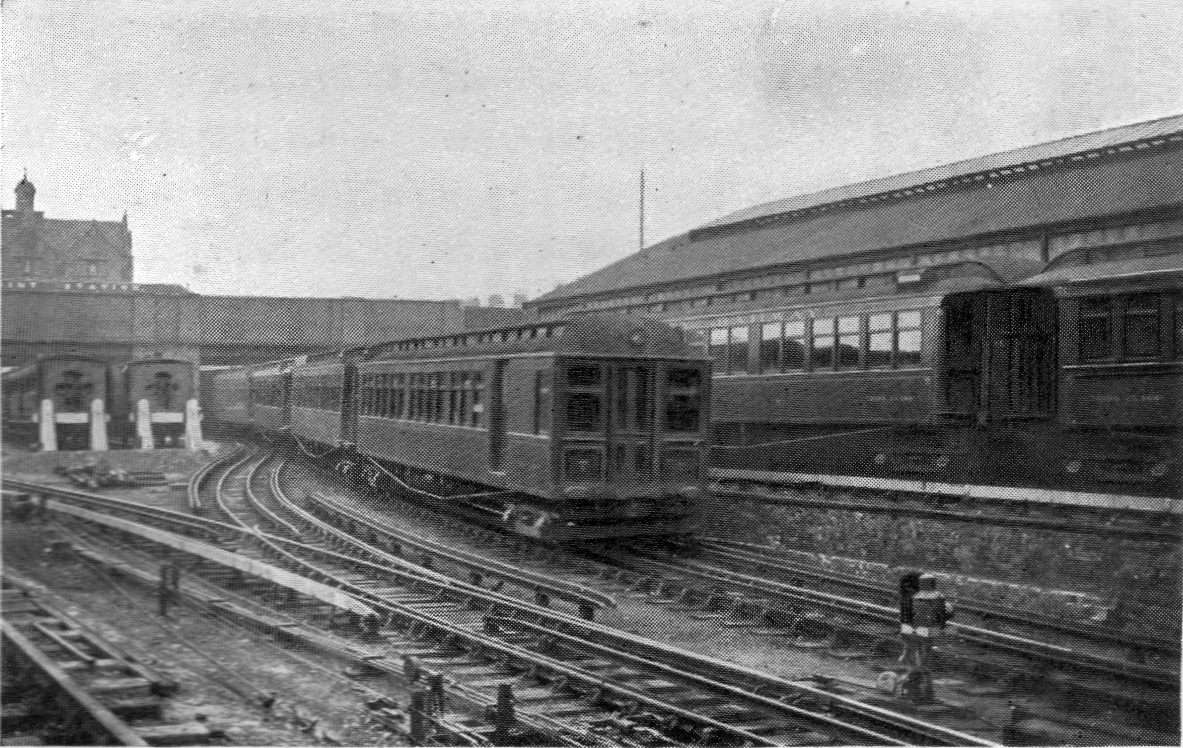
- Mersey Railway electric train leaving Birkenhead Park
- In service: 1903–1957
- Manufacturer: G.F. Milnes, Hadley; Craven; Gloucester C&W; Wolverton
- Replaced: Steam locomotives and carriages
- Constructed: 1903, 1923 and 1936
- Scrapped: 1956–1958
- Number built: 12
- Number scrapped: All
- Successor: LMS Class AM3
- Formation: MF+TF+TT+TT+MT (1903 stock); MF+TF+TT+MT (1923 stock); TT+TT+TT (1936 stock)
- Fleet numbers: 1-12 (MF, 1903) (Note: Units 1-12 were numbered 28404-28416, from 1948, under the 1933 LMS numbering scheme.); 51-63 (TF, 1903) (Note: Units 51-63 were numbered 28787-28798 from 1948.); 75-99 (TT, 1903) (Note: Units 75-99 were numbered 29157-29180 from 1948.); 26-37 (MT, 1903) (Note: Units 26-37 were numbered 28419-28430 from 1948.); 13-14 (MF, 1923) (Note: Units 13-14 were numbered 28417-28418 from 1948.); 64 (TF, 1923) (Note: Unit 64 was numbered 28799 from 1948.); 100-101 (TT, 1923) (Note: Units 100-101 were numbered 29181-29182 from 1948.); 38-39 (MT, 1923) (Note: Units 38-39 were numbered 28431-28432 from 1948.); 102-112 (TT, 1936) (Note: Units 102-112 were numbered 29183-29193 from 1948.)
- Operators: Mersey Railway; British Railways

Specifications
- Car length: 18 metres (59 ft 1 in)
- Width: 2.62 metres (8 ft 7 in)
- Weight: 20 tonnes (20 long tons; 22 short tons)
- Traction system: Westinghouse 4 × 115 hp (1903); Westinghouse 4 × 125 hp (1923); MV 4 × 125 hp (1923)
- Electric system(s): 600 V DC third and fourth rail
- Current collector(s): Contact shoe
- Bogies: Baldwin equalised
- Braking system(s): Air-brakes
- Track gauge: 4 ft 8 1/2 in (1,435 mm)

Mersey Railway electric multiple units were electric multiple units introduced on the underground Mersey Railway, now a part of Merseyrail, in 1903. In the early 1900s the railway was bankrupt as it used steam locomotives that left a dirty atmosphere in the tunnel and passengers preferred the ferries. However, the railway was rescued by Westinghouse Electric, who electrified the railway and provided the first electric multiple units. The cars were supplemented in 1908, 1923 and 1925 and finally in 1936 to allow the progression from 4-car, through 5-car, and finally to 6-car trains. In 1938, when the Wirral Railway was electrified, the units were modified to allow through running between the two systems. In 1956–57 the cars were replaced by units similar to those used on the Wirral Railway.

== Service introduction ==
In the early 1900s the Mersey Railway was bankrupt. The steam locomotives then used left a dirty atmosphere in the tunnel that mechanical ventilation was unable to remove. Passengers preferred the ferries. However, the railway attracted the attention of George Westinghouse, an American looking for business for his UK works, the British Westinghouse Electric and Manufacturing Co. Ltd that opened at Trafford Park in 1899. Westinghouse considered the railway would be profitable with electric traction and undertook to fund electrification, promising to complete in eighteen months.

In 1903, 24 motor cars and 33 trailers were provided by Westinghouse. The stock was of an American design, with a clerestory roof and open gated ends. Unheated accommodation was in saloons and the wooden bodies were British built, the bogies had been made by Baldwin Locomotive Works in America. All cars were 8 feet 7 inches (2.62 m) wide, the motor cars were 59 feet (18 m) long and weighed 36 1/2 long tons (37.1 t) and the trailers 58 feet (18 m) long and weighed 20 long tons (20 t). First and Third Class cars were provided, the first class seats being natural rattan, the third class seats being moulded plywood. The livery was maroon with white roofs and "Mersey Railway" in gold left on the upper fascia panels. Air-brakes were provided with storage reservoirs that were recharged at the terminal stations. The motor cars were powered with Westinghouse motors controlled by the Westinghouse low voltage multiple unit train control system.

Once the original cars had their ends enclosed, all cars, original and subsequent, motor and trailer, had the same basic interior layout, with inward swinging end doors into vestibules, leading to a large saloon with two bays of transverse seats in the centre, and lengthy longitudinal seats towards each end, allowing for standing passengers in the centre. As the longest journey on the Mersey was 11 minutes. Liverpool Central to Rock Ferry, comfort was not a significant issue, but nevertheless there was considerable provision of first class, two cars of five (after the 1936 lengthening, two of six).

=== In service ===
The inaugural service ran on 3 May 1903. The trains originally operated from Liverpool Central to Rock Ferry and Birkenhead Park. Following the electrification of the former Wirral Railway in 1938, electric services were extended to West Kirby and New Brighton. The older Mersey units then commonly operated the New Brighton and Rock Ferry branches during the week, and the West Kirby route on Sundays, while the new LMS units operated to and from West Kirby on weekdays, and to New Brighton and Rock Ferry on Sundays.

== Additional vehicles ==
An additional four trailers were received in 1908 with British bogies, and in 1912 the open ends were boxed in. In 1923 two motor-cars were ordered from Cravens with four 125 horsepower (93 kW) motors, and in 1925 a five-car train was received from the same manufacturer. To allow the introduction of 6-car train in 1936, ten steel-bodied third class trailer (TT) units were built by Gloucester RCW. The Cravens and Gloucester cars did not have a clerestory roof; however, any car could work in multiple with any other car and mixed formation trains were normal.

On 14 March 1938, the Wirral Railway was electrified and through running between the two companies became possible. When the Mersey Railway trains were modified to run on the Wirral Railway, heaters and air-compressors were added.

One final car was built following the destruction of original Milnes Trailer Third No. 84 by bombing in Birkenhead in 1940. The LMS helped out, and built at Wolverton works in 1944 a comparable car No. 112 (later M29193M). It was all steel and looked similar to the Gloucester RCW additional cars built a few years previously. It only lasted for 12 years before the fleet was withdrawn.

== Replacement ==
Following the nationalisation of the Mersey Railway as part of British Rail, the Mersey Railway became part of the London Midland Region alongside the former Wirral Railway lines. The Mersey cars were replaced in 1956-7 by vehicles to the same design as the ex-LMS units introduced with the former Wirral Railway electrification in 1938, lightweight three car multiple units which were eventually classified as Class 503. The final Mersey unit was withdrawn in March 1957.

Car no. 1, a first class motor coach, was destroyed in a fire at Derby carriage works paint shop in 1957, where it had been taken for overhaul in preparation for restoration and preservation.
