= Heswall railway station =

Railway station in Merseyside, England

Heswall
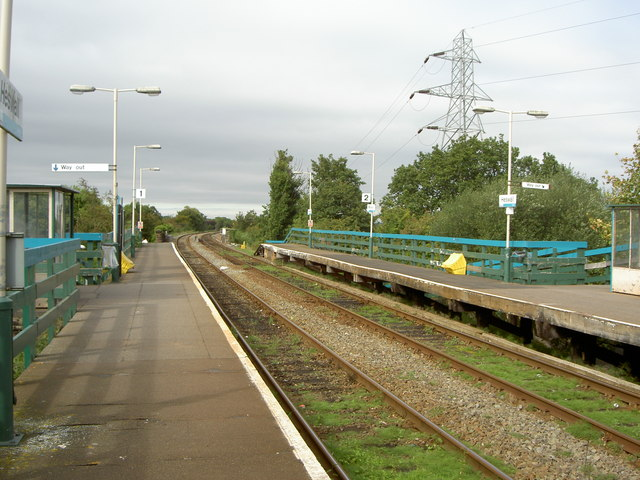

General information
- Location: Heswall, Metropolitan Borough of Wirral, England
- Coordinates: 53.330°N 3.074°W
- Grid reference: SJ286819
- Manager: Transport for Wales
- Transit authority: Merseytravel
- Platforms: 2

Other information
- Station code: HSW
- Fare zone: B2
- Classification: DfT category F2

History
- Original company: North Wales and Liverpool Joint Railway
- Pre-grouping: Great Central Railway
- Post-grouping: London and North Eastern Railway

Key dates
- 1 May 1898: Opened as Heswall Hills
- 7 May 1973: Renamed Heswall

Passengers
- 2020/21: ▼19,894
- 2021/22: ▲51,680
- 2022/23: ▲60,182
- 2023/24: ▲63,256
- 2024/25: ▲91,244
Location
Notes
- Passenger statistics from the Office of Rail and Road

Heswall railway station serves the town of Heswall, on the Wirral Peninsula, in Merseyside, England. It is a stop on the Borderlands Line between Bidston and Wrexham Central; the station and all trains serving it are operated by Transport for Wales. It was previously known as Heswall Hills, when there was another station serving the town; this was a stop on the Birkenhead Railway's former branch line between West Kirby and Hooton, and now forms part of the Wirral Way rail trail.

== History ==
The railway line between Bidston and Hawarden Bridge was authorised on 31 July 1885. It was originally a line that was owned jointly by the Wirral Railway (WR) and the Wrexham, Mold and Connah's Quay Railway (WMCQ); however, in 1889, the WR share was transferred to the Manchester, Sheffield and Lincolnshire Railway (MS&LR). Construction began in 1892; the line went through several changes of name and, by the time of its opening (goods 16 March 1896, passengers 18 May), was known as the North Wales and Liverpool Joint Railway.

A station known as Heswall Hills was opened two years later on 1 May 1898. In due course, the MS&LR became the Great Central Railway (GCR), which absorbed the WMCQ on 1 January 1905. By the time of the 1923 Grouping, the line was wholly owned by the GCR and so became part of the London and North Eastern Railway on 1 January 1923.

Heswall Hills station was renamed Heswall on 7 May 1973.

The station had an extensive goods yard with sidings to the south-west of the station; daily shunting operations were carried out until the advent of diesel railcar operations in 1960, at which time light freight operations ceased. The yard continued to be used until 30 October 1965. The goods yard and sidings were sold off for a housing development in around 1967.

The line continued to be used for heavy freight, as iron ore trains also passed through the station. These freight trains operated from Bidston Dock to the John Summers steelworks in Shotton. The steam locomotives could be heard at night for at least five miles climbing Storeton Bank, from Upton station to Heswall. The Class 9F locomotive 92203, later named as Black Prince, worked the final steam-hauled iron ore train in November 1967. The freight service itself ended around 1980.

== Facilities ==
The station facilities are somewhat rudimentary and is unstaffed at nearly all times. Each of the two platforms has a waiting shelter with seating. There is a payphone, with live departure and arrival screens for passenger information, but no booking office. There is a small station car park, with space for 16 cars. Wheelchair and pram access to the platforms is possible, via the access ramps.

== Services ==
The station is generally served by a train every 45 minutes in each direction between Bidston and Wrexham Central. On Sundays, services depart every 90 minutes in each direction.

| Preceding station | National Rail | Following station |
|---|---|---|
| Neston | Transport for Wales; Borderlands Line | Upton |
| | Historical railways | |
| Neston | Great Central Railway; North Wales and Liverpool Railway | Storeton |

== Future ==
Proposals have been put forward to electrify the track as part of the Borderlands Electrification scheme. Merseyrail would like to see the line electrified to link with its own third-rail service, with a doubling of the frequency of services. This would allow the station to serve as a part of a direct service to Liverpool.

In June 2018, as part of the new KeolisAmey franchise, it was announced that the frequency of trains on the line would increase to twice-hourly from December 2021. However, in September 2021, this was delayed to May 2022.

In May 2022, the planned timetable with the increased service was revised with the additional services removed, therefore any increase in frequency was scrapped for May 2022, due to timetable conflict with freight services. As of September 2025, the service frequency increase has not been approved by the Office of Rail and Road.
