= Upton railway station =

Railway station on the Borderlands Line, in Wirral, England

Coordinates: 53°23′09″N 3°05′02″W

Upton
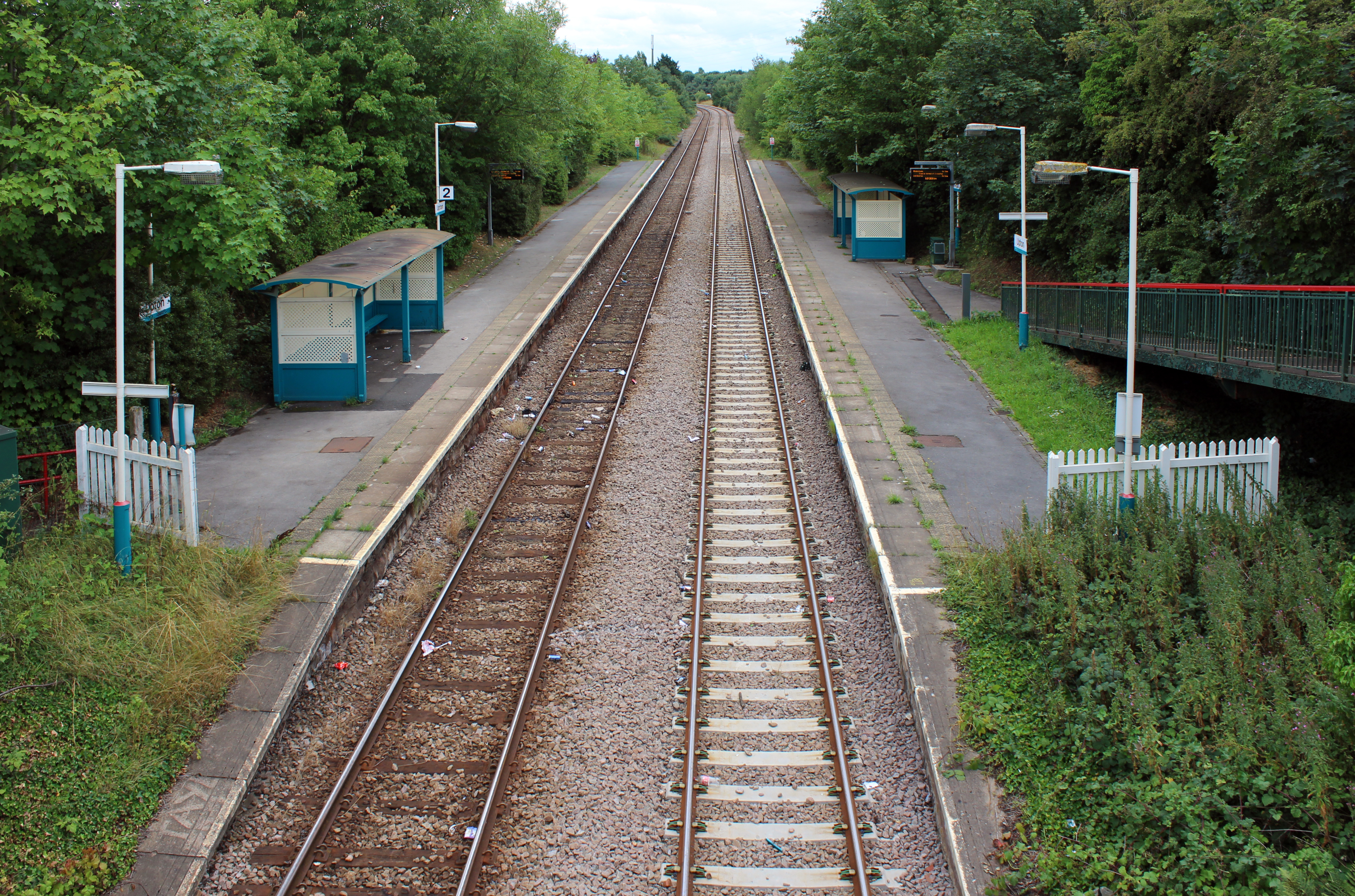

General information
- Location: Upton, Wirral; England
- Grid reference: SJ279882
- Manager: Transport for Wales
- Transit authority: Merseytravel
- Platforms: 2

Other information
- Station code: UPT
- Fare zone: B1
- Classification: DfT category F2

Key dates
- 1896: Opened

Passengers
- 2021/22: ▲12,784
- 2022/23: ▲18,278
- 2023/24: ▼15,360
- 2024/25: ▲22,192
- 2025/26: ▲29,388
Location
Notes
- Passenger statistics from the Office of Rail and Road

Upton railway station serves Upton and the Noctorum area of Birkenhead, on the Wirral Peninsula, England. The station is situated on the Borderlands line. Transport for Wales operates the station and all trains serving it.

== History ==
Upton Station was opened to passengers on 18 May 1896, as part of the Dee and Birkenhead Railway. The station became part of the North Wales and Liverpool Railway, less than three months later, on 7 July 1896.

The station had a booking office on the road bridge which spans the two platforms. Staffing ended on 20 April 1969, with the booking office removed during redevelopment of the station and expansion of the road bridge in the 1970s. The station had a brick-built waiting room situated on each platform.

=== Freight and goods ===
Adjacent to the station there was a coal and goods yard with a cattle pen. From 1 February 1965, the goods yard only handled coal, and closed on 28 April 1969. The site of the goods yard now has a Co-operative supermarket. Access to the yard was operated by a small signal box with a 24-lever frame, which was used until 25 June 1969. The signal box was situated at the southern end of the Bidston-bound platform.

Iron ore freight trains also passed through the station. These freight trains operated from Bidston Dock to the John Summers steelworks in Shotton. The Class 9F locomotive 92203, later named as Black Prince, worked the final steam-hauled iron ore train in November 1967. The freight service itself ended around 1980.

== Future ==
Proposals have been put forward to electrify the track as part of the proposed Borderlands line electrification scheme. Merseyrail would like to see the line electrified and incorporated into the Wirral line to link with its own third-rail service, with a doubling of the frequency of services. This would allow the station to serve as a part of a direct service to Liverpool.

Transport for Wales have an Adopt a Station initiative. Upton station is on their list of adopted stations and has been adopted by a member, or members, of the public.

In June 2018 it was announced that, as part of the new KeolisAmey operation of the Wales & Borders franchise, the frequency of trains on the line would increase to 2tph from December 2021. This was then delayed to May 2022.

However, in May 2022, the planned timetable with the increased service was revised with the additional services removed, therefore any increase in frequency was scrapped, due to timetable conflict with freight services, as of September 2025, the service frequency increase has not been approved by the Office of Rail and Road.

== Facilities ==
The station facilities are somewhat rudimentary. Although longer, each platform is surfaced to receive four carriages only. The station is unstaffed at nearly all times, but has platform CCTV. Each of the two platforms has a waiting shelter with seating. There is no payphone or booking office, but there are electronic departure and arrival screens for live information to passengers. There is no official station car park, but very limited parking outside the station, at the drop-off point, on the old Ford Road bridge. Wheelchair and pram access to each of the two platforms is possible, and relatively easy, via the ramp-staircases. Though, as yet, platform access has not been modernised to the standard of that at Hooton.

== Services ==
From Monday to Saturday, there is a service every 45 minutes between Bidston and Wrexham Central (two-hourly in the evening and on Bank Holidays). There is a service every 90 minutes each way on Sundays. Services are timed according to a Class 153 Super Sprinter DMU, although usually provided by a Transport for Wales Class 150/2 Sprinter DMU.

Preceding station	National Rail	Following station
Heswall	Transport for Wales; Borderlands Line	Bidston
	Historical railways	
Storeton	Great Central Railway; North Wales and Liverpool Railway	Bidston

== Bibliography ==
- Jermy, Roger C. (1987). A Portrait of Wirral's Railways. Birkenhead: Countryvise. ISBN 0-907768-17-2. OCLC 18682851.
- Merseyside Railway History Group (1994). Railway Stations of Wirral. Prenton: Ian & Marilyn Boumphrey. ISBN 1-899241-02-7. OCLC 500124599.
- Mitchell, Vic; Smith, Keith (2013). Wrexham to New Brighton. West Sussex: Middleton Press. ISBN 9781908174475. OCLC 859543196.
- Shannon, Paul; Hillmer, John (2002). Liverpool and Wirral. British Railways Past and Present, 39. Kettering: Past and Present Publishing. ISBN 1-85895-199-2. OCLC 57393951.
