= Neston railway station =

Railway station in Cheshire, England

Neston
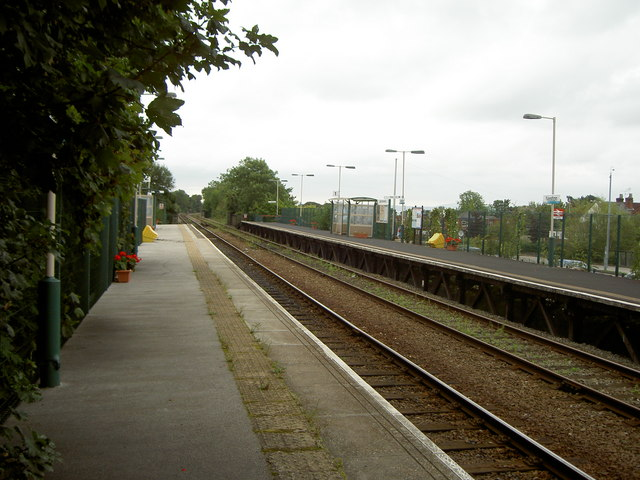

General information
- Location: Neston, Cheshire West and Chester, England
- Coordinates: 53.292°N 3.064°W
- Grid reference: SJ292777
- Manager: Transport for Wales
- Platforms: 2

Other information
- Station code: NES
- Classification: DfT category F2

Key dates
- 1896: Opened as Neston & Parkgate
- 15 September 1952: Renamed Neston North
- 6 May 1968: Renamed Neston

Passengers
- 2021/22: ▲24,074
- 2022/23: ▲33,242
- 2023/24: ▼28,412
- 2024/25: ▲41,204
- 2025/26: ▲49,878
Location
Notes
- Passenger statistics from the Office of Rail and Road

Neston railway station serves the town of Neston, in Cheshire, England. It is the southernmost station on the English part of the Borderlands Line before it reaches Wales; it lies 8 3/4 miles (14.1 km) south of Bidston.

== History ==
There was once a substantial station building on the Bidston-bound platform. This fell into disrepair in the late 1990s and was finally demolished when the station was modernised for Disability Discrimination Act compliance in 2003.

== Facilities ==
The station is unstaffed and only 'bus shelter' type structures offer passengers any protection from the elements. Bus interchange is available from the stop on Ladies Walk, adjacent the Bidston-bound platform. There is a small car park next to the Wrexham-bound platform, with eight spaces.

== Services ==
The station is generally served by a train every 45 minutes in each directions between Bidston and Wrexham Central. On Sundays, services depart every 90 minutes in each direction.

Preceding station	National Rail	Following station
Hawarden Bridge	Transport for Wales; Borderlands Line	Heswall
	Historical railways	
Burton Point	Great Central Railway; North Wales and Liverpool Railway	Heswall

== Future ==
Long-standing plans to electrify the Borderlands Line have been put on hold due to the prohibitive cost of installing third-rail electrification. This has led Merseytravel to look at other options for the line, including the possibility of overhead lines.
