= Chester Golf Club Halt railway station =

Disused railway station in Chester, Cheshire

Chester Golf Club Halt

General information
- Location: Deeside; Wales
- Coordinates: 53.2199°N 3.0288°W
- Grid reference: SJ314697
- Platforms: 2

Other information
- Status: Disused

History
- Original company: Manchester, Sheffield & Lincolnshire Railway
- Pre-grouping: Manchester, Sheffield & Lincolnshire Railway

Key dates
- 1891: Opened
- 18 May 1896: Closed
Location

Chester Golf Club Halt served Chester Golf Club in Deeside, Flintshire, Wales, from 1891 to 1896 on the Borderlands line.

== History ==
The station was opened in 1891 by the Manchester, Sheffield & Lincolnshire Railway. It was situated to the north of what was later Hawarden Bridge Halt. Work began on developing the line by the North Wales and Liverpool Railway Committee. When the work was completed, this station was moved to an unsuitable location, so it closed on 18 May 1896 and was replaced by Birkenhead Junction Golf Club Platform, which was to the north.

Preceding station	Historical railways	Following station
Sealand Rifle Range Halt; Line open, station closed	Borderlands line Manchester, Sheffield & Lincolnshire Railway	Hawarden Bridge; Line and station open
