= Burton Point railway station =

Former railway station on the North Wales and Liverpool Railway in Cheshire, England

Burton Point
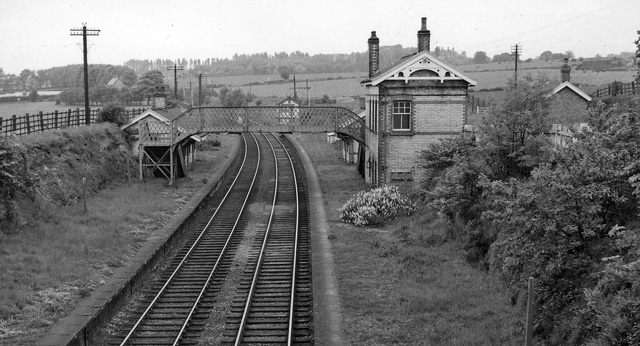
- Burton Point railway station in 1961, six years after closure

General information
- Location: Burton, Wirral Peninsula, Cheshire West and Chester; England
- Coordinates: 53.2634°N 3.0459°W
- Grid reference: SJ303745
- Platforms: 2

Other information
- Status: Disused

History
- Original company: North Wales and Liverpool Railway
- Pre-grouping: Great Central Railway
- Post-grouping: London and North Eastern Railway

Key dates
- 1 August 1899: Opened
- 5 December 1955: Closed
Location

Burton Point railway station was located on the northern side of Station Road, at Burton, Cheshire, England. The station opened on 1 August 1899 on the North Wales and Liverpool Railway. The station closed to passengers, and completely, on 5 December 1955. Although the platform waiting rooms and footbridge were demolished after closure, the yellow and redbrick main building remains in use as part of a garden centre and the platforms are still in existence. The line through the former station remains in use as part of the Borderlands Line.

Preceding station	Disused railways	Following station
Sealand Rifle Range Halt	Great Central Railway; North Wales and Liverpool Railway	Neston
