= Bidston railway station =

Railway station in Merseyside, England

Coordinates: 53.409°N 3.079°W

Bidston
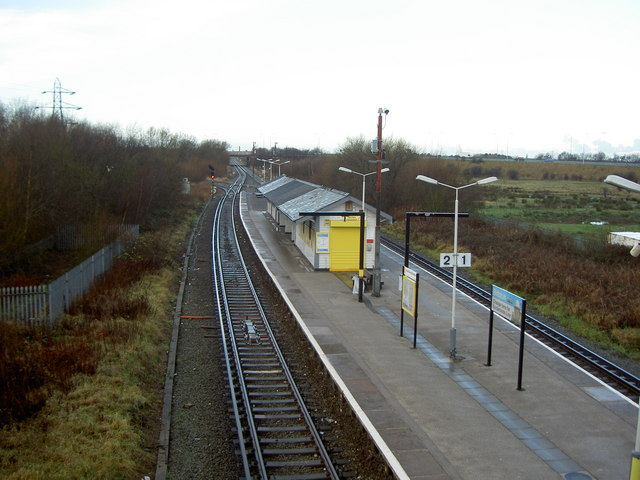
- Bidston station in 2007, seen from the footbridge, facing west towards Leasowe

General information
- Location: Bidston, Wirral; England
- Grid reference: SJ283908
- Managed by: Merseyrail
- Transit authority: Merseytravel
- Platforms: 2

Other information
- Station code: BID
- Fare zone: B1
- Classification: DfT category E

Key dates
- 2 July 1866: Opened
- 4 July 1870: Closed
- 1 August 1872: Reopened
- June 1890: Closed
- 18 May 1896: Reopened as a junction
- 1938: Electrified

Passengers
- 2020/21: ▼0.109 million
- Interchange: ▼19,027
- 2021/22: ▲0.237 million
- Interchange: ▲68,227
- 2022/23: ▲0.271 million
- Interchange: ▲76,964
- 2023/24: ▲0.297 million
- Interchange: ▼76,621
- 2024/25: ▲0.301 million
- Interchange: ▲102,377
Location
Notes
- Passenger statistics from the Office of Rail and Road

Bidston on the Wirral Line

Bidston railway station serves the village of Bidston, in Merseyside, England. It is situated at a junction of the West Kirby branch of the Wirral line, which is part of the Merseyrail network; it also serves as the northern terminus for the Borderlands line to Wrexham Central, with services operated by Transport for Wales.

== History ==
Bidston station has, for most of its existence, been primarily an interchange point. It is relatively isolated, except for nearby Bidston Village, and was accessed only by foot. Until 1970, the approach road to the station was an unpaved track. Due to its isolation when a through station, it was closed twice due to poor passenger usage.

The station was originally built by the Hoylake Railway, opening on 2 July 1866 as an intermediate through station on their line from Birkenhead Dock to the east to Hoylake to the west. The Birkenhead Dock terminus was a tramway railway interchange station, with onward journeys to Birkenhead Woodside ferry by horse drawn street trams of the Wirral Tramway. The station first closed on 4 July 1870, reopening on 1 August 1872. In 1878, the Hoylake Railway line was extended to West Kirby on the River Dee coast to the west. In 1888, the line was extended to Birkenhead Park station, which was an interchange station to Liverpool via the Mersey Railway. The old tramway interchange terminus at Birkenhead Dock was converted to a goods station.

The station was again closed in June 1890, due to low passenger numbers, but was permanently reopened on 18 May 1896 as the northern terminus of the new North Wales and Liverpool Railway. The southern terminus was at Hawarden Bridge, which joined onto the Wrexham, Mold and Connah's Quay Railway line to Wrexham Central. In 1898, Bidston ceased to be a terminus station with the line extended to Seacombe in Wallasey; it became a passenger interchange station.

Through trains to Liverpool commenced in 1938, when the London Midland and Scottish Railway electrified the line from Birkenhead Park to West Kirby. During the earlier half of the twentieth century, Bidston station was known as Bidston Dee Junction and was a busy interchange between the Wirral line electric services and the Seacombe to Wrexham and Chester Northgate steam trains. In 1960, the Wrexham service changed to diesel trains. At the same time, the northern terminus of the line was diverted further north to terminate at New Brighton due to the closure of Seacombe station. The section of line from Bidston to New Brighton was closed in 1971, due to poor passenger use, with the line from Wrexham terminating at Birkenhead North. However, it was subsequently cut back to Bidston and the station became a terminus again on the Borderlands Line in October 1978.

The section of curve between Bidston West and North Junctions, on the wye to the east of the station, was severed on 28 November 1983. This removed the direct route to New Brighton for passengers and Bidston Dock for freight.

=== Signal boxes ===
Bidston had four signal boxes in 1899; these were situated alongside the Dee, West, East and North junctions. The nearest to the station was the Bidston Dee Junction box. The second Dee Junction signal box was built in the 1930s by the London, Midland and Scottish Railway and was much larger than the earlier signal box, which had been built by the Wirral Railway. It had a 65-lever frame and also took over the operation of Bidston North Junction, once built. Bidston Dee Junction signal box was closed on 17 September 1994 and was demolished two months later on 20 November.

=== Engine shed and freight use ===
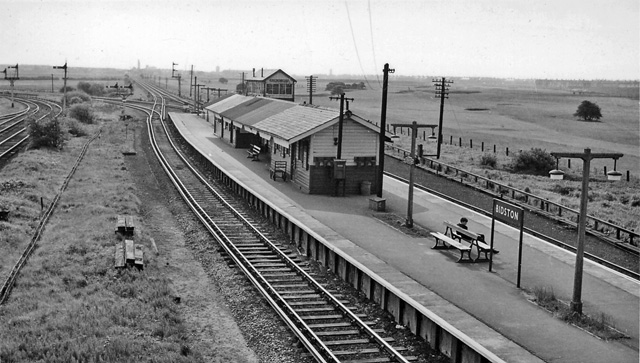
The station in 1961, facing towards Leasowe. The lines to the sidings and engine shed are in front of the signals to the left; Bidston Dee Junction signal box is behind the platform.

Bidston station had a nearby engine shed, shed code 6F, which principally operated the Wrexham line. The building was somewhat south of the running lines, halfway between Bidston and Birkenhead North stations. The shed was built by the Manchester, Sheffield and Lincolnshire Railway in 1897 and had two tracks inside. The shed had a water tank and a coaling stage for steam locomotives. Examples of locomotives that could be found at the shed included the LNER Class J94 Austerity, which was used around the Birkenhead docks, and the BR Standard Class 9F, which hauled iron ore trains from Bidston Dock to the John Summers steelworks in Shotton. The engine shed closed on 11 February 1963, along with transfer of its allocation of locomotives to Birkenhead Mollington Street depot. The shed remained intact for several years after closure.

Several sidings were situated adjacent to the eastern side of the station, south of the running lines. These sidings had been built prior to 1899 and were removed after goods traffic ended on 29 July 1968. A Tesco supermarket now occupies the site of these sidings.

The station was the nearest to the former Bidston Dock. The adjacent Bidston East Junction gives access to the former Birkenhead Dock Branch line, but this has been disused by freight workings since the mid-1980s.

== Facilities ==
The station has a booking office, shelter and toilet facilities. Each side of the island platform can receive six carriages. The station is staffed at all times during opening hours and has platform CCTV. Each platform has open-air seating. There is a payphone, next to the ticket office, on platform 1.

The station provides a Park and Ride service, with 198 car parking spaces, which are free to use for travellers. There is no access to the platform for passengers with wheelchairs or prams, as access is by staircase only. A Bike & Go shelter opened at the station, which provides secure cycle storage for 28 cycles.

== Services ==
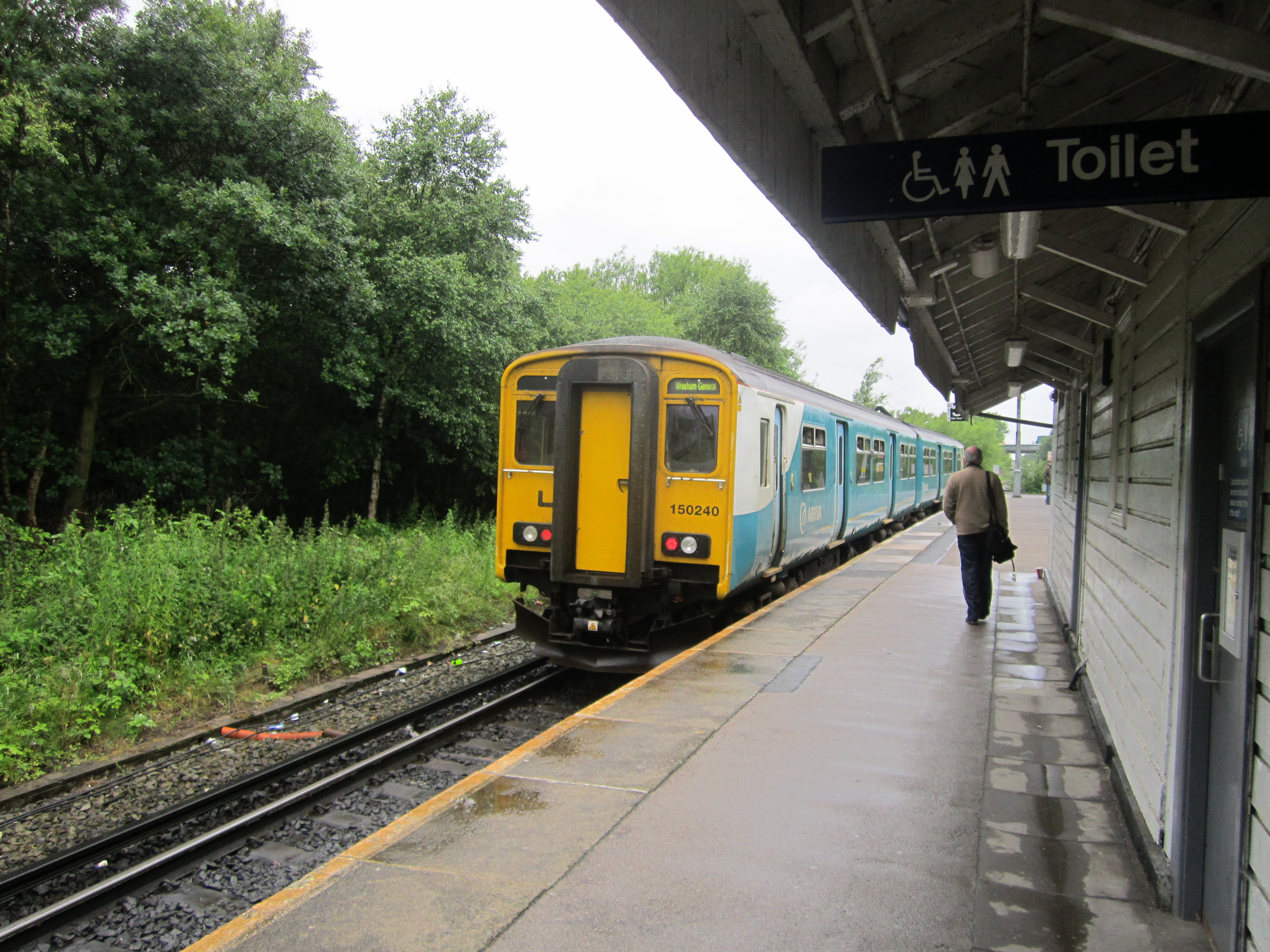
An Arriva Trains Wales service, waiting to depart to Wrexham General on platform 2

Bidston is served by two train operating companies:

- Merseyrail services generally run every 15 minutes to West Kirby and Liverpool Central, from platforms 2 and 1 respectively, with fewer trains on evenings and Sundays. Class 777 electric multiple units are used.
- Transport for Wales operates services to Wrexham Central every 45 minutes, with fewer trains on evenings and Sundays. These usually terminate/start from platform 2, using Class 197 or Class 230 diesel multiple units.

Preceding station	National Rail	Following station
Leasowe towards West Kirby	Merseyrail; Wirral Line; West Kirby Branch	Birkenhead North towards Liverpool Central
Upton	Transport for Wales; Borderlands Line	Terminus
	Disused railways	
Liscard and Poulton	Wirral Railway; Seacombe Branch	Terminus

== Future ==
Proposals have been made to electrify some or all of the Borderlands Line and possibly incorporate it into the Wirral Line services, but no commitment has been made as of 2007.
