= Storeton railway station =

Former railway station in England

Storeton
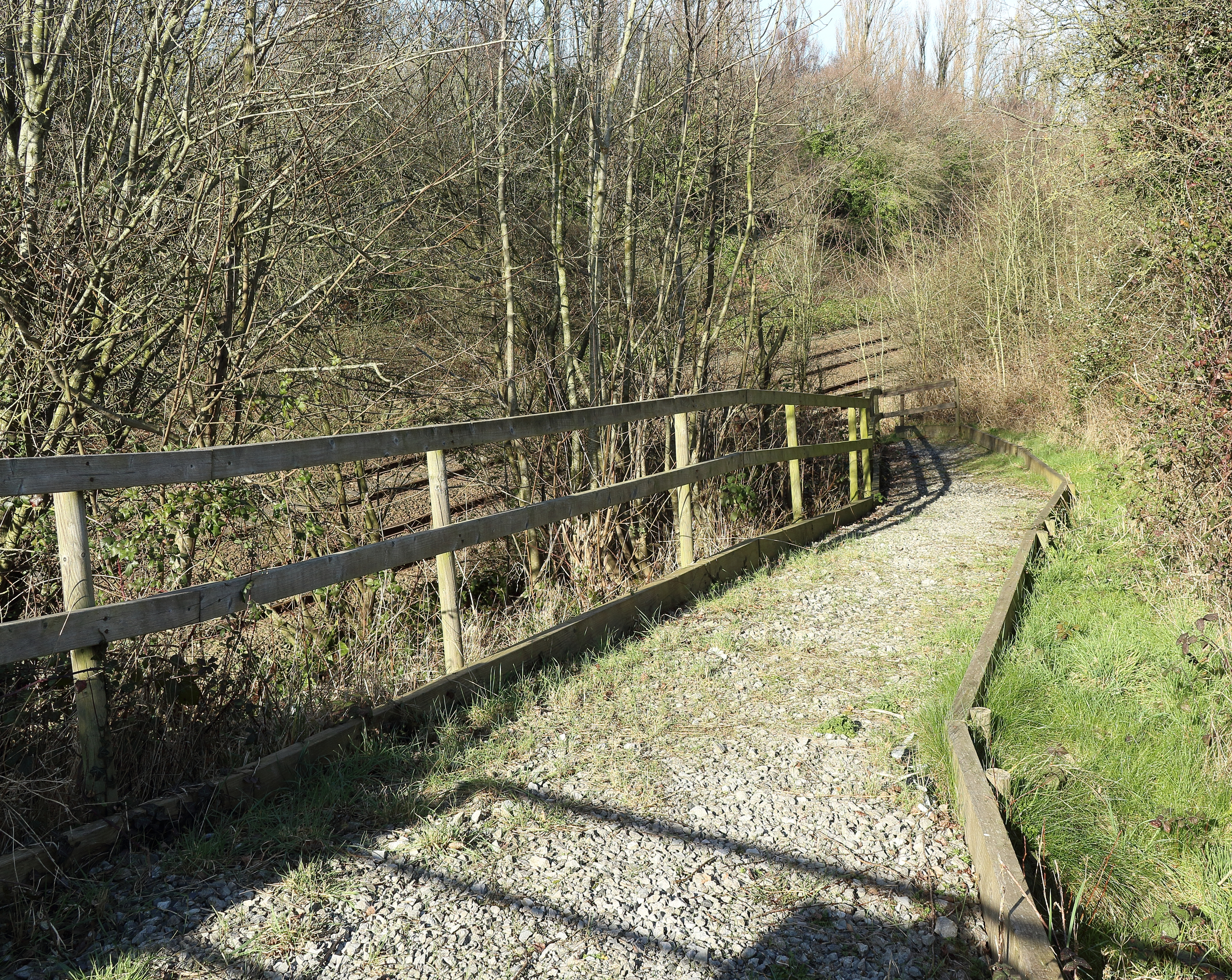
- View to the former location of the southbound platform of Storeton station

General information
- Location: Storeton, Metropolitan Borough of Wirral; England
- Coordinates: 53.3494°N 3.0671°W
- Grid reference: SJ291842
- Platforms: 2

Other information
- Status: Disused

History
- Original company: North Wales and Liverpool Railway
- Pre-grouping: Great Central Railway
- Post-grouping: London and North Eastern Railway

Key dates
- 1896: Opened
- 1900: Renamed Storeton for Barnston
- 1933: Renamed Storeton
- 1951: Closed to passengers
- 1964: Closed
Location

Storeton railway station was located on the northern side of Station Road, between Barnston and Storeton, England.

== History ==
Originally named Barnston, it opened on 18 May 1896 on the North Wales and Liverpool Railway. The station was renamed as Storeton for Barnston on 1 May 1900, and simply as Storeton in 1933. The station closed to passengers on 3 December 1951 and finally closed on 3 February 1964. The station had a 23-lever signal box, south of the road bridge, which operated the lines to the adjacent goods yard and was used until 2 July 1965.

Preceding station	Disused railways	Following station
Heswall	Great Central Railway; North Wales and Liverpool Railway	Upton
