= Henry Weale =

Welsh Victoria Cross recipient (1897–1959)

- Weale circa 1919
- Born: 2 October 1897; Shotton, Flintshire, Wales
- Died: 13 January 1959 (aged 61); Rhyl, Denbighshire, Wales
- Burial place: Rhyl Cemetery
- Military career
- Allegiance: United Kingdom
- Branch: British Army
- Rank: Sergeant
- Units: Royal Welsh Fusiliers
- Conflicts: First World War
- Awards: Victoria Cross

Henry Weale VC (2 October 1897 – 13 January 1959) was a Welsh recipient of the Victoria Cross, the highest and most prestigious award for gallantry in the face of the enemy that can be awarded to British and Commonwealth forces.

He was a 20 years old Lance-Corporal in the 14th Battalion, Royal Welsh Fusiliers, British Army when on the 26 August 1918 during the First World War, the following deed took place at Bazentin-le-Grand in France, for which he was awarded the VC.

For most conspicuous bravery and initiative in attack. The adjacent battalion having been held up by enemy machine guns, L./Cpl. Weale was ordered to deal with the hostile posts. When his Lewis gun failed him, on his own initiative he rushed the nearest post and killed the crew, then went for the others, the crews of which fled on his approach, this gallant N.C.O. pursuing them. His very dashing deed cleared the way for the advance, inspired his comrades, and resulted in the capture of all the machine guns.

He later achieved the rank of sergeant.

Weale died in Rhyl, Denbighshire aged 61 on 13 January 1959 and is buried at Rhyl Cemetery. In 2010 a memorial garden was opened in his memory in his birth town of Shotton, while the Army Reserve centre in Queensferry, Flintshire, is now named the Henry Weale VC Hall.

== The medal ==
His Victoria Cross is displayed at the Royal Welch Fusiliers Museum, Caernarfon Castle, Gwynedd, Wales.

== Bibliography ==
- Monuments to Courage (David Harvey, 1999)
- The Register of the Victoria Cross (This England, 1997)
- Gliddon, Gerald (2014) [2002]. Road to Victory 1918. VCs of the First World War. The History Press. ISBN 978-0750953610.
