= Birkenhead Dock railway station =

Former railway station in Birkenhead, Wirral, England

Birkenhead Dock

General information
- Location: Birkenhead, Wirral; England
- Coordinates: 53.4071°N 3.0581°W
- Grid reference: SJ297905
- Platforms: 1

Other information
- Status: Disused

History
- Original company: Hoylake Railway
- Pre-grouping: Wirral Railway
- Post-grouping: London, Midland and Scottish Railway

Key dates
- 2 July 1866: Opened
- 6 September 1873: Tram interchange opened
- 2 January 1888: Closed to passengers
- 1938: Closed for goods
Location

Birkenhead Dock railway station was situated in Birkenhead, Wirral, England. The station opened as the eastern terminus of the Hoylake Railway in 1866. With the opening of the horse drawn Woodside and Birkenhead Dock Street Tramway in 1873, the station probably became the world's first tram to train interchange station. The station was closed to passengers in 1888 being superseded by Birkenhead Docks railway station which was later named Birkenhead North. The former passenger station was renamed Birkenhead Dock Goods, with the platforms still in existence in 1937, with the goods station closing the following year. The site was used as railway sidings until the 1990s.

Preceding station	Historical railways	Following station
Bidston; Line and station open	London, Midland and Scottish Railway; Wirral Railway	Terminus; Line and station closed
