= Birkenhead Junction Golf Club Platform railway station =

Disused railway station in Chester, Cheshire

Birkenhead Junction Golf Club Platform

General information
- Location: Deeside; Wales
- Coordinates: 53.226642°N 3.0272913°W
- Grid reference: SJ315704
- Platforms: 2

Other information
- Status: Disused

History
- Original company: Manchester, Sheffield & Lincolnshire Railway
- Pre-grouping: Great Central Railway
- Post-grouping: London and North Eastern Railway

Key dates
- 18 May 1896: Opened
- 20 September 1927: Closed
Location

Birkenhead Junction Golf Club Platform served Chester Golf Club in Deeside, Flintshire, Wales, from 1896 to 1927 on the Borderlands line.

== History ==
The station was opened on 18 May 1896 by the Manchester, Sheffield & Lincolnshire Railway. It was situated to the north of what was Chester Junction, now part of the Dee Marshes cycling route. It replaced the earlier Chester Golf Club Halt to the south. The club building was to the southeast of the southbound platform and further to the south was the signal box. Behind the northbound platform were a set of sidings that served a steelworks. It wasn't shown in public timetables as it was used by members of the nearby golf club and by workmen of the nearby steel works. The station closed on 20 September 1927. The steelworks continued to develop and expand their sidings until the 1970s.

Preceding station	Historical railways	Following station
Sealand Rifle Range Halt; Line open, station closed	Borderlands line Manchester, Sheffield & Lincolnshire Railway	Chester Golf Club Halt; Line open, station closed
