= Liscard and Poulton railway station =

Former railway station in Wirral, England

Coordinates: 53.4133°N 3.0524°W

Liscard and Poulton
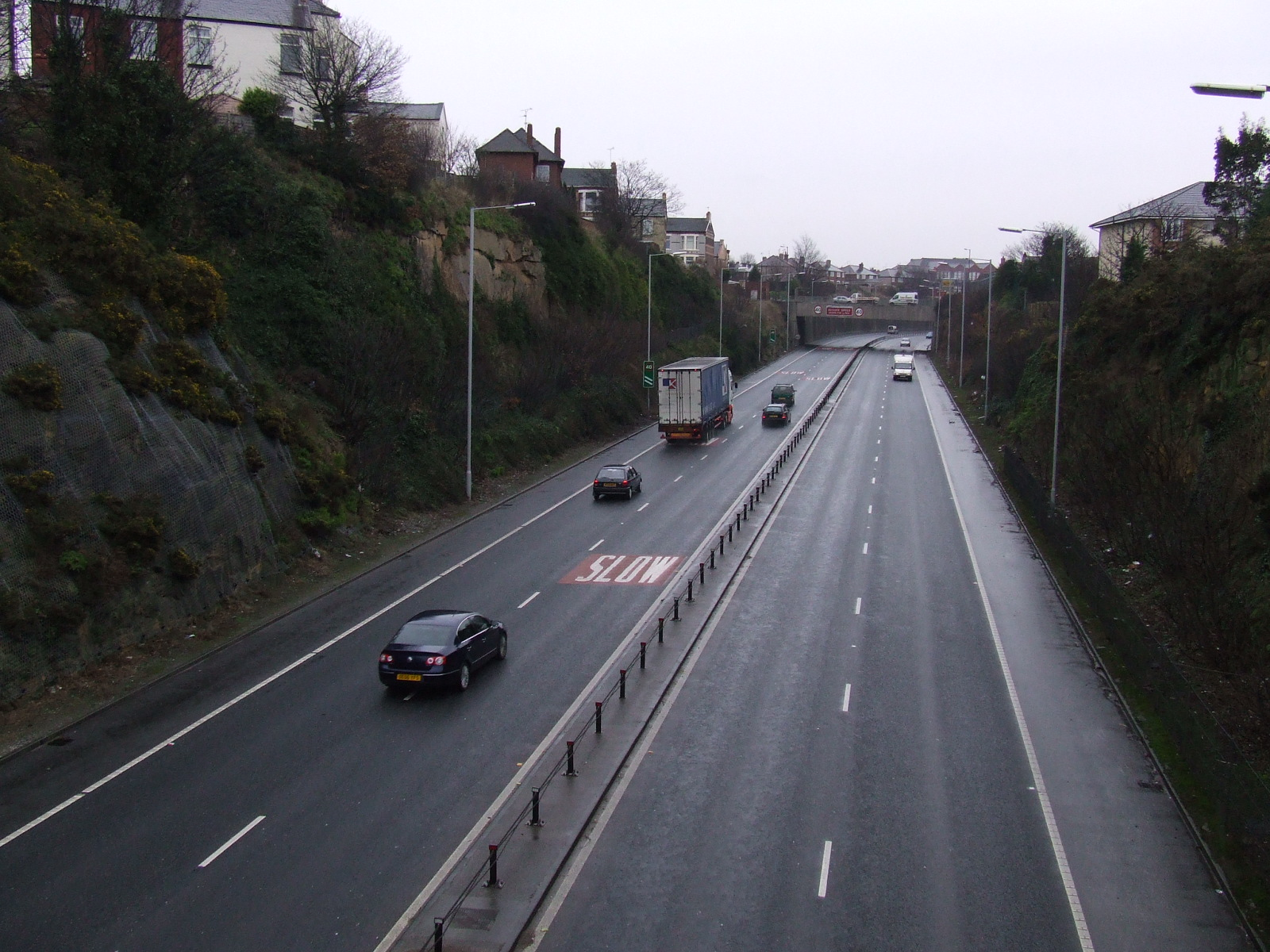
- The site of the former Liscard & Poulton railway station, now the approach road from the M53 mid Wirral motorway into the Wallasey Tunnel.

General information
- Location: Wallasey, Wirral; England
- Platforms: 2

Other information
- Status: Disused

History
- Original company: Wirral Railway
- Pre-grouping: Wirral Railway
- Post-grouping: London, Midland and Scottish Railway

Key dates
- 1 June 1895: Station opened
- 4 January 1960: Station closed
Location

Liscard and Poulton railway station was located in Wallasey, Wirral, Cheshire and was an intermediate station on the Seacombe branch of the Wirral Railway.

== History ==
The station opened to passengers on 1 June 1895, hosting regular passenger services to Wrexham, Chester, West Kirby and New Brighton. The station consisted of an island platform, located deep in a sandstone cutting accessed from a road bridge on Mill Lane, with a booking office at street level. A coal siding with an adjoining sloping approach road were also located at the station.

Passenger numbers were poor, although the line was also regularly used by goods traffic. When the majority of the Wirral Railway was electrified in 1938, the Seacombe branch was omitted.

=== Closure ===
The station was closed to passengers on 4 January 1960, although the line did continue to serve goods trains up until 1963. The route was then used to form the approach road to the Kingsway (Wallasey) Tunnel.

Preceding station	Disused railways	Following station
Seacombe & Egremont; Line and station closed	London, Midland and Scottish Railway; Wirral Railway	Bidston; Line closed, station open
Seacombe & Egremont; Line and station closed	London, Midland and Scottish Railway; Wirral Railway	Birkenhead North; Line closed, station open
Seacombe & Egremont; Line and station closed	London, Midland and Scottish Railway; Wirral Railway	Wallasey Village; Line closed, station open
