= Billy Tudor =

Welsh footballer

Personal information
- Full name: William Henry Tudor
- Date of birth: 14 February 1918
- Place of birth: Shotton, Wales
- Date of death: 1965 (age 46 or 47)
- Height: 5 ft 10 in (1.78 m)
- Position: Defender

Youth career
- 1934–1935: West Bromwich Albion

Senior career*
Years	Team	Apps	(Gls)
1935–1939	West Bromwich Albion	31	(0)
1946–1949	Wrexham	56	(2)
1949–1950	Bangor City	?	(?)
1950–1951	Pwllheli	?	(?)
1951–1952	Flint Town United	?	(?)
- * Club domestic league appearances and goals

William Henry Tudor (1918–1965) born in Shotton, Flintshire, was a Welsh professional footballer who played in the Football League as a defender.
