= Leasowe railway station =

Railway station serving Leasowe, Merseyside, England

Coordinates: 53.408°N 3.100°W

Leasowe
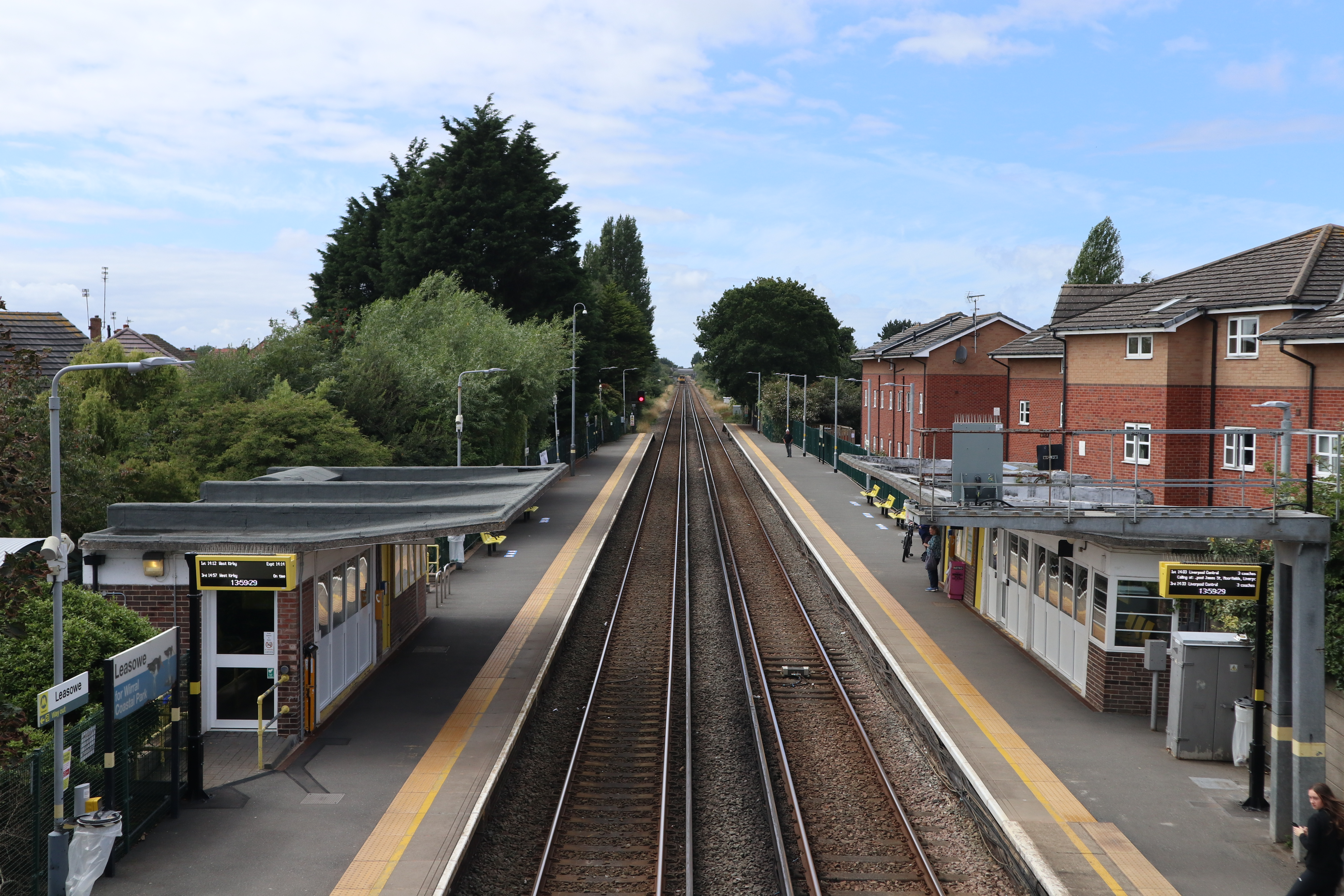
- A view of the station from the footbridge in 2023.

General information
- Location: Leasowe, Wirral; England
- Grid reference: SJ270907
- Manager: Merseyrail
- Transit authority: Merseytravel
- Platforms: 2

Other information
- Station code: LSW
- Fare zone: B1
- Classification: DfT category E

Key dates
- 4 July 1870: Opened as Leasowe Crossing
- 1 August 1872: Closed
- 5 May 1894: Reopened
- 1938: Electrified

Passengers
- 2021/22: ▲0.424 million
- 2022/23: ▲0.501 million
- 2023/24: ▲0.530 million
- 2024/25: ▼0.521 million
- 2025/26: ▼0.567 million
Location
Notes
- Passenger statistics from the Office of Rail and Road

Leasowe railway station is a station serving the village of Leasowe, in Merseyside, England. It lies on the West Kirby branch of the Wirral Line, part of the Merseyrail network.

== Location ==
The station is in Reeds Lane, on the edge of Moreton and around 500 metres south of the village of Leasowe which is on the north Wirral coast. It is just 1 km east of Moreton station on the same line, and has a Park and ride facility for commuters to Liverpool.

== History ==
Leasowe station was originally opened on the Hoylake Railway in 1870, as Leasowe Crossing without a proper platform, but it closed less than two years later. The station opened again on 5 May 1894, when the line from Bidston (1.5 km to the east) to Moreton was doubled. It was built by the Wirral Railway on their line from Birkenhead Park to West Kirby.

Through electric services to Liverpool Central commenced on 13 March 1938, when the LMS electrified the lines from Birkenhead Park to West Kirby. The service was provided by the then-new LMS electric multiple units. However, on Sunday mornings, the service was provided by the older Mersey Railway electric units, which had until then only run from Liverpool to Birkenhead Park. The platform buildings were replaced in 1938, rebuilt in a similar style to those along the line towards West Kirby, and a footbridge was added. The signal box, used to operate the level crossing and replacing a cabin on the westbound platform, was moved to the opposite side of Reeds Lane and was also improved at the time.

The station did not have a goods yard; it just had two lines straight through. Nonetheless, freight did pass through the station from the nearby Cadbury factory, also in Moreton. The 8-lever signal box was in use until 24 July 1994, and demolished afterwards.

== Facilities ==
The station is staffed, during all opening hours, and has platform CCTV. Each of the two platforms has a waiting room. There is a payphone, booking office and live departure and arrival screens, for passenger information. The station has a free "Park and Ride" car park, with 204 spaces, lighting columns and CCTV to meet Merseytravel's Travelsafe requirements, as well as a cycle rack. There is step-free access, to the booking office and platforms, for wheelchairs and prams.

== Services ==
Current services are every 15 minutes (Monday to Saturday daytime) to West Kirby and Liverpool. At other times, trains operate every 30 minutes. These services are provided by Merseyrail's fleet of Class 777 EMUs.

The station also has a number of connecting Merseytravel bus services.

== Gallery ==
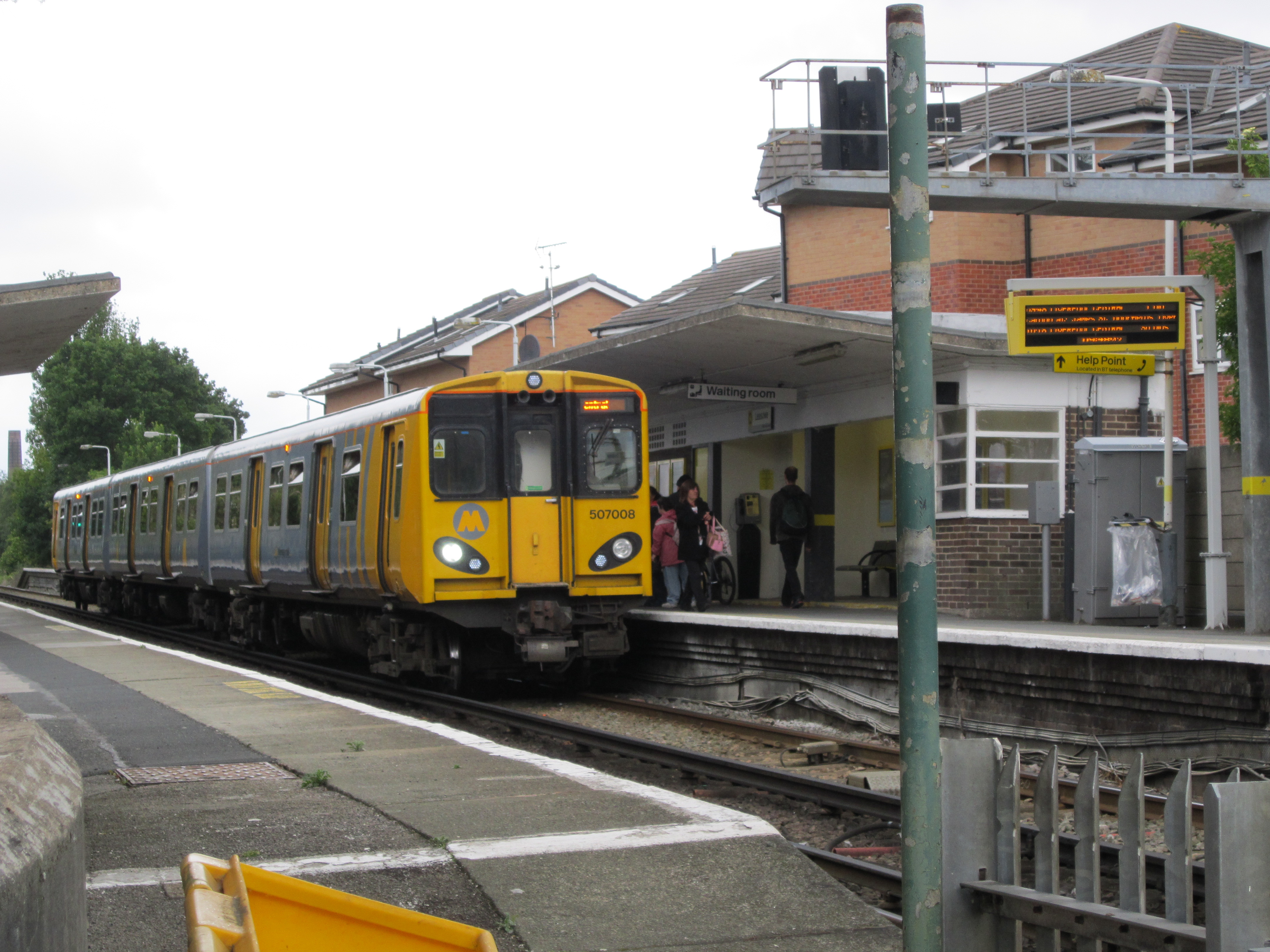
A Merseyrail Class 507 unit waits with a service to Liverpool.

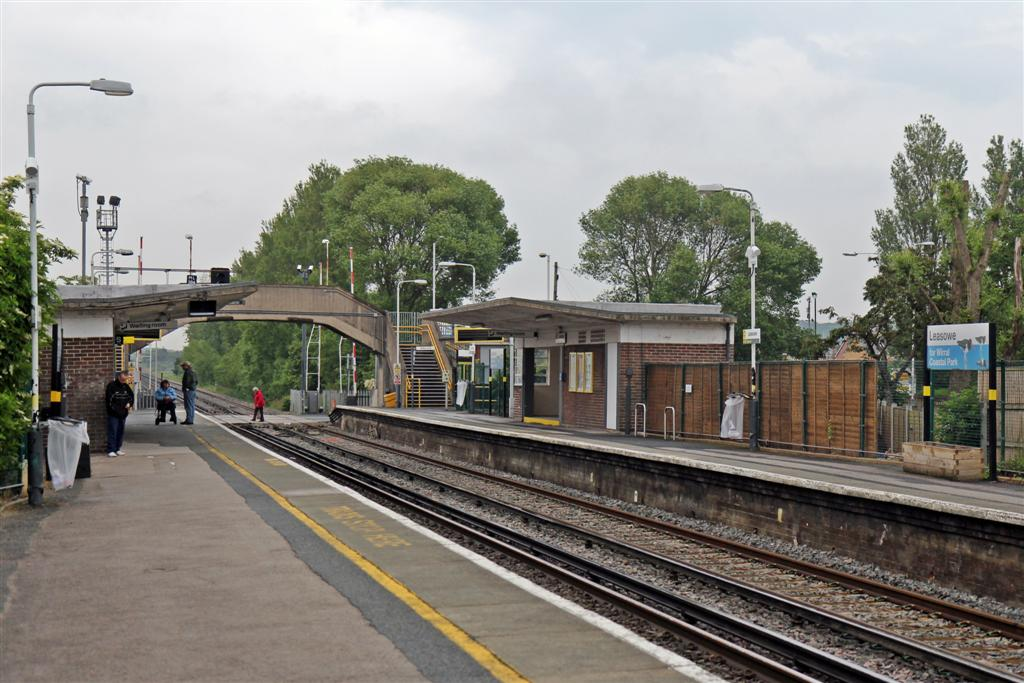
A view, towards Bidston, of the platforms, footbridge and level crossing.

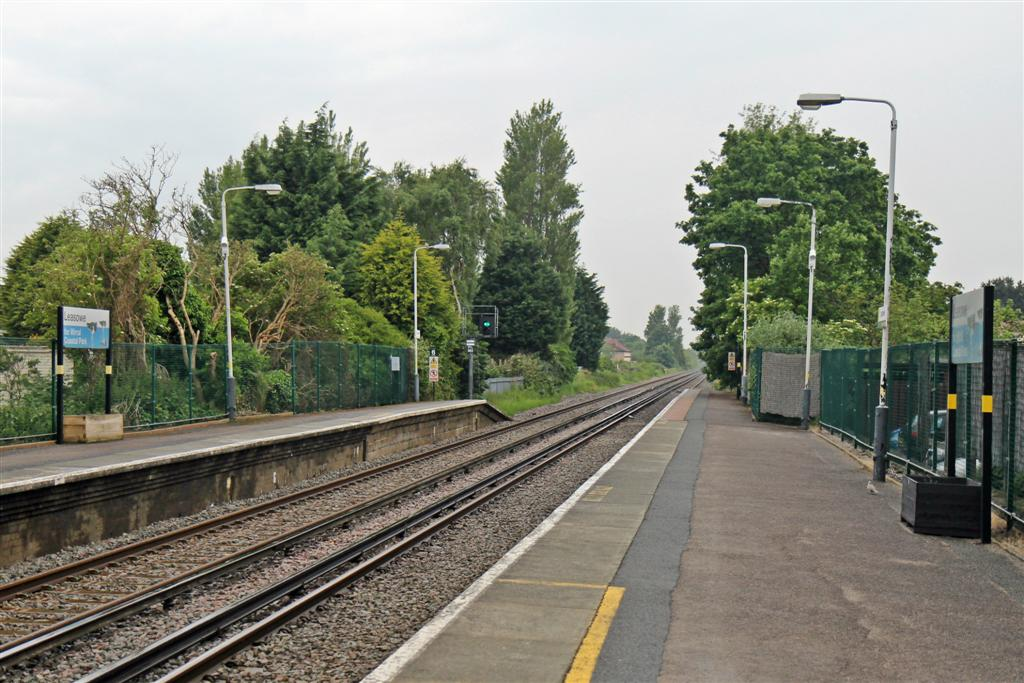
The view towards Moreton.

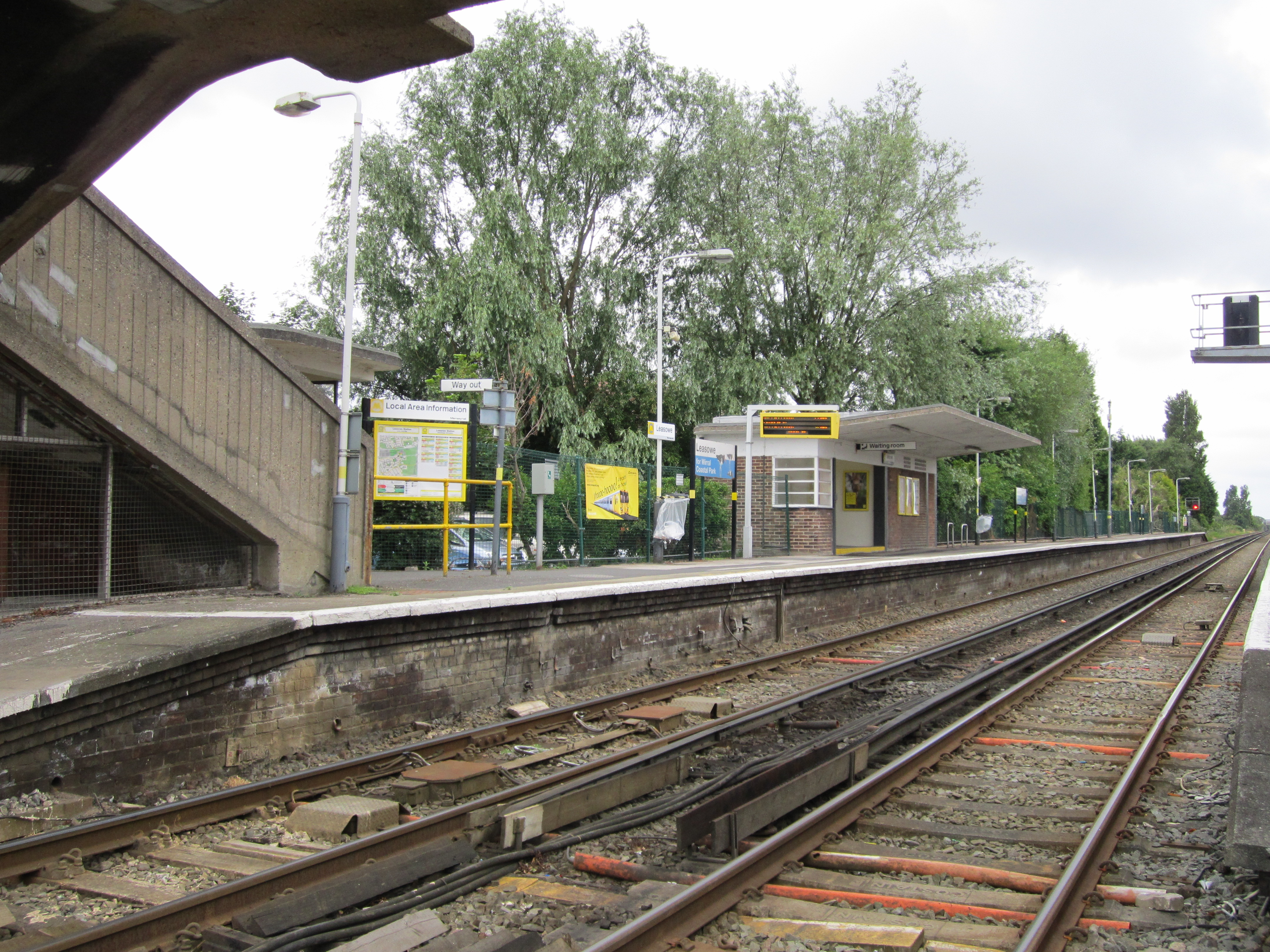
Westward view from under the footbridge, next to the level crossing.

Preceding station	National Rail	Following station
Moreton towards West Kirby	Merseyrail; Wirral Line; West Kirby Branch	Bidston towards Liverpool Central
