= St Ethelwold's Church, Shotton =

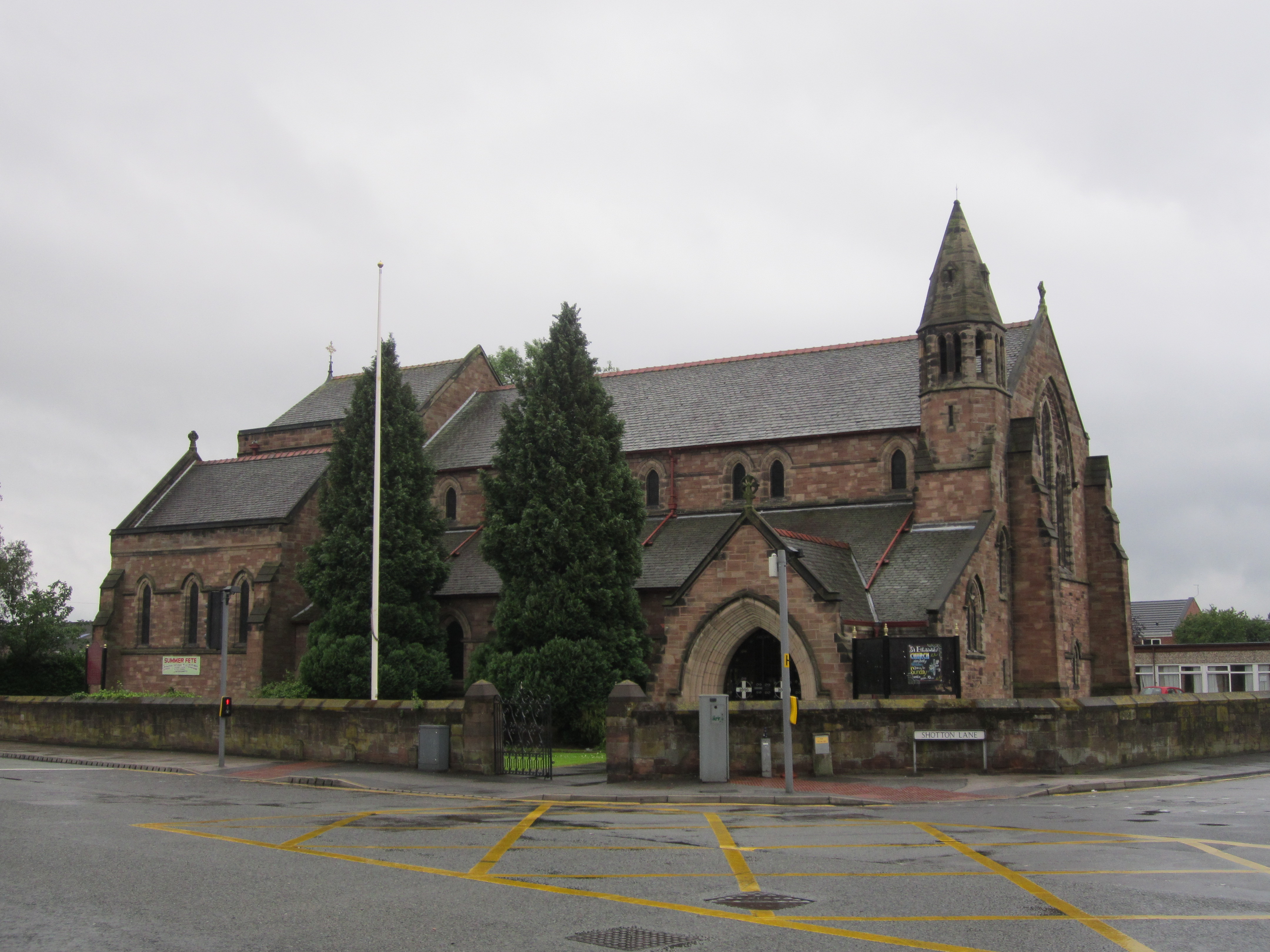
- St Ethelwold's Church, Shotton, Flintshire, Wales.
- St Ethelwold's Church, Shotton
- 53.2096°N 3.0346°W
- OS grid reference: SJ 309 685
- Location: Shotton, Flintshire
- Country: Wales
- Denomination: Anglican
- Churchmanship: Anglo-Catholic

History
- Status: Parish church
- Founder: W. E. Gladstone
- Dedication: St Ethelwold

Architecture
- Functional status: Active
- Heritage designation: Grade II
- Designated: 18 December 1991
- Architect: Douglas and Minshull
- Architectural type: Church
- Style: Gothic Revival
- Groundbreaking: 1898
- Completed: 1902

Specifications
- Materials: Ashlar sandstone

Administration
- Province: Wales
- Diocese: St Asaph
- Archdeaconry: Wrexham
- Deanery: Hawarden

Clergy
- Vicar: Fr Steven Green

St Ethelwold's Church, Shotton, is in the town of Shotton, Flintshire, Wales. It is an active Anglican parish church in the deanery of Hawarden, the archdeaconry of Wrexham, and the diocese of St Asaph It is designated by Cadw as a Grade II listed building.

== History ==
The church building was paid for partly by W. E. Gladstone but construction was not started until after his death; money was collected largely by his son Rev. Stephen Gladstone. It was built between 1898 and 1902 to a design by Douglas and Minshull of Chester in Gothic Revival style. It was intended that the church should have a tower and a spire, but these architectural features were not included at the time. The lower stage of a tower was added in 1924.

The church was dedicated by A. G. Edwards, Bishop of St Asaph, on 8 August 1902.

== Architecture ==
The church is built in sandstone ashlar both externally and internally. It has a clerestory and a chancel with an apse, the chancel being higher than the nave. At the west end are three small lancet windows with stained glass by Edward Reginald Frampton.

== See also ==
- List of new churches by John Douglas
