= Sealand Rifle Range Halt railway station =

Disused railway station in Sealand, Flintshire

Sealand

General information
- Location: Sealand, Flintshire; England
- Coordinates: 53.2468°N 3.0384°W
- Grid reference: SJ308727
- Platforms: 2

Other information
- Status: Disused

History
- Original company: London and North Eastern Railway
- Post-grouping: London and North Eastern Railway

Key dates
- June 1923: Opened
- 14 June 1954: Closed
Location

Sealand Rifle Range Halt railway station served RAF Sealand in Sealand, Flintshire, Wales, from 1923 to 1954 on the Borderlands line.

== History ==
The station was opened in June 1923 by the London and North Eastern Railway. It was situated to the east of the RAF base. It had no other amenities besides platforms. Nothing was timetabled to stop there originally but it was shown in a 1947 timetable, showing that it was for military use only. The station closed on 14 June 1954. Nothing survived by the 1960s.

Preceding station	Historical railways	Following station
Burton Point; Line open, station closed	Borderlands line London and North Eastern Railway	Birkenhead Junction Golf Club Platform; Line open, station closed
