= List of preserved BR Standard Class 9F locomotives =

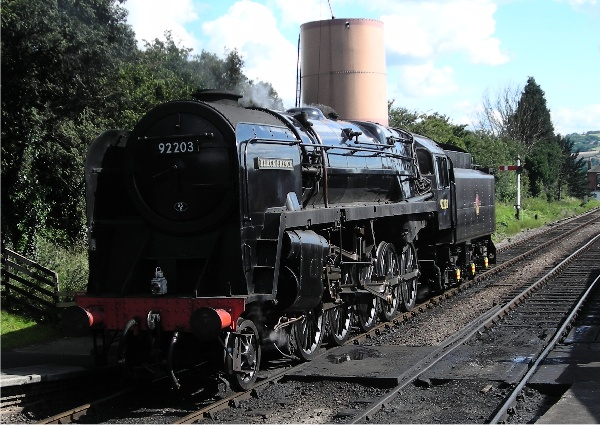
92203 Black Prince on the Gloucestershire Warwickshire Railway on 8 July 2007.

This is a list of BR Standard Class 9F steam locomotives that survive in preservation. Nine 9F locomotives avoided being scrapped at the end of steam traction on British Railways. Seven locomotives were obtained from Woodham Brothers scrapyard in Barry, Vale of Glamorgan, South Wales. The other two were preserved upon withdrawal: 92220 Evening Star—the last steam loco built by BR—joined the National Collection; the artist and conservationist, David Shepherd bought 92203 directly from BR in 1967.

As of 2019, three of the locomotives have not been restored to working order since withdrawal: 92207, 92219 and 92245. All were stored rusting in the open air for 20 or more years and had various parts removed. Most have since received at least some cosmetic restoration to prevent them from deteriorating further. However, the 9F was one of the largest locomotives to run on British railways, and the cost of restoration is high.

92245 needs a great deal of work, is missing many parts, and there have never been serious plans to fully restore it, so it is not expected to be restored anytime in the foreseeable future. At the moment the most likely outcome for 92245 is that it will be dismantled and sectioned in order to be part of an exhibition at Barry that will tell the story of the Woodham Brothers scrapyard.

92207 is dispersed at various locations for parts restoration. It has no tender. 92219 is based at the Wensleydale Railway awaiting restoration.

== 92134 ==
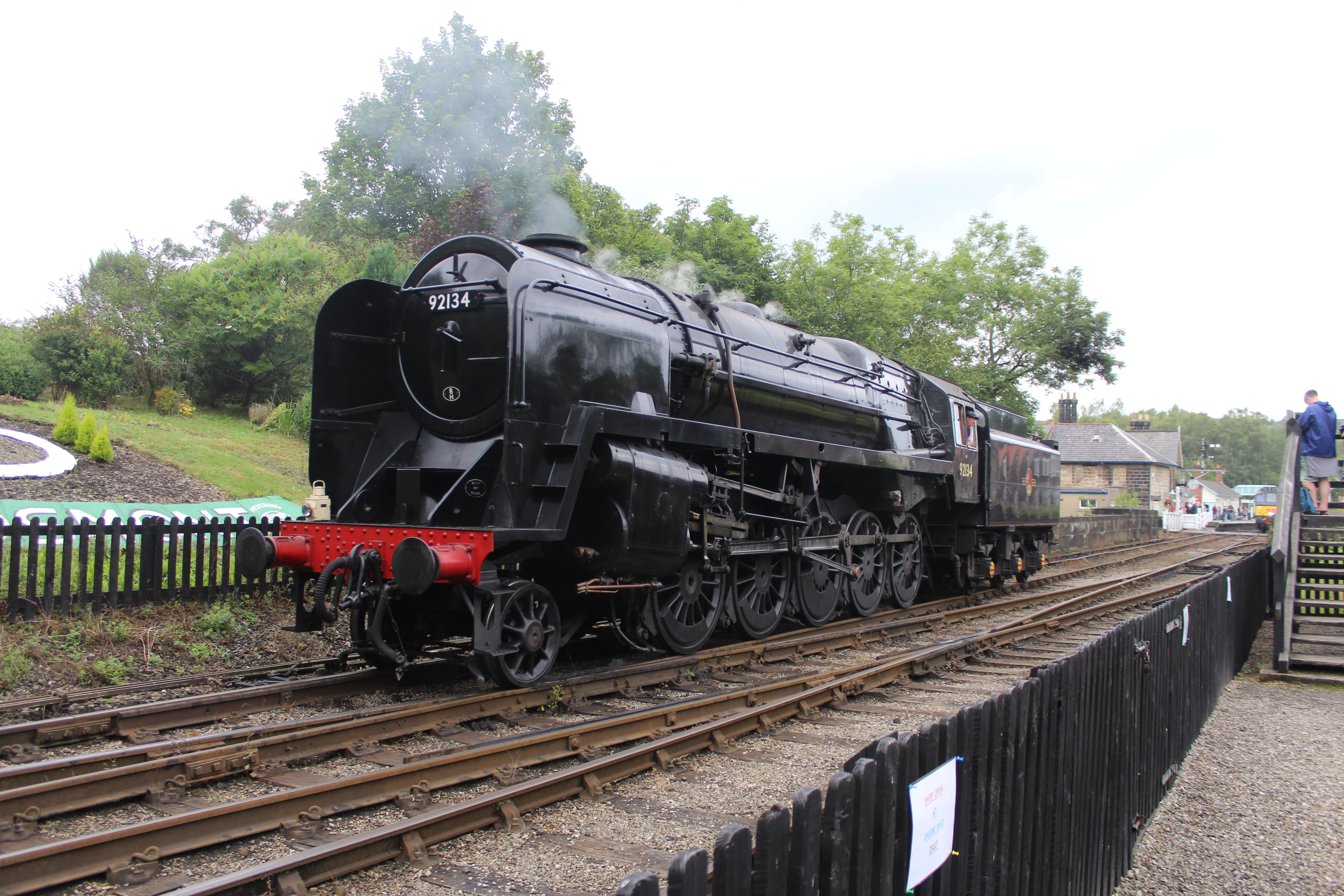
92134 newly restored on the North Yorkshire Moors Railway

92134 was built at Crewe Works in June 1957 and allocated on completion to Saltley (21A). On its withdrawal on 31 December 1966, it was allocated to Birkenhead (6C). It was sold to Woodham Brothers for scrap and moved to their scrapyard at Barry Island in June 1967. Rescued for preservation in December 1980, 92134 became the 116th locomotive to leave Barry after having been there for 13 years and 6 months. Originally it went to Steam & Sail Engineering Ltd at Brightlingsea, in Essex, together with an LMS 4-6-0. It was still there in 1988, fully stripped down, but ownership wrangles led to it being resold again and it then headed to the North Yorkshire Moors Railway. 92134's restoration was mostly carried out by Crewe Heritage Centre in Crewe, but in February 2016, the loco moved to the East Lancashire Railway, before moving again in early 2018 back to the North Yorkshire Moors Railway. In September 2019, the locomotive was steamed for the first time in 53 years.

Following the scrapping of sister 9F 92085 in the summer of 1980, 92134 became the last example of the 9F class to have a single chimney. All of the other preserved 9F's have double chimneys.

In the summer of 2021, 92134 was used to portray a German steam locomotive in the 2023 movie Indiana Jones and the Dial of Destiny.

== 92203 Black Prince ==
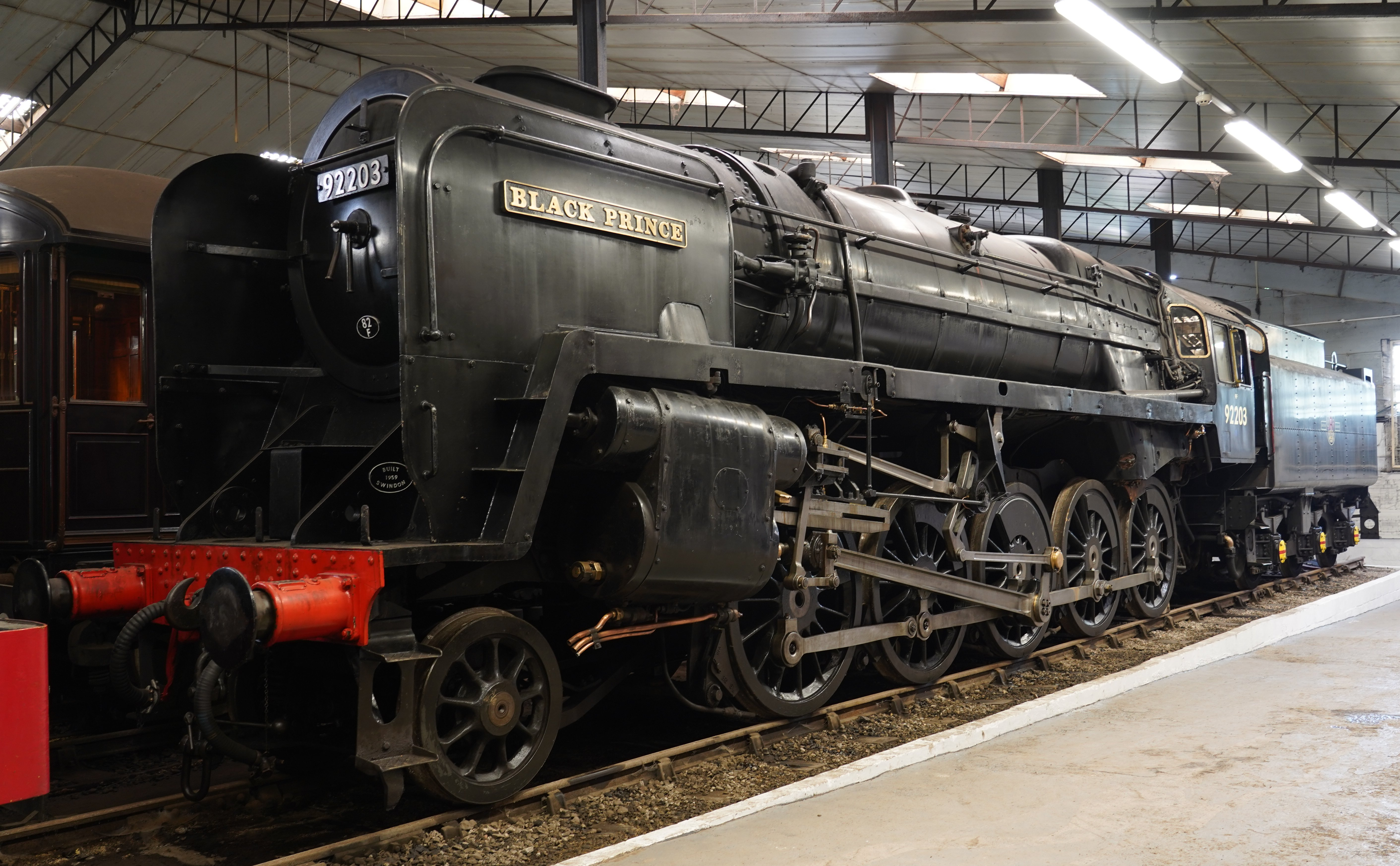
92203 Black Prince at Bressingham Steam and Gardens

No. 92203 was built by Swindon and delivered on 6 April 1959. When withdrawn in November 1967 after a working life of less than nine years, it was working the heavy iron ore trains out of Bidston Dock, Birkenhead to Shotwick Shotton steelworks, and worked the last steam-hauled ore train in November 1967. The locomotive was purchased straight from BR by the artist David Shepherd for £3,000 and moved to the Longmoor Military Railway. He named it Black Prince. On closure of the LMR 92203 moved to Eastleigh Depot, and then in 1973 to the East Somerset Railway, where it was based until 1998.

During this period, 92203 visited several other heritage railways and in September 1982 hauled the heaviest freight train in Britain at 2,198 tonnes, at Foster Yeoman's Tor Works. After being overhauled at the Gloucestershire Warwickshire Railway in 2004, it worked there until 2011. It then moved to the North Norfolk Railway and re-entered service there in 2014 after receiving an overhaul. The NNR purchased it in 2015. Since 2024, the locomotive has been in storage at Bressingham Steam and Gardens.

== 92207 Morning Star ==
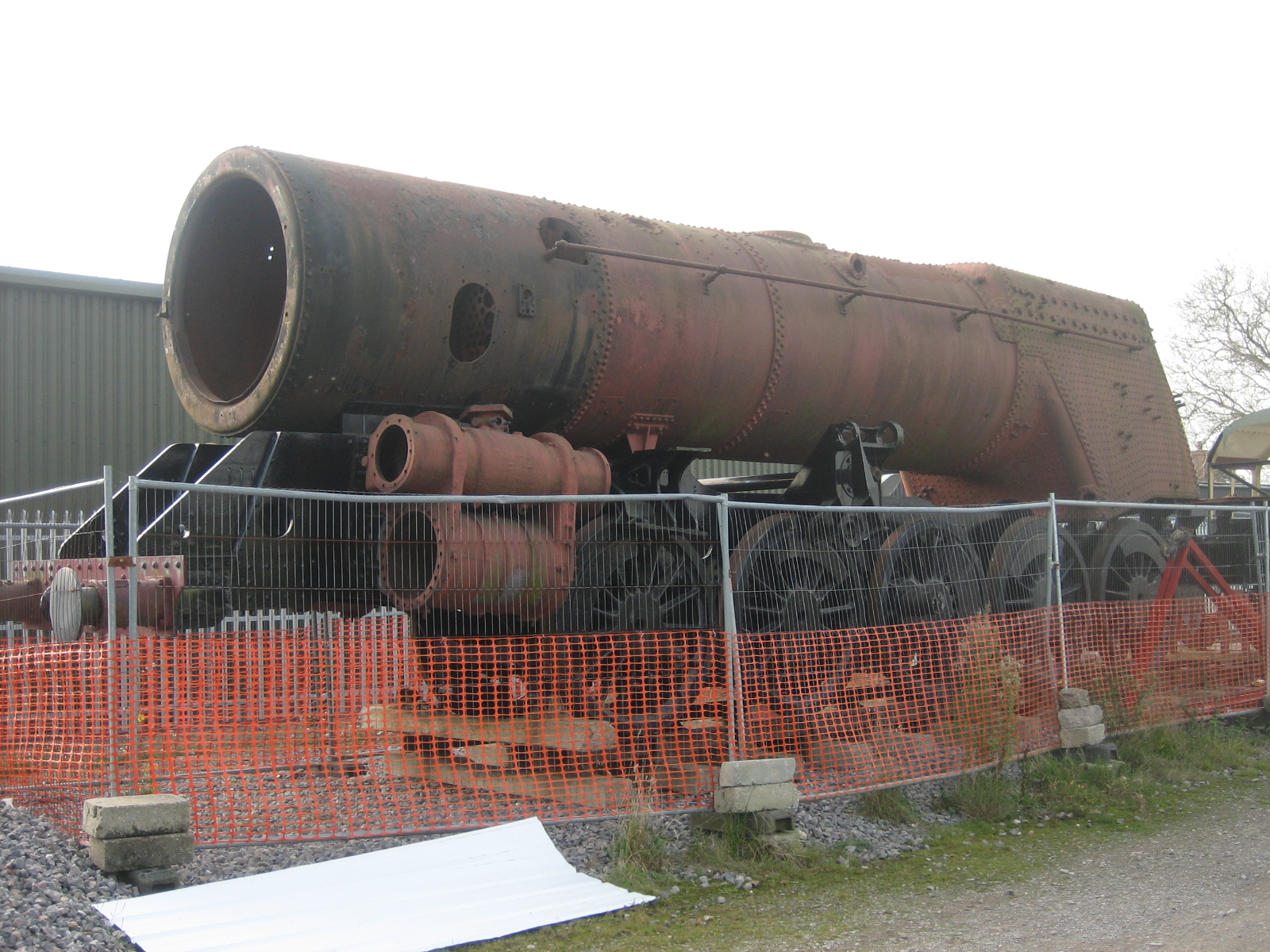
92207 under restoration at Shillingstone since 2005. Formerly at the East Lancs Railway, £100,000 has already been spent on the bottom end and a plethora of parts of all sizes since rescue from Barry in 1986

Built by BR (W) in Swindon "A" Shop during May 1959, 92207 was the 13th-from-last steam locomotive to be built for British Railways. It was part of lot number 429 (the final order for main line steam locomotives by British Rail).

Costing £38,000 to build, including a 5,000-gallon tender, 92207 was completed in May 1959, and despatched to Bristol St Phillips Marsh Depot. Its main duties were heavy iron ore trains from South Wales, but during its stay at Bristol it did make a rare venture to Blackpool on an excursion. In February 1960 it was transferred to Southall for use on fast 'fitted' freight trains, and occasional use on Paddington to Plymouth passenger duties. After a short stay 92207 then moved to Oxford and Banbury sheds where it returned to providing the motive power for heavy iron ore trains from South Wales again. After a brief return to Bristol St Phillips Marsh, 92207 was transferred in November 1964 to its final depot, Newport Ebbw Junction, where it acquired its 86b shed plate (the one it will carry in preservation). 92207 always stayed on the Western Region carrying out a variety of freight and passenger duties. While stabled at Newport it worked Cardiff to Portsmouth duties so would have been seen passing through Salisbury regularly.

While shedded at Southall in 1961, 92207 was involved in a light collision which bent the front end. The main frame just ahead of the cylinders had to be cut and re-welded to straighten the damage and also relieve stress. As the damage was not thought to be too serious the repair work was carried out away from Swindon Works. (During 92207's restoration, when inspected for the first time by the Railway Inspectorate, as part of the requirement of MT276 for main line running, the inspector said he did not like the look of the repair made to the main frame at the front end. He changed his tune slightly when he found out that British Railways had made the repair in March 1961.)

BR decided to scrap 92207 in December 1964 after five years and seven months in service. Woodham Brothers scrap yard in Barry, South Wales bought the locomotive. It arrived as part of a convoy in March 1965 and remained there 21 years and 7 months – four times longer than it was in service with BR – until it became the 180th locomotive to leave the scrap yard, on 21 October 1986 but with no tender. On the day before the move, 92207 was christened Morning Star.

Initially, 92207 was moved to Bury Bolton Street railway station (East Lancashire Railway). During its 19-year stay there around £90,000 was spent on new parts acquisition, forgings and castings and the complete restoration of the main frames, axleboxes and 5 wheelsets to MT276 Mainline standard. On 21 December 2005, the locomotive was relocated to the Shillingstone Railway Project on the former Somerset and Dorset Joint Railway, in Dorset, with a view to complete restoration.

In 2012, 92207 left Shillingstone along with the group recreating an example of the extinct class of BR light pacifics ("Clan class"). Parts for 92207 are currently being restored in various locations. Shillingstone has no decent restoration facility, the two-road workshop (with gantry crane) donated in 2014 by one member was sold at a loss by the present Secretary and all locomotive movements are locked down by the ORR because of failure to implement safety management systems.

In 2022, the S&DRHT announced that they had agreed to purchase 92207 for £150,000. The locomotive is to remain in Poole for the foreseeable future, with the boiler remaining at the East Lancashire Railway for work to be carried out. A replacement tender is currently being built, from the wheel set of a Class 40 locomotive.

== 92212 ==
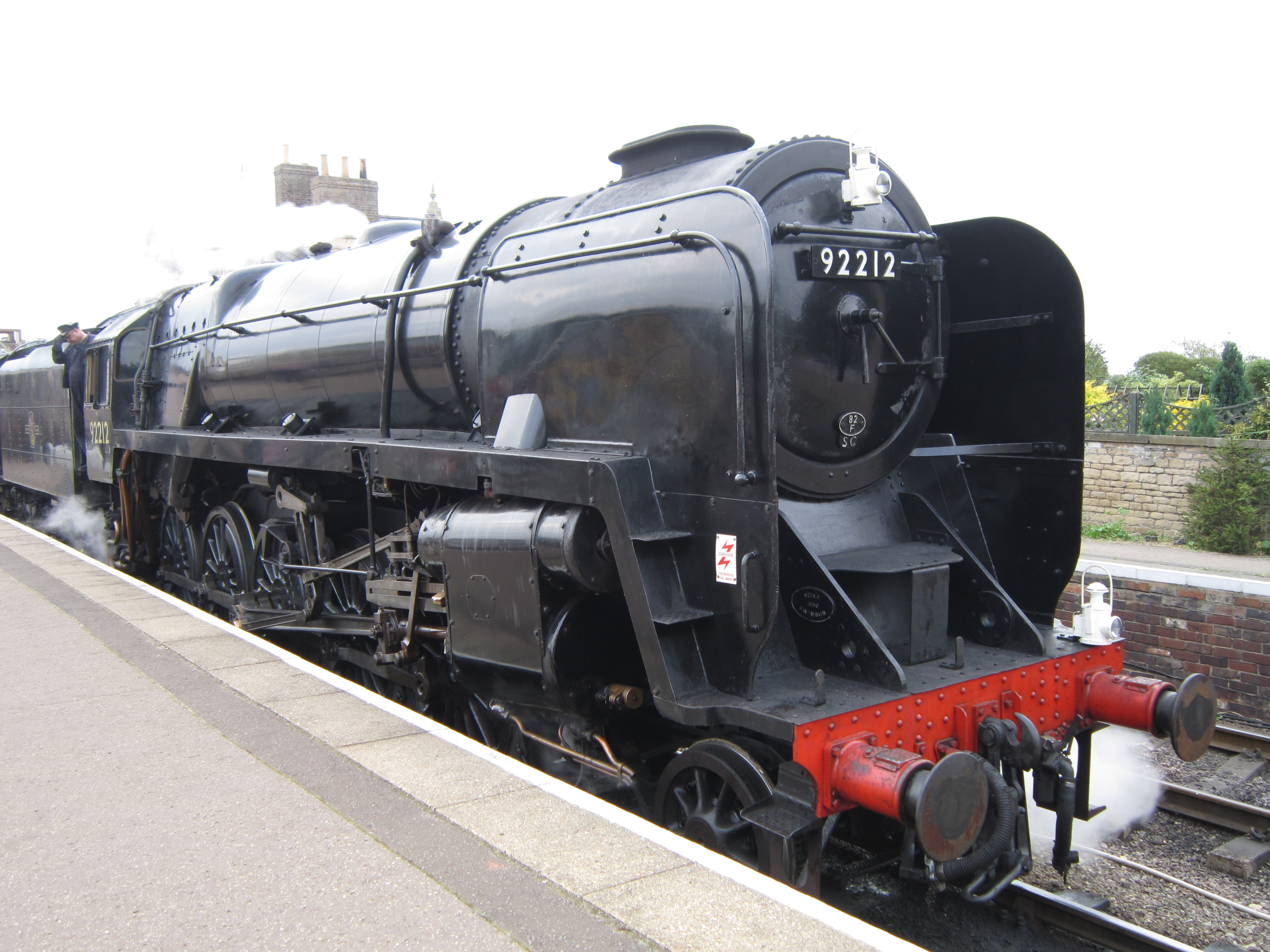
92212 visiting Nene Valley Railway in September 2014

No. 92212 was one of the last 9Fs to be built, being turned out from Swindon in September 1959. First allocated to Banbury, it was transferred in June 1961 to Bath (Green Park) for working over the Somerset and Dorset route to Bournemouth, it was transferred to Ebbw Junction, Newport in September 1961 and then to Tyseley in July 1962. It remained there until November 1966, when it spent its last months at Carnforth. The locomotive was sold to Woodham Brothers scrapyard in Barry, South Wales, where it arrived in January 1968. It was then bought by 92212 Holdings Ltd, and moved to the Great Central Railway at Loughborough in September 1979. Restoration was completed in September 1996, and the engine is based at the Mid-Hants Railway. Following a major overhaul lasting just over two years, in which time it was purchased by Jeremy Hosking, the locomotive returned to operational service on 11 September 2009. 92212 was hired to the Bluebell Railway to provide cover during its current motive power shortage. The locomotive returned to the Mid-Hants Railway in 2013. 92212's boiler certificate has now expired on December 31, 2019 and its final day in service was December 31, 2019, that is New Year's Day. In April 2020 the locomotive was moved to the Llangollen Railway where it will be overhauled.

== 92214 ==
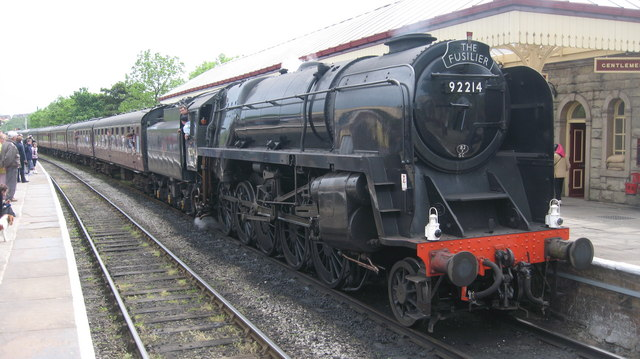
92214 at Ramsbottom Station

Named in 2011 as Cock O' The North by the previous owners, and fully lined out in fictional BR Lined Black livery which the 9F's never carried. It is awaiting overhaul at the Great Central Railway.

On loan to the East Lancashire Railway between 2006 and 2008, it was then bought by the 92214 Locomotive Group (based at the Midland Railway Centre), and fully restored to working order. Like no. 92203, this locomotive was named after being preserved. The name had been carried by three locomotives on the former London and North Eastern Railway (LNER), of classes P2 its rebuilt form as A2/2, and C11. The name was suggested by Valerie Walter, the Company Secretary of the company owning the locomotive (PV Premier Limited), whose grandfather served with the Gordon Highlanders during the First World War (Cock o' the North being the traditional epithet attached to the Chief of the Gordon Clan of Scotland), with no prior knowledge that the name had been used by the LNER for some of their locomotives.

A ten-year boiler overhaul was completed over 2012/13, and on 29 June 2013 it gained a full ten year boiler ticket. After arriving at the GCR earlier that month, on 27 January 2014 it was announced that 92214 had been personally bought by the GCR chairman, and was to remain there.

92214 appeared at the GCR gala in 'weathered' plain BR black livery, and the 'Cock O' The North' name was removed. 92214 was subsequently repainted into lined BR Brunswick Green as carried by sister loco 92220 'Evening Star'. 92214 was temporarily renamed Central Star before being again renamed Leicester City after the football team won the 2015-16 Premier League.

In August 2015, 92214 was briefly named Cromwell.

In 2023, 92214 was acquired by the David Clarke Railway Trust, to become a permanent member of the GCR fleet. The locomotive has been repainted in authentic BR unlined black with nameplates removed.

== 92219 ==
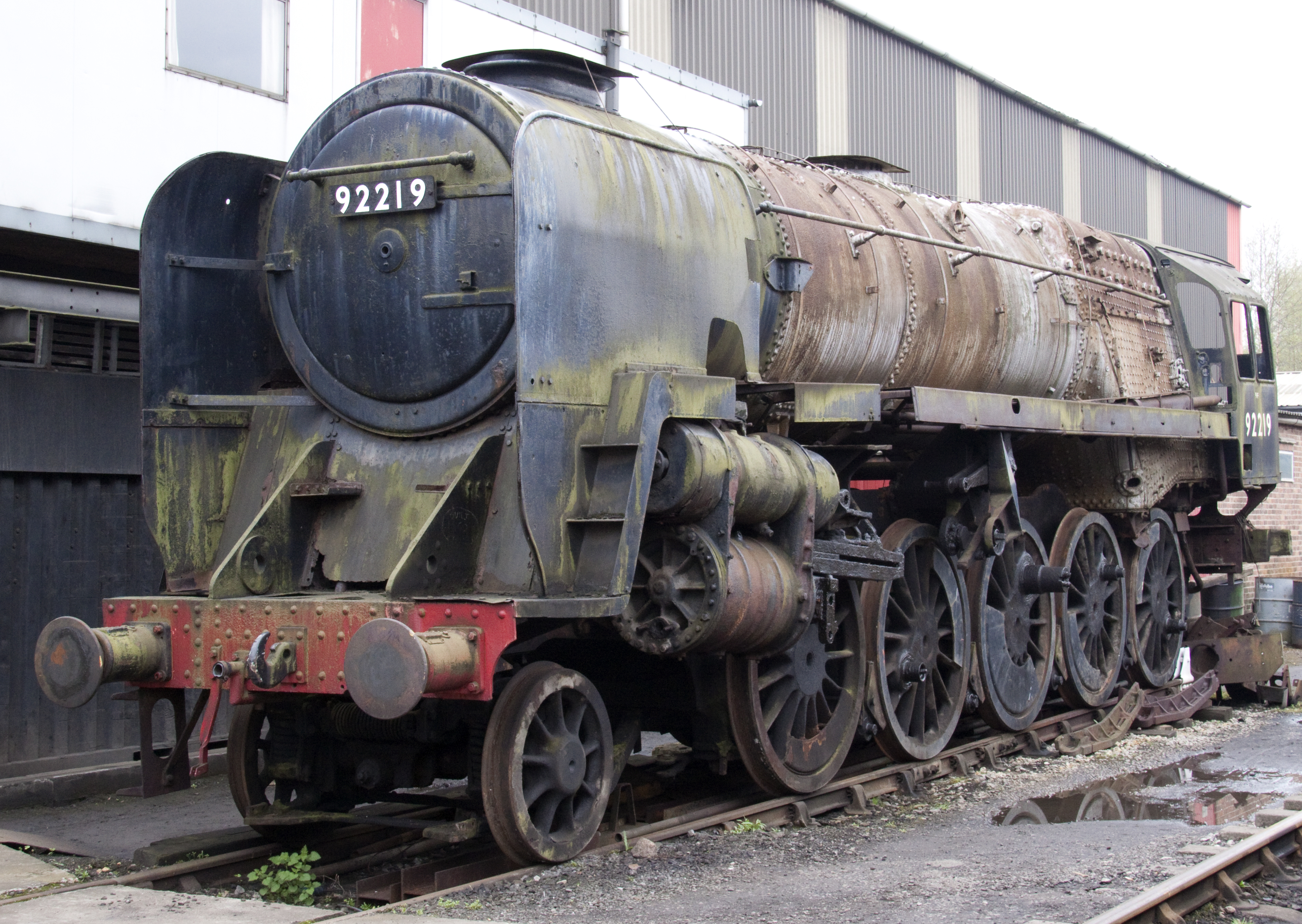
92219 at the Midland Railway

Built at Swindon Works in 1959, 92219 entered service on 31 January 1960 and was allocated to St. Philips Marsh shed (82B). Withdrawn on 30 September 1965, it had by this time been reallocated to Cardiff East Dock shed (88B). 92219 was sold to Woodham Bros for scrap and was moved to their scrapyard at Barry in October 1965. The locomotive was purchased for preservation minus its tender by the same group who purchased and restored 92214 and moved to Buxton Peak Rail in May 1985 after 19 years 7 months. It was then moved at the same time as the then partially restored 92214 to the Midland Railway - Butterley. It was the 163rd locomotive to leave Barry.

The locomotive received some cosmetic attention on arriving at Butterley in 1989. However, due to the lack of many significant components such as the connecting rods, motion, and the tender, the locomotive remained largely in ex-Barry condition, stored in the open air at Swanwick Junction, adjacent to the Exhibition Hall.

In October 2012 the locomotive was purchased by Graham and Phil Harris, and moved to Kirkby Stephen East. Volunteers at the Stainmore Railway Company's site hoped to restore it, but following a disagreement between the owners and Stainmore Railway Company 92219 moved with some other rolling stock to the Wensleydale Railway in April 2014 where the locomotive has got a long lasting future.

In December 2020, 92219 moved to a private site in Cumbria, before being moved to the Strathspey Railway.

== 92220 Evening Star ==
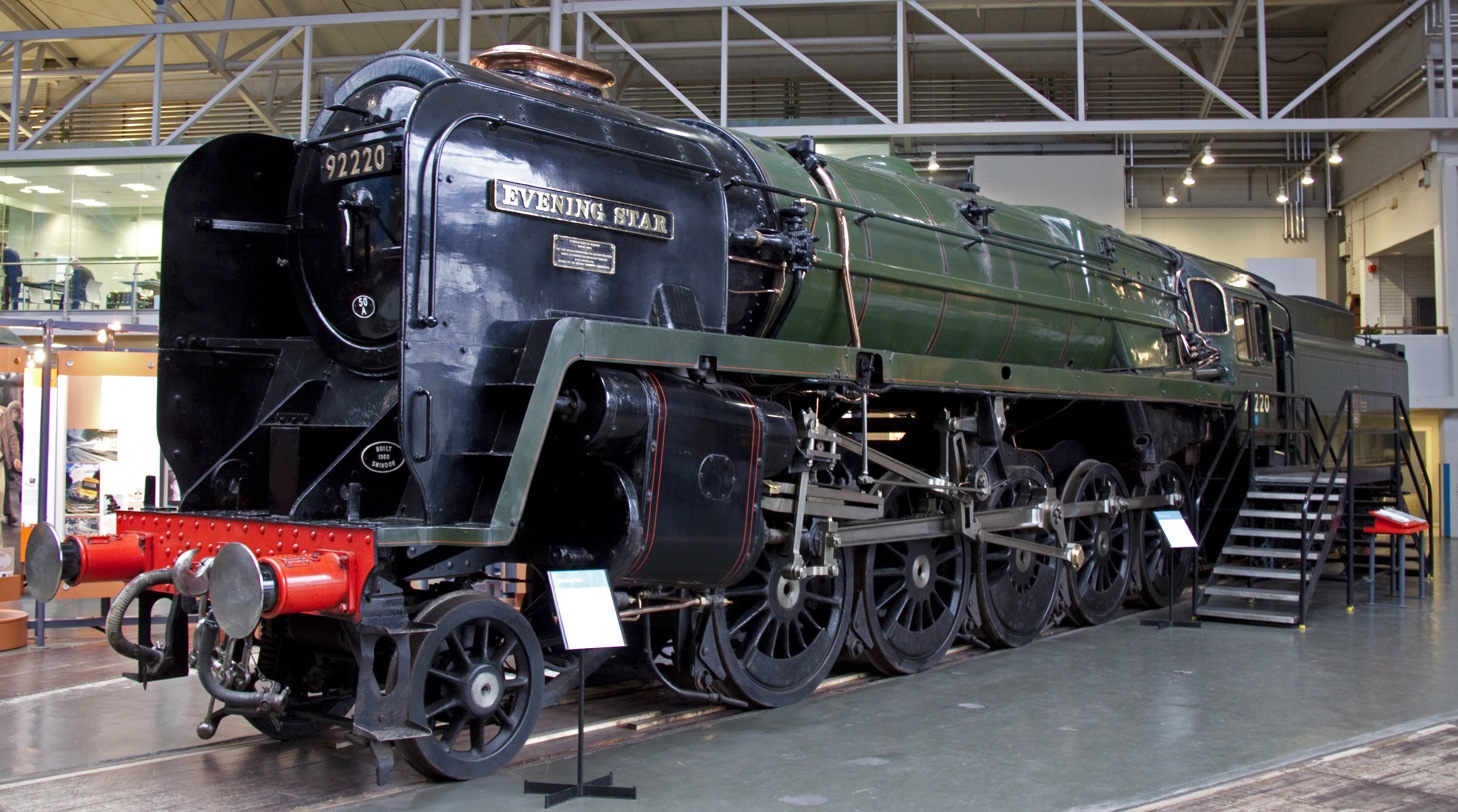
The Evening Star at the National Railway Museum, York.

92220 Evening Star was the last steam locomotive built by British Rail, being built in March 1960 and has for many years been a static exhibit at the National Railway Museum in York, where it resides today.

After being displayed at the "Locomotion" museum at Shildon, County Durham, the engine returned to its birthplace, Swindon Works, on 3 September 2008. Evening Star was exhibited for two years at the Swindon 'Steam' Railway Museum, swapping places with the GWR locomotive King George V. The locomotive has now returned to York.

== 92240 ==
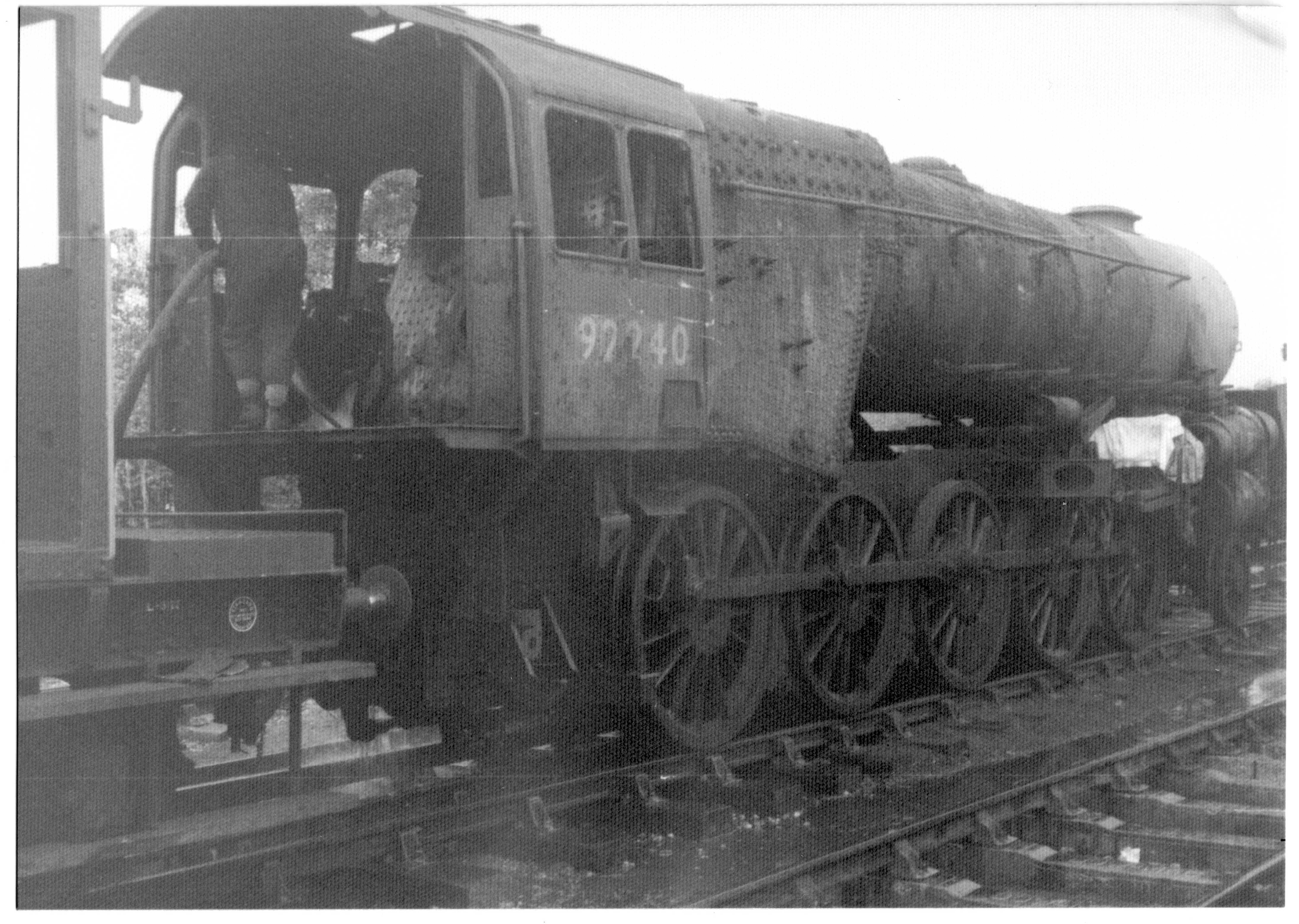
92240 at Woodhams', Barry, 1970's

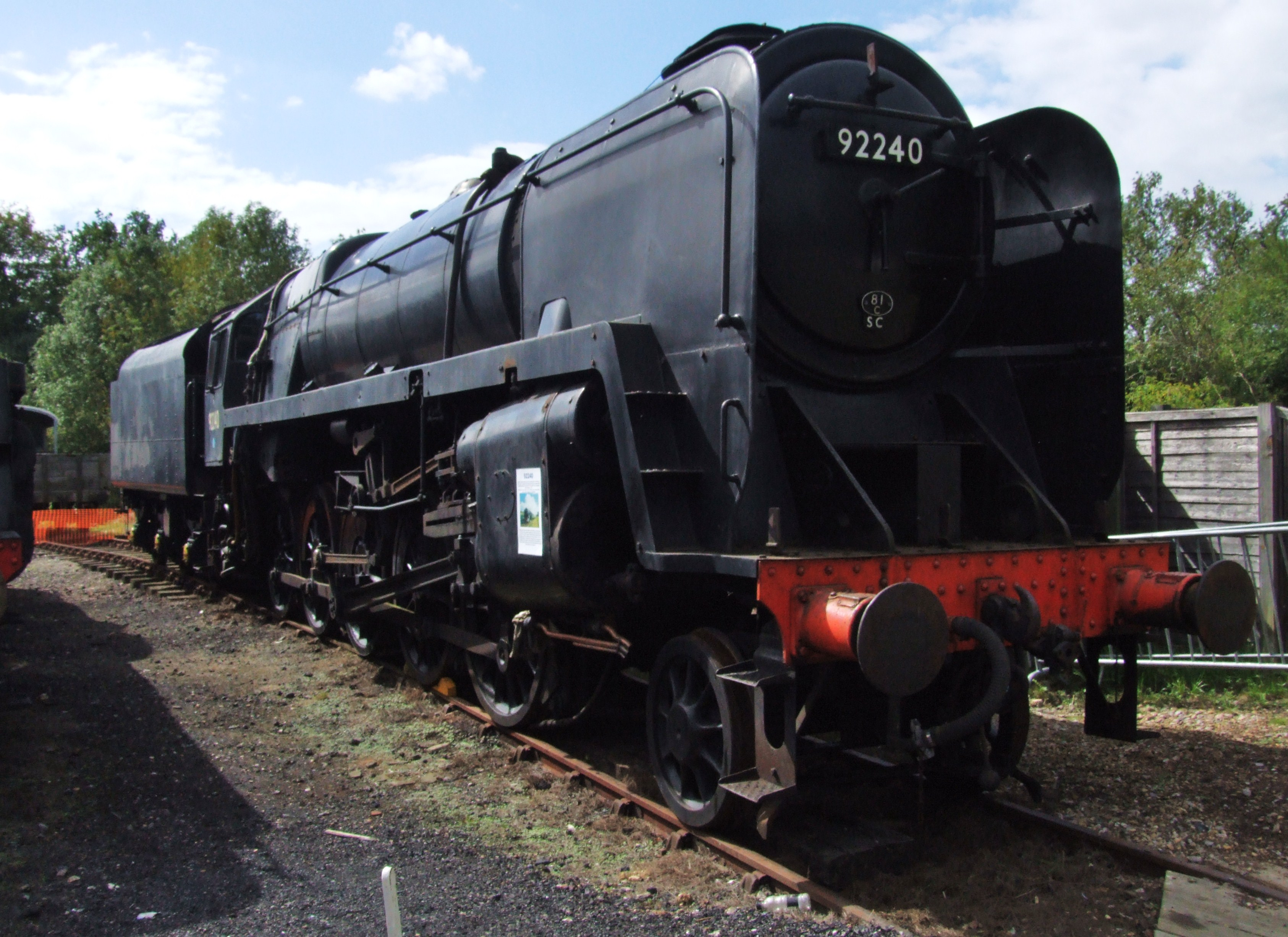
92240 at the Bluebell railway

This locomotive was among the last steam locomotives to be completed at Crewe Works, finished in October 1958 with a double chimney and a BR1G tender according to Western Region preference. Allocated over its life to Newport (86A) in 1958, Old Oak Common (81A) from late 1958-1960 and Southall (81C) from 1960 to 1965. It was withdrawn in September 1965 and sold to Barry Scrapyard. The locomotive remained at Barry until it was bought by a consortium of members of the Bluebell Railway's locomotive department in 1978. The restoration of 92240 at the Bluebell Railway was one of the first to involve the construction of a new tender from a redundant underframe and a new tender body. Much of the restoration was financed through the recycling of old newspapers donated by the public.

Re-entering traffic in 1990 as the first restored Barry 9F, it ran only a few years before several boiler stays were found to need replacement. It was at this point that the boiler was re-certified for a further ten years. It was withdrawn from service in 2002 due to the poor condition of the tubes. After many years awaiting overhaul on public view in the locomotive shed at Sheffield Park, it moved in September 2009 with cousin 4MT No 75027 to be on static display at platform 1 at Horsted Keynes. 92240 is now on static display at Sheffield park in preparation for overhaul.

== 92245 ==
One of the Barry Ten, the last ten locomotives to leave Woodham Brothers scrapyard in Barry, South Wales. Owned by the Vale of Glamorgan Council, it is stored 'unrestored' at Barry Depot on the Barry Island Railway. It has been confirmed that the loco is to be dismantled and sectioned in the future as part of an exhibition at Barry that will tell the story of the Woodham Brothers scrapyard. However, the boiler will not be used for the exhibition, and as a result, has moved to Peak Rail for future restoration.
