= Wrexham Central railway station =

Railway station in Wrexham, North Wales

Wrexham Central Welsh: Wrecsam Canolog
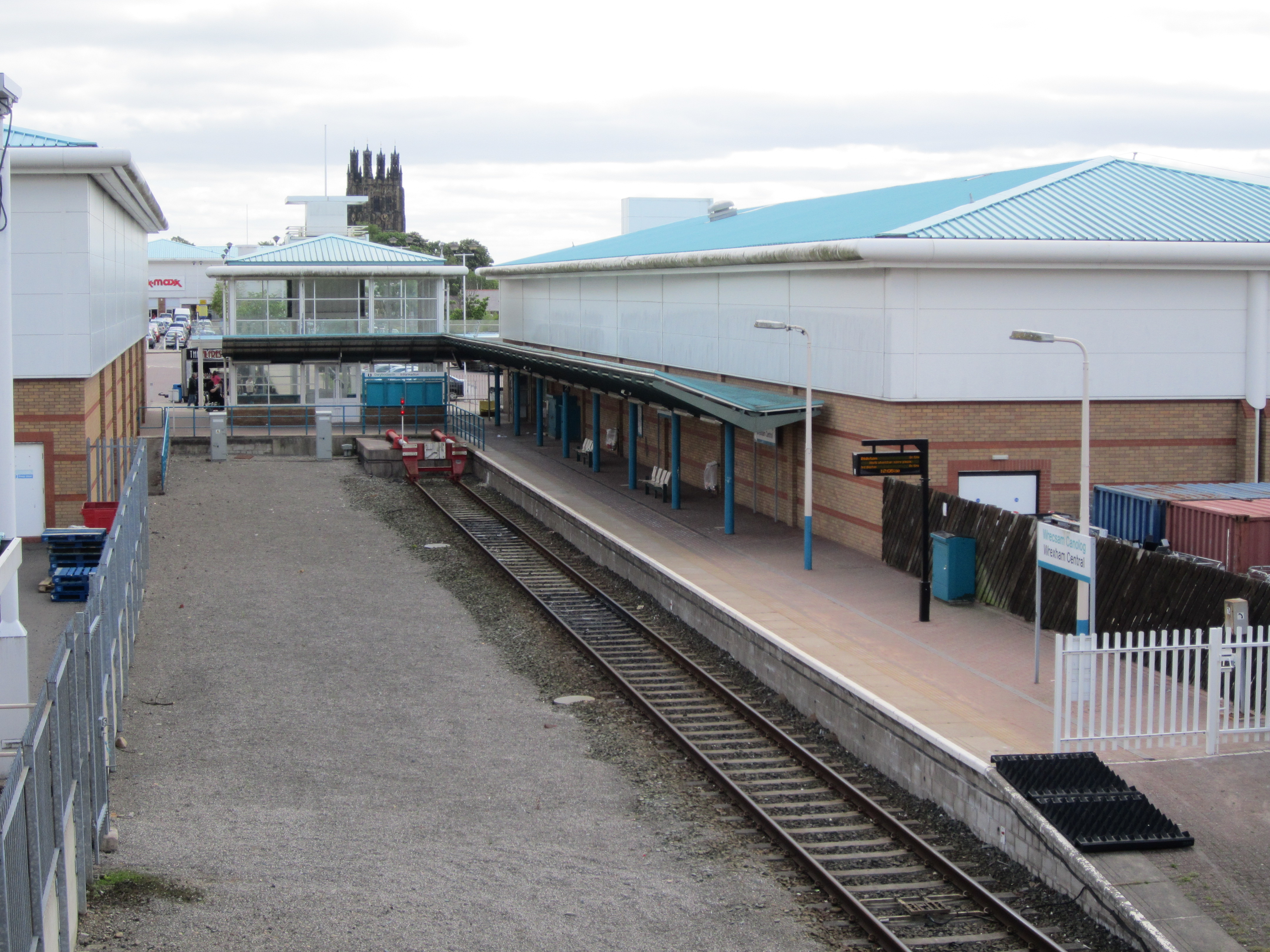

General information
- Location: Wrexham, Wrexham; Wales
- Coordinates: 53.0462°N 2.9994°W
- Grid reference: SJ333502
- Manager: Transport for Wales
- Platforms: 1

Other information
- Station code: WXC
- Classification: DfT category F1

History
- Original company: Wrexham, Mold and Connah's Quay Railway
- Pre-grouping: Great Central Railway
- Post-grouping: London and North Eastern Railway

Key dates
- 1 November 1887: Original station opened
- 2 November 1895: Route to Ellesmere opened
- 10 September 1962: Route to Ellesmere closed
- 23 November 1998: Station resited

Passengers
- 2021/22: ▲13,194
- 2022/23: ▲41,806
- 2023/24: ▲42,268
- 2024/25: ▲63,048
- 2025/26: ▲72,596
Location
Notes
- Passenger statistics from the Office of Rail and Road

Wrexham Central railway station (Welsh: Wrecsam Canolog) is the smaller of two railway stations serving the central area of Wrexham in Wales, the other being Wrexham General. The platform can accommodate a three car diesel train, but has room for platform extension. It is the southern terminus of the Borderlands Line, also known as the Wrexham-Bidston line, which links north-east Wales to Merseyside.

The current station was constructed in 1998 within a retail park in Wrexham city centre known as Island Green. It replaced the first Central station, opened on 1 November 1887, which was a larger station located around 275 yards (250 metres) to the east. The older station closed on 23 November 1998 and the site was cleared as part of the retail development.

== History ==
=== The original station ===
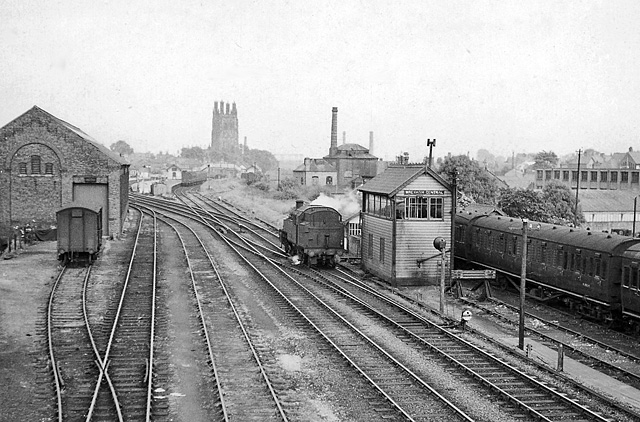
View SE towards Station in 1959

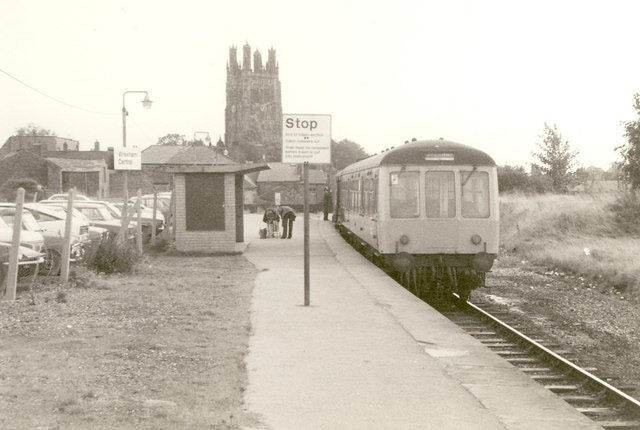
Wrexham Central railway station in 1977

The Wrexham, Mold and Connah's Quay Railway (WMCQ) had opened between Wrexham Exchange and Buckley (old station) on 1 May 1866. A southern extension to a station better situated for the centre of Wrexham was authorised on 18 August 1882; work did not begin until January 1887, and it was opened on 1 November the same year. Wrexham Central was a large station, with a marshalling yard and goods depot accompanying it. The station clock was provided and maintained free of charge by a local watchmaker named Pierce. It was a terminus for several years until the Wrexham and Ellesmere Railway (W&ER) was opened on 2 November 1895. The W&ER was built with financial assistance of the WMCQ and the Cambrian Railways, and operated by the latter, which it joined at Ellesmere.

The line of the former W&ER was closed to passengers on 10 September 1962, and Wrexham Central almost met a similar fate (it was listed for closure in the Beeching Report of 1963). As Wrexham was undergoing population growth at the time and protests against the proposal were widespread, it was decided to retain it due to being conveniently close to the city centre. The station became unstaffed from 7 February 1972 and it was reduced to a single track station in August 1973, with a small concrete shelter and an adjacent stabling siding. Part of the old W&ER remained in use for freight as far as Abenbury Sidings until final closure in May 1981.

=== Freight and goods ===
The goods depot and marshalling yard were used until 7 December 1964, after which they were reduced to a large car park and railway club. The station and goods yard had a 56-lever signal box, which was used until 19 August 1973.

=== The present station ===
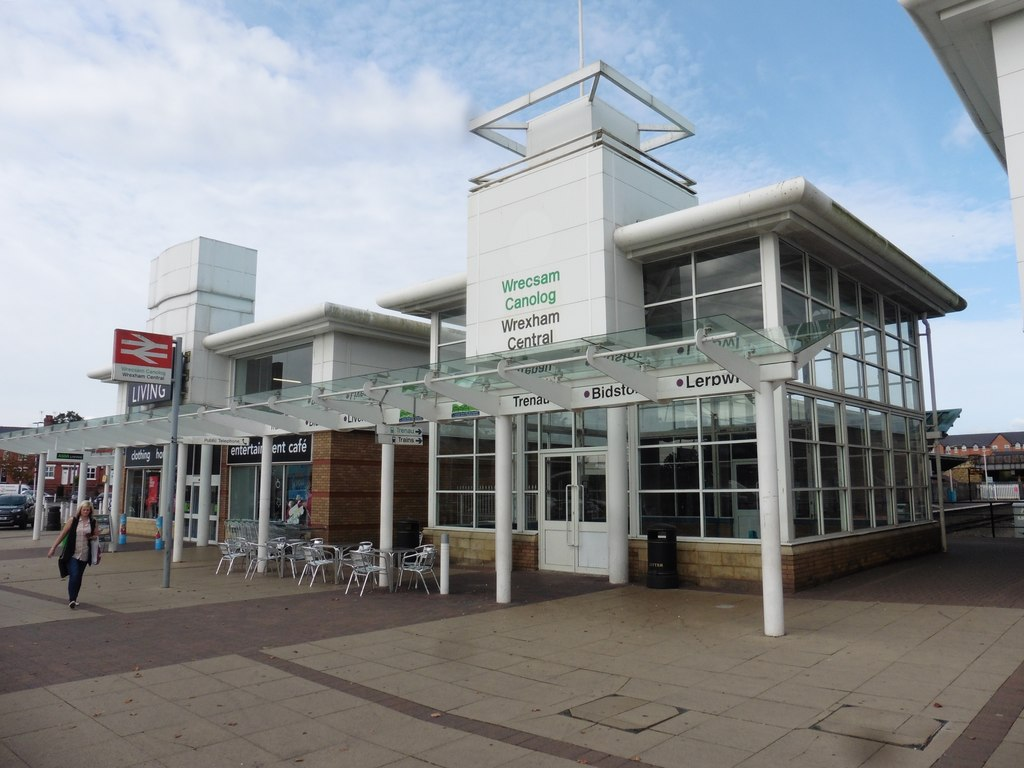
Station concourse (2017)

In 1998, a large shopping centre was to be built on the entire area, and the station was moved west by 400 yards (370 metres). The local rail users group tried to prevent this, but failed. They did however get a large station building constructed, compared to the prefabricated open concrete shelter it replaced, and the new station was opened on 23 November 1998. One of the conditions the Rail Users group gave on the relocation was that if needed, space be left for future doubling of the track and a second platform, which was complied with.

There are possibilities that Wrexham Central may become electrified, as part of electrification of the entire Borderlands line. Network Rail mentioned this as a possible future development for the route in its 2007 Business Plan for the area, but further progress is dependent on a favourable business case being put forward and funding secured.

The station is unstaffed and the main building is no longer in use. However a self-service ticket machine is available on the platform, asking with a self-help point, electronic departure displays and automated PA system. The station adjoins a pay-and-display car park within the Island Green Retail Park, however three free spaces are provided for railway passengers.

At privatisation, the station became managed by North Western Trains, later known as First North Western. A review in 2003 led to the station being briefly operated by Wales & Borders, before Arriva Trains Wales from late 2003, and Transport for Wales from 2018.

== Services ==
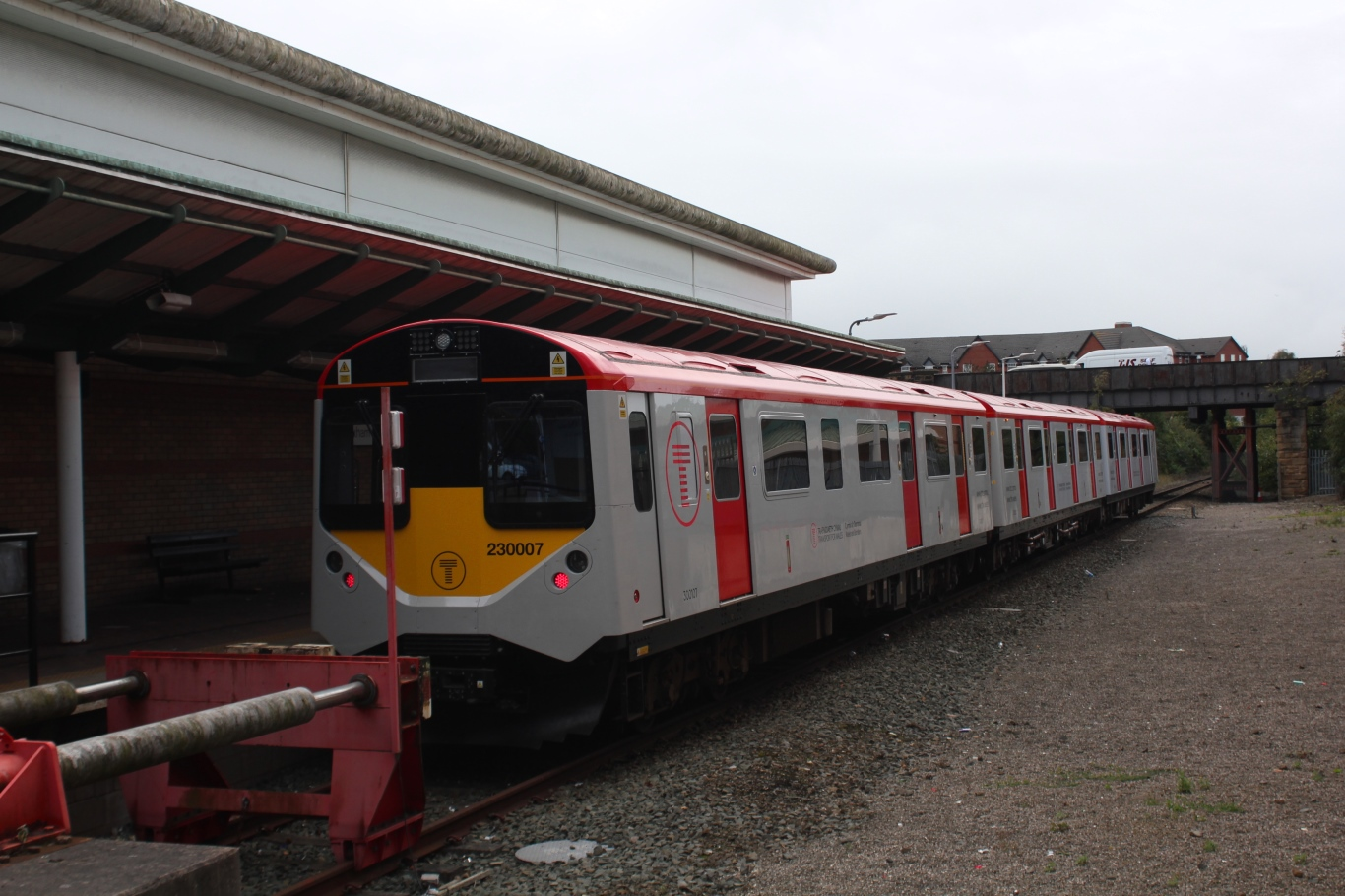
A Transport for Wales Class 230 waits at the station before returning to Bidston.

The station has an hourly service to Shotton and Bidston on Monday to Saturday daytimes, dropping to two-hourly in the evenings and on Sundays and bank holidays. From December 2021, it was expected the service would improve to two trains per hour using Class 230 fully refurbished metro trains with battery assistance (hybrid).

Alighting at Bidston allows for connections to the Merseyrail Wirral line, with westbound services to West Kirby and eastbound services to Liverpool via Birkenhead, both quarter-hourly during the day and half-hourly during the evenings and early mornings.

Preceding station	National Rail	Following station
Wrexham General	Transport for Wales; Borderlands Line	Terminus
	Disused railways	
Terminus	Cambrian Railways; Wrexham and Ellesmere Railway	Hightown Halt; Line and station closed
