= John Summers & Sons =

UK business

Coordinates: 53.21697°N 3.0308°W

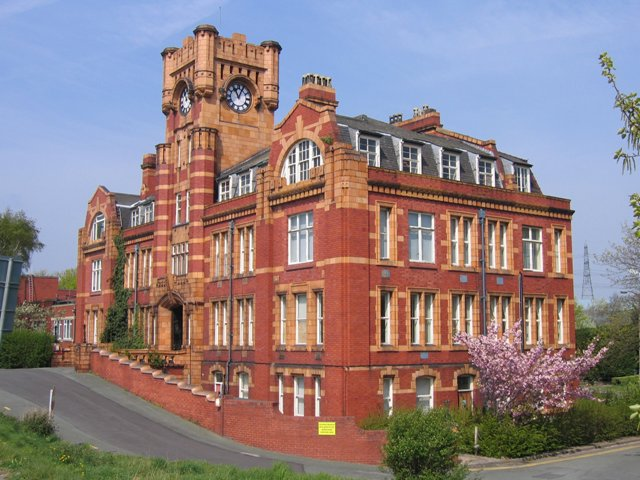
John Summers Building, Shotton

John Summers & Sons Ltd was a major United Kingdom iron and steel producer, latterly based on the Dee Estuary at Shotton, Flintshire. The company was absorbed into British Steel Corporation in 1967; British Steel became Corus in 1999 and this company was taken over by Tata Steel in 2007.

== Early life ==
The founder, John Summers, was born in Bolton, Lancashire in 1822. While working as a clogger, he visited the Great Exhibition in 1851, where he bought a nail making machine, and commenced making nails with which to fasten the iron strips on to the soles of clogs. In 1852, Summers moved into Sandy Bank Iron Forge at Stalybridge, where he successfully concentrated on the production of clog irons and nails. He then purchased land near the forge, and built a new ironworks, known as the Globe Works.

== The Business ==
John Summers died on 10 April 1876, at the age of 54. Three of his sons, James, John and Alfred, carried on the business, and they were joined by another brother, Henry Hall Summers in 1869. Space for expansion at the Globe Works having been exhausted, the firm opened the Hawarden Bridge Steelworks at Shotton in 1896.

In 1898 the firm became a Private Limited Company and in 1908, on completion of new offices, the headquarters were transferred to Shotton. By 1909 the company was the largest manufacturer of galvanized steel in the country, and probably the largest manufacturer of steel nail strips and sheets.

In 1919 the Wolverhampton Corrugated Iron Company at Ellesmere Port was taken over. John Summers & Sons also bought the Castle Fire Brick company in Buckley and the next year took over the Shelton Iron, Steel & Coal Co, Stoke-on-Trent. This company was Shotton's supplier of pig iron, a very scarce item at the time and this acquisition meant that the company had become very largely self-contained and self-sufficient.

William Arthur Robotham of Rolls-Royce recalled the two Summers brothers in the 1920s, both knowledgeable engineers; Geoffrey and Dick (who went to Shrewsbury School with Robotham's brother, and finally took over from his father John as head of the firm). As John was immensely wealthy the two brothers could afford to run Rolls-Royce cars, though in their early twenties.

John Summers & Sons Ltd was nationalised in 1951, becoming part of the Iron and Steel Corporation of Great Britain, was denationalised shortly afterwards, and renationalised in 1967.

The former HQ building at Shotton has been named by the Victorian Society as a heritage building at risk of disrepair.

== Sources ==
- Whitaker's Almanack (various dates)
