= Shotton, Flintshire =

Town in Flintshire, Wales

Shotton
- Town and community
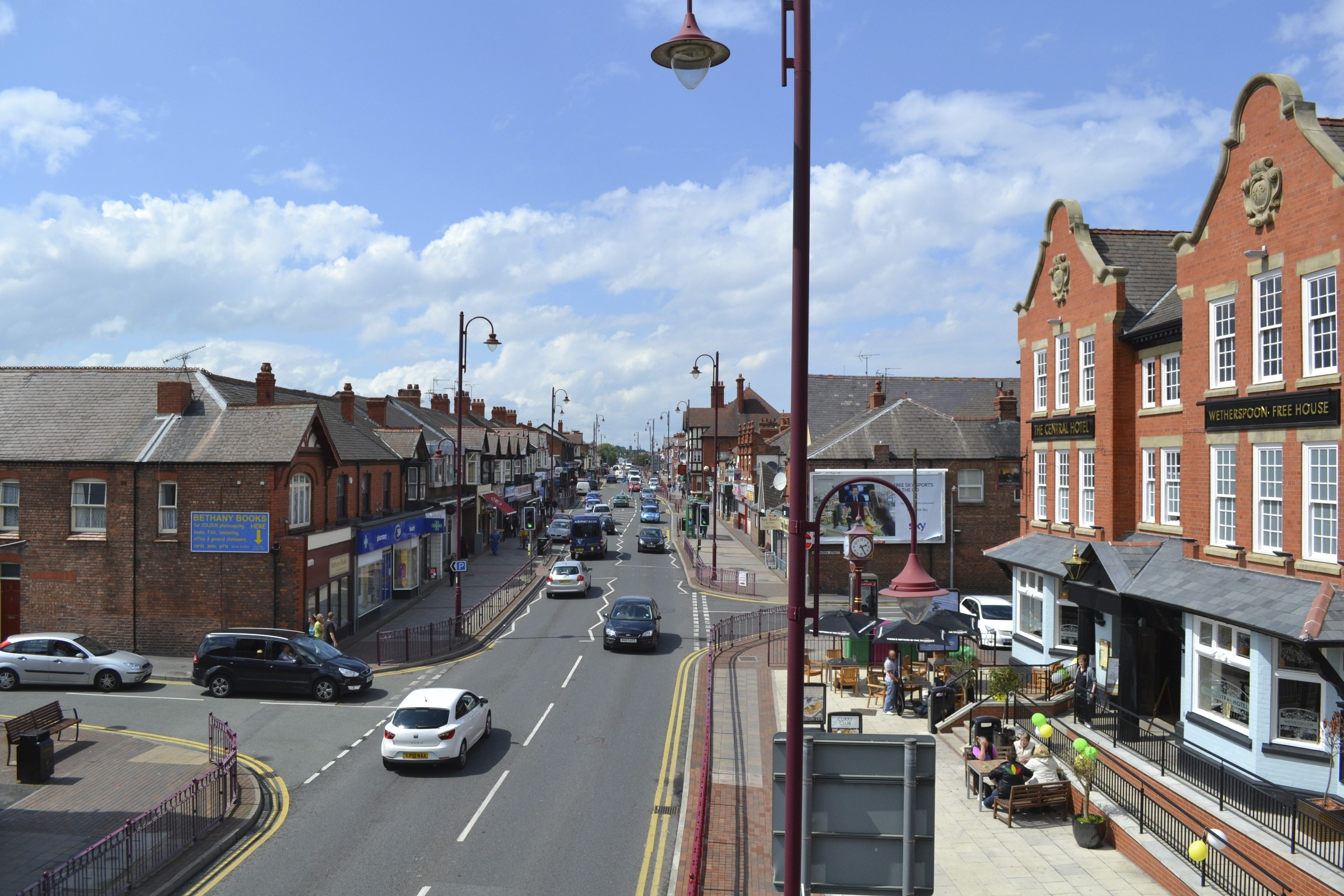
- A view from the railway bridge, showing Chester Road

- Location within Flintshire
- Population: 6,663 (2011 census)
- OS grid reference: SJ305685
- Principal area: Flintshire
- Preserved county: Clwyd
- Country: Wales
- Sovereign state: United Kingdom
- Post town: DEESIDE
- Postcode district: CH5
- Dialling code: 01244
- Police: North Wales
- Fire: North Wales
- Ambulance: Welsh
- UK Parliament: Alyn and Deeside
- Senedd Cymru – Welsh Parliament: Alyn and Deeside
- Website: Town council website
- List of places UK Wales Flintshire 53.209°N 3.042°W Map of the community

Shotton is a town and community in Flintshire, Wales, within the Deeside conurbation along the River Dee, joined with Connah's Quay, near the border with England. It is located 5 miles (8 km) west of Chester and can be reached by road from the A548. In the 2011 census, Shotton had a population of 6,663.

== Etymologies ==
The town's name is first recorded in Old English as Cyllingas. This name derives from the Welsh language word Celyn (meaning Holly) and has persisted in one form or another throughout the town's history. By 1822, Richard Willett recorded the name as Kyllins, which he says contains "one of the parish's most notable ancient houses". Even today, Killin's Farm and Killin's Lane may still be found in the oldest part of town.

The town's modern English name is shared with three other towns in Britain. These towns (all on the English side of the Scottish border) derive their names from Town of Scots but it is unlikely that a Flintshire town shares this etymology. The name probably derives from Scēot-tūn = "farmstead on or near a steep slope", or from Shot-tūn = "farmstead in a clearing in the wood". The town is officially named Shotton in both English and Welsh, making it one of the few towns in Wales to officially have neither a recognised Welsh spelling or Welsh etymology.

== History ==
The town grew from the 18th century around coal mining and farming on reclaimed marshland. Shotton also became a railway junction. The John Summers & Sons steelworks was established in 1896 on a six-acre site. At its peak it employed over 13,000. Following nationalisation in 1967, the works became part of the British Steel Corporation. Although it is known as Shotton Steel Works, the large plant (owned by Tata Steel since 2006) is across the river from Shotton, with most being in the community of Connah's Quay.

The town lies next to the Hawarden Bridge, which was completed in 1889 as a swing-opening bridge. The opening mechanism was disabled in 1960.

== Demography ==
Shotton has an area of 2.34 km^{2}, with a density of 3,001 km^{2}. The population is roughly 50% male and female and 62.2% are between the ages of 18 and 64.

The community consists of three electoral wards of the Flintshire County Council local authority:

Ward	2001 census	2011 census
Shotton East	1,803	1,958
Shotton Higher	2,529	2,576
Shotton West	1,933	2,129
Shotton Total	6,265	6,663

== Education ==
Shotton is served by the following schools:

- Connah's Quay High School (English-medium secondary)
- Hawarden High School (English-medium secondary)
- St Ethelwold's Primary School (Church in Wales)
- Venerable Edward Morgan School (Roman Catholic primary)
- Ysgol Ty Ffynnon (English-medium primary)
- Ysgol Croes Atti (Welsh-medium primary)
- Ysgol Maes Garmon (Welsh-medium secondary)

John Summers High School (formerly Deeside High School) closed on 20 July 2017.

== Transport ==
Shotton railway station is on the Borderlands Line and the North Wales Coast Line.

== Notable people ==
- Fred Robson (1885–1952) professional golfer, competed in the Open Championship.
- Henry Weale (1897–1959) recipient of the Victoria Cross in World War I.
- Billy Tudor (1918–1965) footballer with 87 club caps, mainly Wrexham A.F.C.
- Marika Humphreys (born 1977) ice dance coach and choreographer, lived in Shotton.

== See also ==
- St Ethelwold's Church, Shotton
