= North Wales and Liverpool Railway =

Former UK railway committee

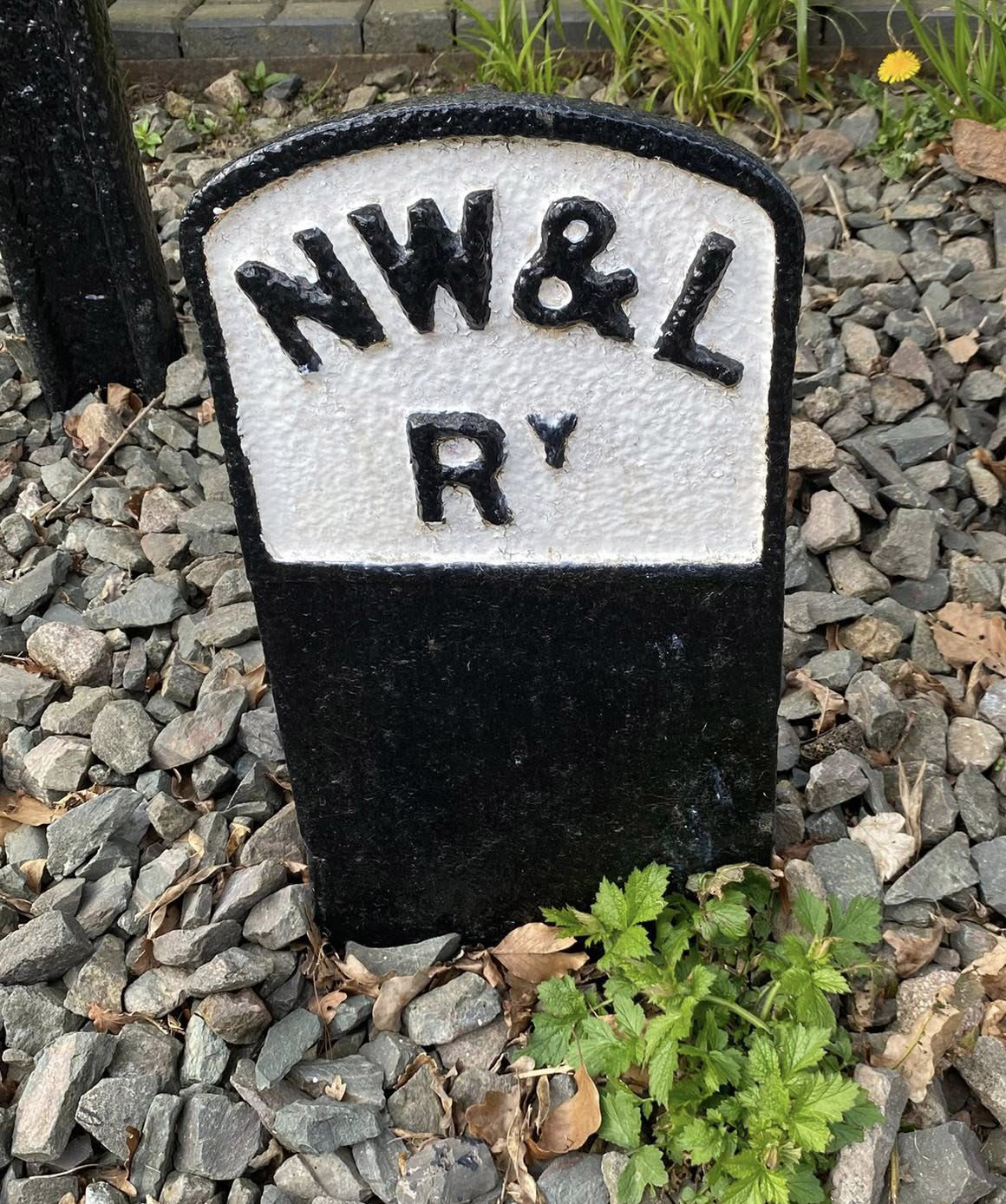
A boundary marker for the North Wales & Liverpool Railway (out of place)

The North Wales and Liverpool Railway (NWLR), was the name given to the joint committee formed to construct a railway between Bidston, on the Wirral Railway and Hawarden on the Manchester, Sheffield and Lincolnshire Railway's (MSLR) Chester & Connah's Quay Railway from Chester to its link with the Wrexham, Mold and Connah's Quay Railway (WMCQR): the committee was between the two latter Railways. When the WMCQR went into receivership in 1897 the MSLR (by then known as the Great Central Railway) bought the combined WMCQR and the Bidston extension. The committee was dissolved in 1904.

The line now forms the Northern part of the Borderlands Line.
