= Wallasey Village railway station =

Railway station serving Wallasey, Merseyside, England

Coordinates: 53.423°N 3.069°W

Wallasey Village
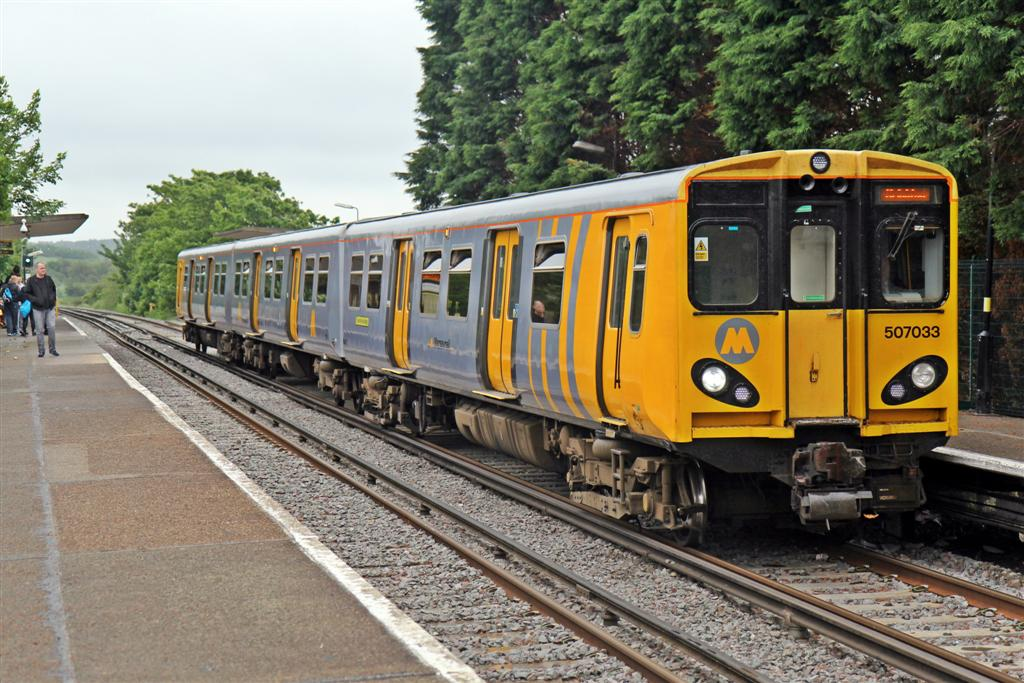

General information
- Location: Wallasey, Wirral; England
- Grid reference: SJ290923
- Manager: Merseyrail
- Transit authority: Merseytravel
- Platforms: 2

Other information
- Station code: WLV
- Fare zone: B1
- Classification: DfT category E

Key dates
- 1907: Opened (as Leasowe Road)
- 1938: Electrified

Passengers
- 2021/22: ▲0.357 million
- 2022/23: ▲0.374 million
- 2023/24: ▲0.414 million
- 2024/25: ▲0.469 million
- 2025/26: ▲0.495 million
Location
Notes
- Passenger statistics from the Office of Rail and Road

Wallasey Village railway station serves the Wallasey Village suburb of Wallasey, in Merseyside, England. It is situated on the Wirral Line 6¼ miles (9 km) west of Liverpool Lime Street on the Merseyrail network.

== History ==
The station was built on the Wirral Railway's route from Birkenhead Park to New Brighton, opening in 1907 under the name Leasowe Road. Through services via the Mersey Railway Tunnel to Liverpool commenced when the line was electrified in 1938 by the London, Midland and Scottish Railway. The station was rebuilt following extensive damage during World War II.

== Facilities ==
The station is staffed, during all opening hours, and has platform CCTV. There is a payphone on platform 1, a booking office, live departure and arrival screens, for passenger information, and each of the two platforms has a waiting room. Being close to the centre of Wallasey Village, itself, the station does not have a free car park or a cycle rack. There is no access, to the platform, for passengers with wheelchairs or prams, as access is by staircase only. In 2006, according to a Transport 2000 survey, the station was considered as a weak link, with regard to access. As yet, platform access has not been modernised to the standard of that at Hooton.

== Services ==
Current service levels are every 15 minutes to Liverpool and New Brighton during Monday to Saturday daytime, and every 30 minutes at other times. These services are all provided by Merseyrail's fleet of Class 777 EMUs.

The station connects to the major bus routes on Leasowe Road.

== Gallery ==
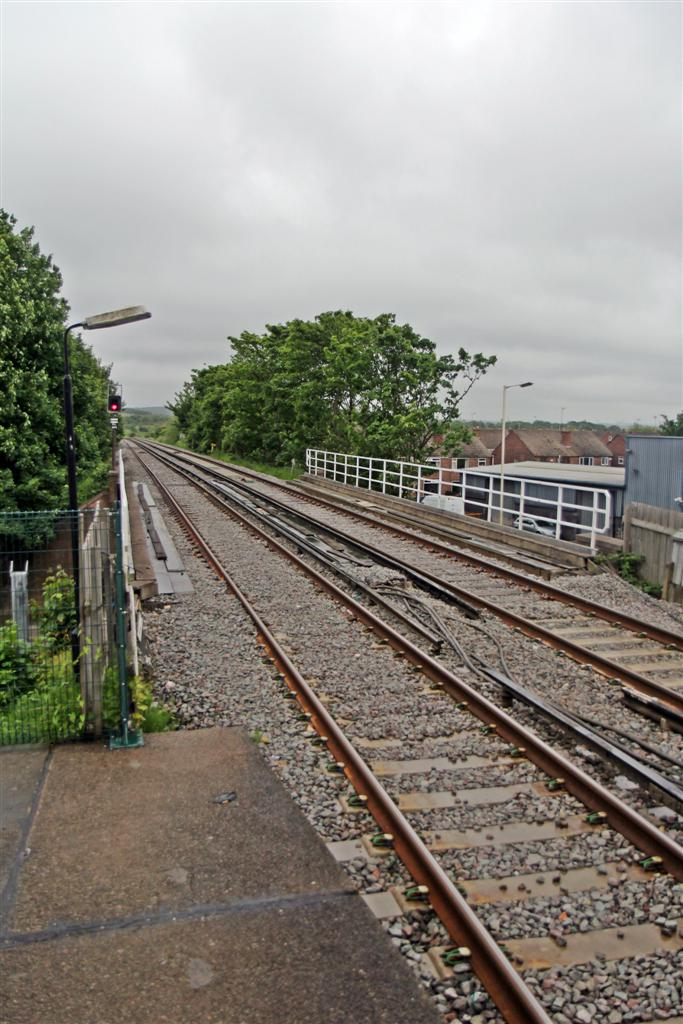
Leasowe Road bridge viewed from the end of the platform.

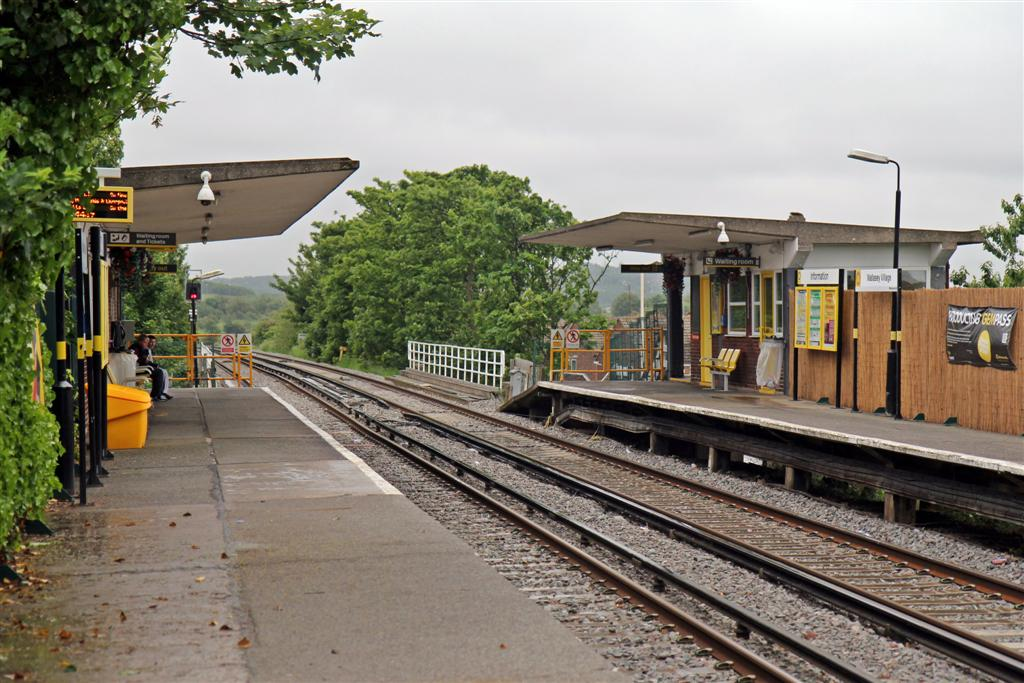
The station buildings.

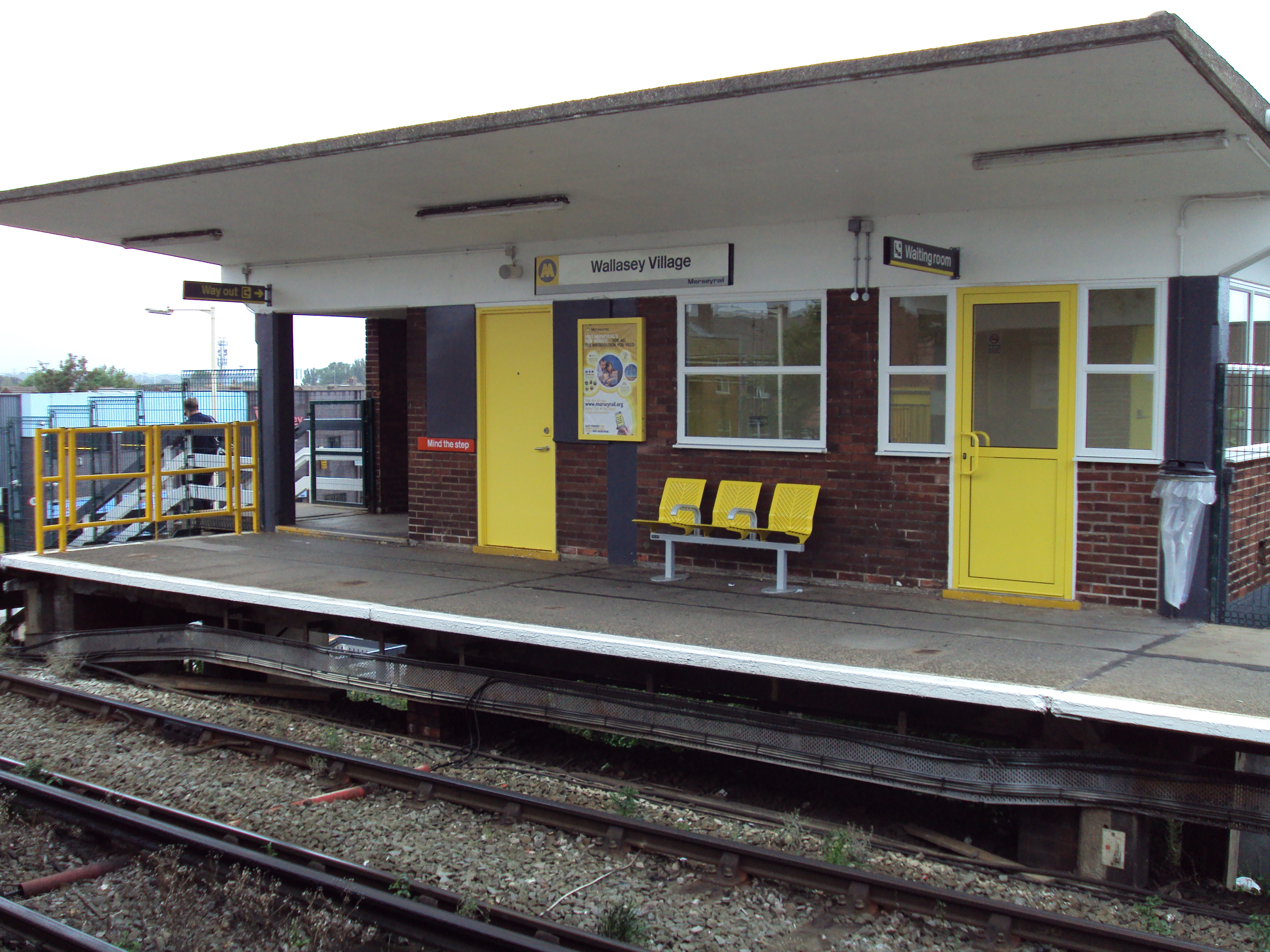
A platform waiting room.

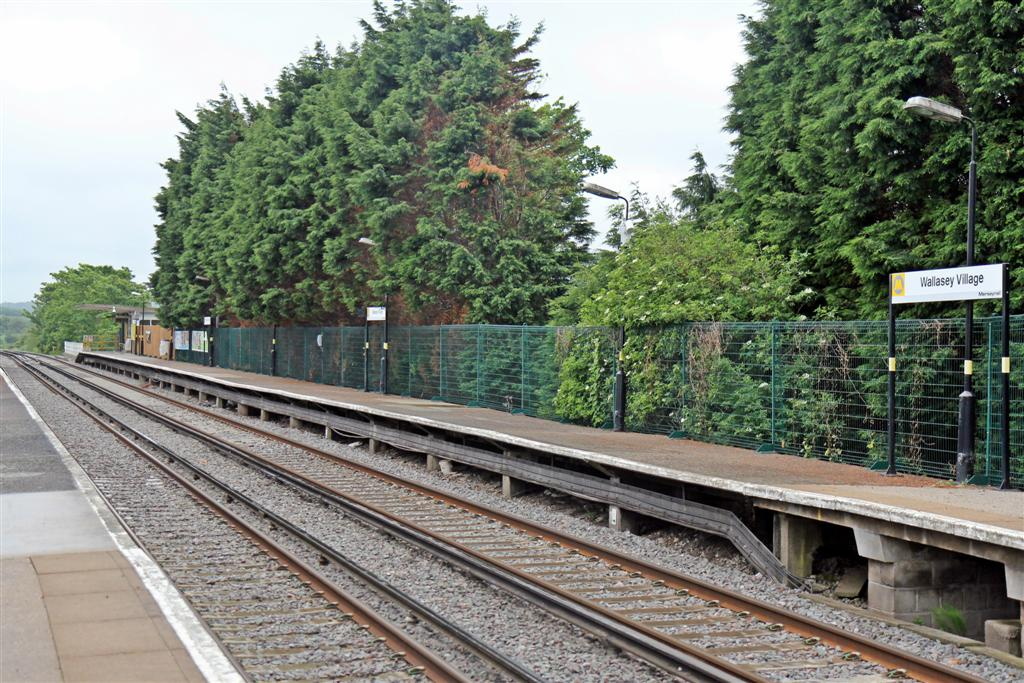
The length of the platform.

Preceding station	National Rail	Following station
Wallasey Grove Road towards New Brighton	Merseyrail; Wirral Line; New Brighton Branch	Birkenhead North towards Liverpool Central
