= Warren railway station =

Former railway station in England

Coordinates: 53.43536°N 3.06116°W

Warren

General information
- Location: New Brighton, Wirral; England
- Grid reference: SJ295937
- Platforms: 2

Other information
- Status: Disused

History
- Opened: 30 March 1888
- Closed: 1 October 1915
- Original company: Seacombe, Hoylake and Deeside Railway
- Pre-grouping: Wirral Railway
Location

Warren railway station was located near New Brighton, Wirral, England. The station was built on the New Brighton branch of the Seacombe, Hoylake and Deeside Railway, between Wallasey Grove Road and New Brighton stations, opening on 30 March 1888. The branch became part of the Wirral Railway on 1 July 1891.

Remotely situated, the station only ever served a small part of the community (and the local golf course). This, combined with an infrequent service, and the later introduction of a tram service on Warren Drive, meant the station was little used, and it was closed on 1 October 1915. The station had one siding nearby, on the seaward side, which was possibly used for the transportation of sand. The foundations of the up platform are extant, and were revealed during engineering work in 2006. The line past the station site remains in use as part of the Wirral Line, now operated by Merseyrail.

Preceding station	Historical railways	Following station
New Brighton; Line and station open	London, Midland and Scottish Railway; Wirral Railway	Wallasey Grove Road; Line and station open
