= Conway Park railway station =

Railway station in Merseyside, England

Coordinates: 53.393°N 3.023°W

Conway Park
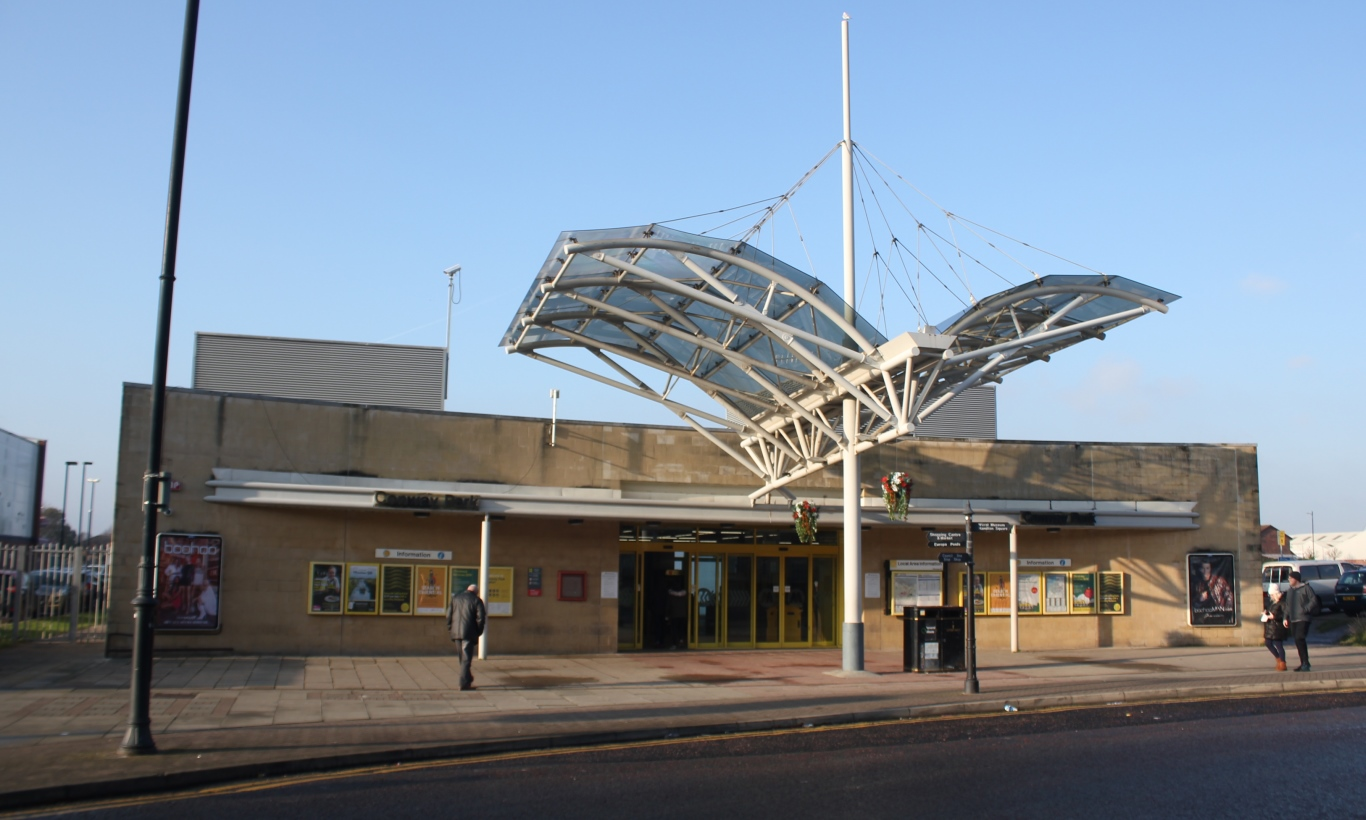
- The surface-level building

General information
- Location: Birkenhead, Wirral; England
- Grid reference: SJ320889
- Manager: Merseyrail
- Transit authority: Merseytravel
- Platforms: 2

Other information
- Station code: CNP
- Fare zone: B1
- Classification: DfT category E

Key dates
- 1998: Opened

Passengers
- 2020/21: ▼0.302 million
- 2021/22: ▲0.625 million
- 2022/23: ▲0.650 million
- 2023/24: ▼0.647 million
- 2024/25: ▼0.630 million
- 2025/26: ▲0.636 million
Location
Notes
- Passenger statistics from the Office of Rail and Road

Conway Park railway station is situated in the centre of Birkenhead, Merseyside, England. It lies on the Wirral Line of the Merseyrail network.

== History ==
Conway Park is the newest station on the Wirral Line. In 1990, the Merseyside Development Corporation joined with British Rail and Merseyrail to study the cost of the new station. The station opened to the public on 22 June 1998, after an official opening by Neil Kinnock on 24 April 1998. Conway Park is between Birkenhead Park and Hamilton Square stations built into an underground tunnel built by the Mersey Railway in the 1880s. It was built by excavating a box downwards, opening out the roof of the tunnel, which is 18 m (59 ft) below ground level. The platforms are reached by stairs or lifts from the ticket office.

The station was built in order to provide a station on the lines from New Brighton and West Kirby that was more convenient for the town centre of Birkenhead than either Birkenhead Park or Hamilton Square (which are otherwise the nearest stations). Its name comes from the name of the redevelopment area on the north side of the town centre in which it is situated. The platforms are protected by ticket barriers. The road which the station is situated on is Europa Boulevard.

== Facilities ==
The station is staffed during all opening hours and has platform CCTV. There are toilets, a payphone, a vending machine, booking office and live departure and arrival screens, for passenger information. The station does not have a free car park, though there is a drop-off point on Europa Boulevard, as well as a "Pay and Display" car park, to the rear of the station as viewed from Birkenhead town centre. Step-free access to the platforms, for wheelchairs and prams, is possible, via the lifts. Each platform also has sheltered seating. Free Wi-Fi was introduced in October 2015. There is secure cycle parking for 10 cycles.

== Services ==
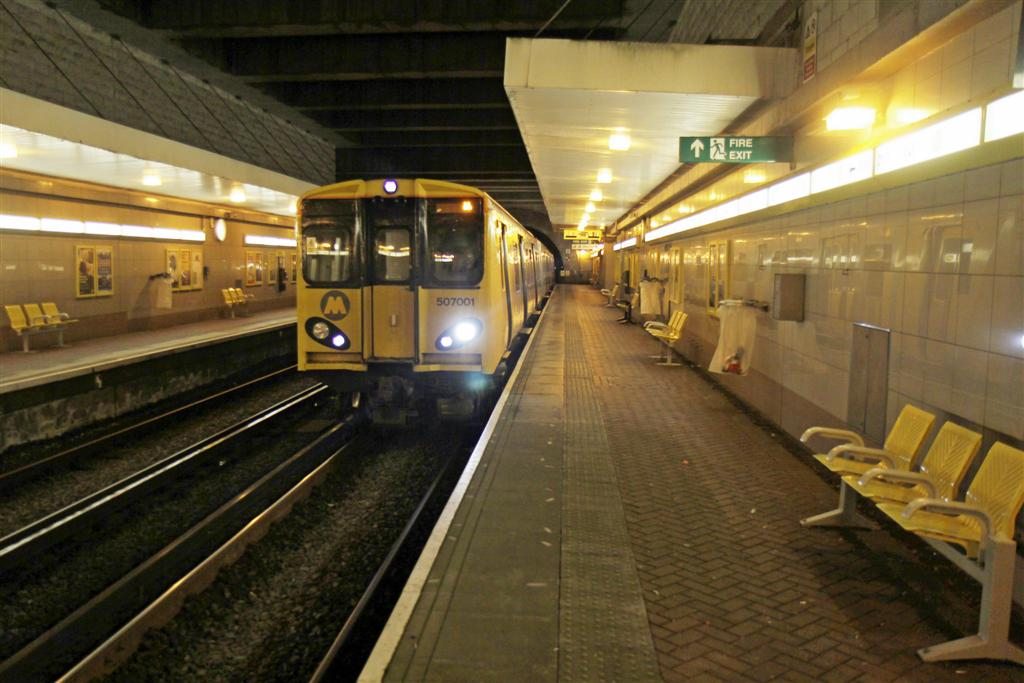
A Merseyrail Class 507

During the daytime peak (7:00 - 19:00), there are four trains per hour to New Brighton and West Kirby and eight trains per hour to Liverpool. Outside of the daytime peak, the frequency is halved. These services are provided by Merseyrail's fleet of Class 777 EMUs.

== See also ==
Conway Park on Merseyrail

- List of underground stations of the Merseyrail network

| Preceding station | National Rail | Following station |
|---|---|---|
| Birkenhead Park towards New Brighton or West Kirby | Merseyrail; Wirral Line | Hamilton Square towards Liverpool Central |
