= Wallasey (disambiguation) =

Wallasey is a town within the Metropolitan Borough of Wirral, in Merseyside, England.

Wallasey may also refer to:

- Wallasey (UK Parliament constituency), a constituency in Merseyside
- Wallasey (ward), a Wirral Council ward
- Wallasey Village, a district of the town of Wallasey
