= Birkenhead Park railway station =

Railway station in Merseyside, England

Birkenhead Park
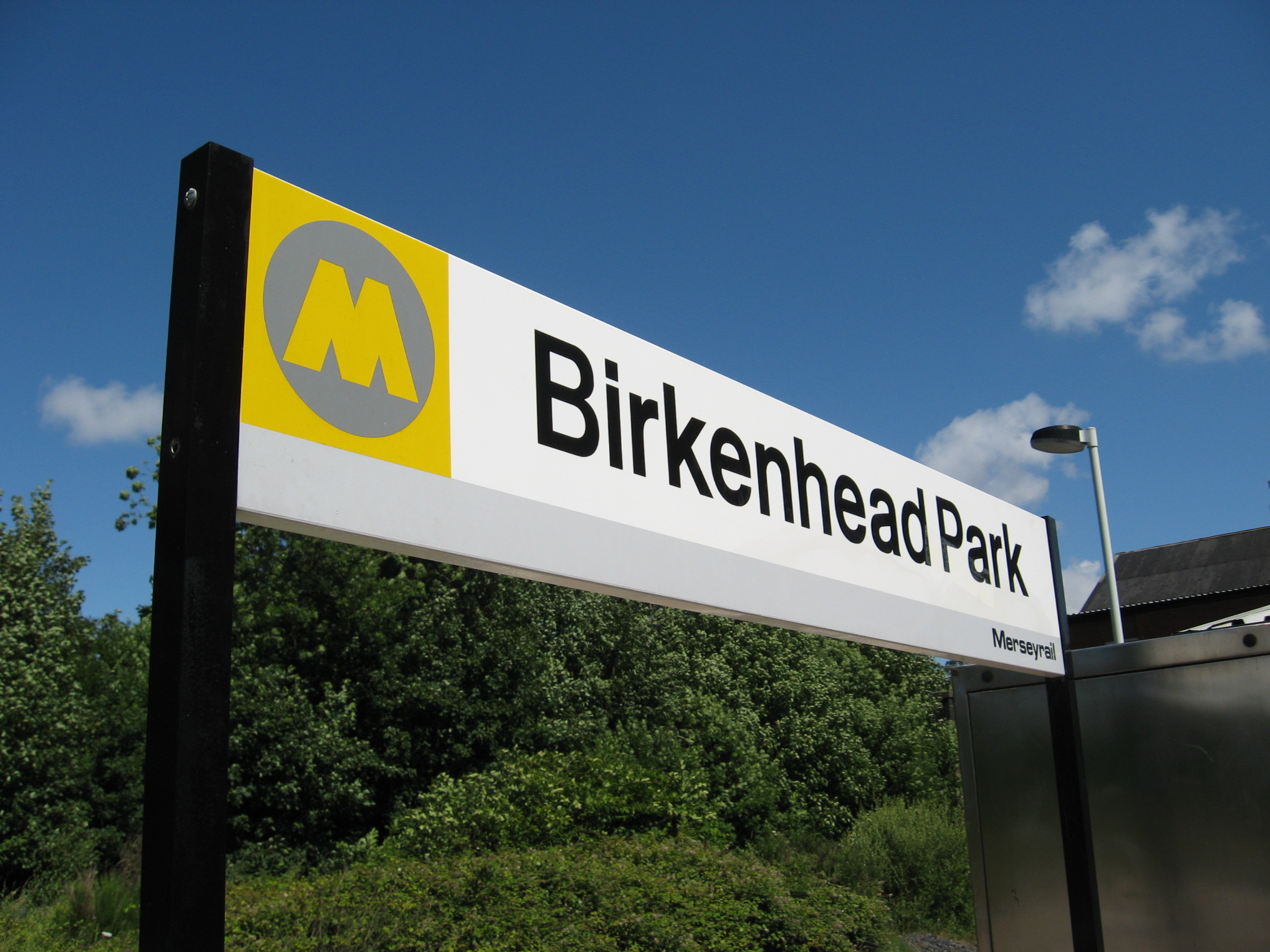

General information
- Location: Birkenhead, Wirral; England
- Coordinates: 53.3974°N 3.0390°W
- Grid reference: SJ310894
- Manager: Merseyrail
- Transit authority: Merseytravel
- Platforms: 2

Other information
- Station code: BKP
- Fare zone: B1
- Classification: DfT category E

Key dates
- 1888: Opened
- 1938: Electrified

Passengers
- 2021/22: ▲0.536 million
- 2022/23: ▲0.596 million
- 2023/24: ▲0.631 million
- 2024/25: ▲0.670 million
- 2025/26: ▲0.766 million
Location
Notes
- Passenger statistics from the Office of Rail and Road

Birkenhead Park on the Wirral Line

Birkenhead Park railway station is a station serving the town of Birkenhead, in Merseyside, England. It lies on the Wirral Line of the Merseyrail network.

== History ==
The name of the station comes from nearby Birkenhead Park, one of the UK's first Victorian municipal parks. In 1850 its layout - created by Joseph Paxton - had a profound influence on visiting American landscape architect Frederick Law Olmsted. Eight years later he took inspiration from Birkenhead Park (and other green spaces like Derby Arboretum) to win a competition to design New York's new city park.

The station was opened on 2 January 1888, as a joint interchange station between the Seacombe, Hoylake and Deeside Railway and the Mersey Railway. The station replaced the Wirral Railway's original terminus at Wallasey Bridge Road, which was close to the present-day Birkenhead North station. The station was an interchange between the Wirral Railway's line to West Kirby and the Mersey Railway's new line to Liverpool Central low level station. On the same day of opening, the Wirral Railway's new line to Wallasey Grove Road opened, which was extended to New Brighton later the same year.

The station was built at the western portal of the Mersey Railway tunnel that ran into central Birkenhead and Liverpool's city centre. From its opening the station had two island platforms to facilitate across-platform transfer between the Mersey Railway and the Wirral Railway. The northern pair of tracks were used exclusively by Mersey Railway trains. The centre and southern pairs of tracks were available to the Wirral Railway.

=== Mersey Railway electrification ===
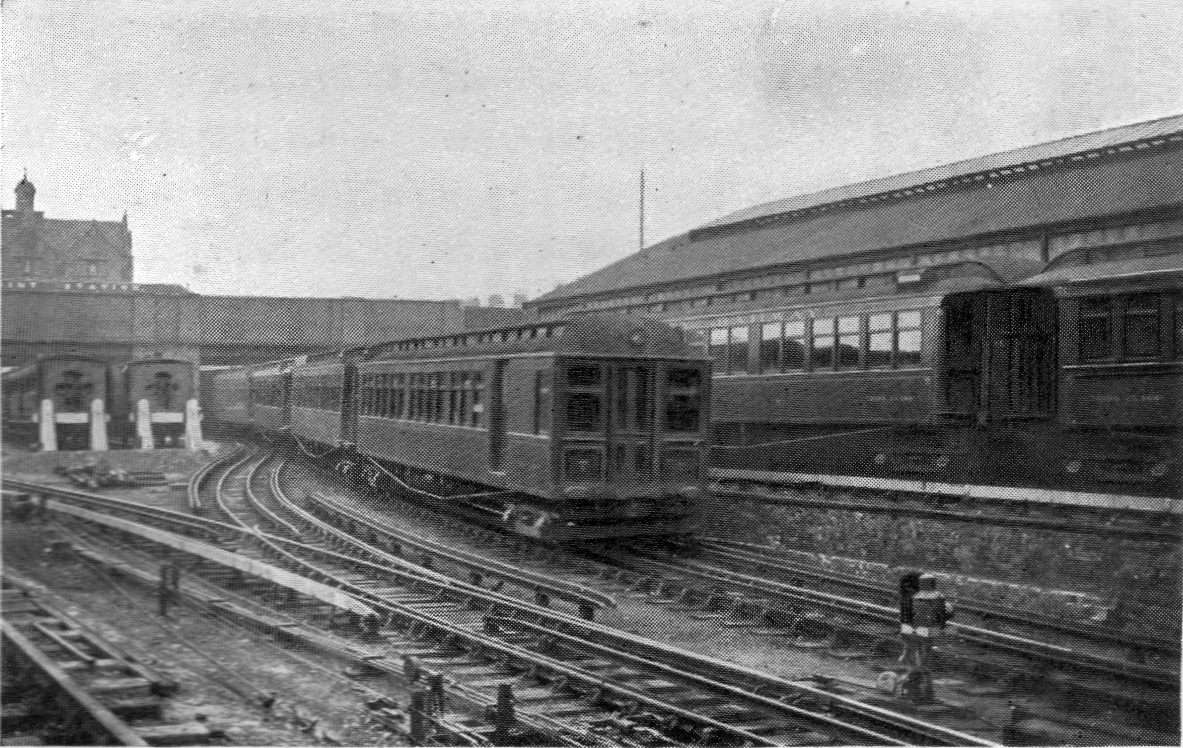
Mersey Railway electric train leaving Birkenhead Park.

On 3 May 1903, the Mersey Railway to Liverpool was changed over from steam to electric trains, with a 650 V DC fourth rail system and Mersey Railway electric units built by Westinghouse.

There was a small Mersey Railway electric car shed at the eastern end of the station, on the northern side of the line, which held two 6-car trains. This was built on level ground, with the tracks towards the tunnel to Liverpool dropping steeply alongside. The car shed was removed in the 1970s.

=== Fatal accident ===
On 6 December 1922 an accident occurred at the station, at around 4pm, between two trains of the Wirral Railway. The train heading to West Kirby, which was late, was leaving the station and collided with a train from West Kirby. There was one fatality and eight other passengers sustained serious injuries, with a further 36 people suffering from shock. This was the first fatal passenger accident to occur on the Wirral Railway.

=== LMS electrification ===
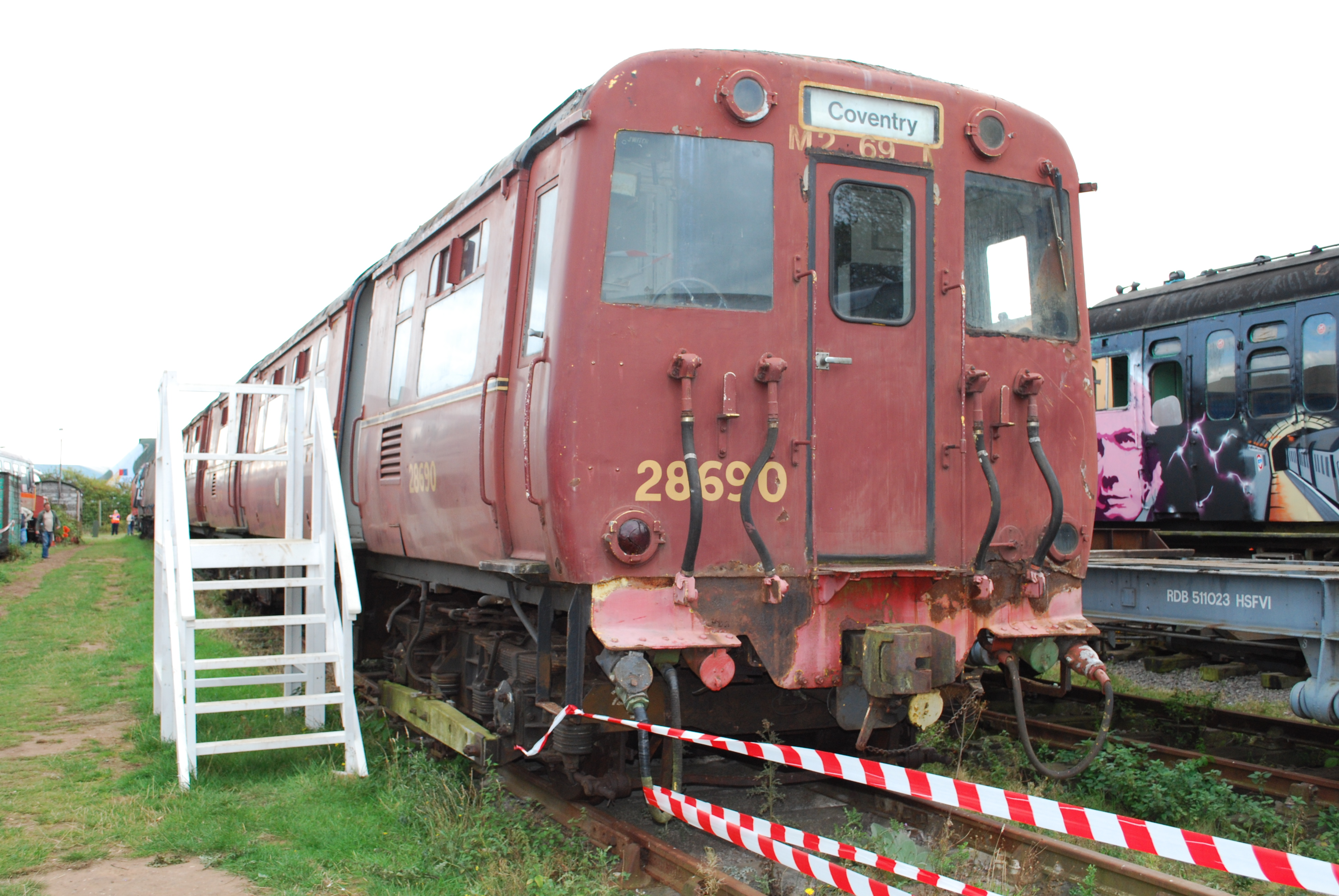
A preserved LMS Wirral and Mersey unit at the Electric Railway Museum, Coventry.

Between 1936 and 1938, The London, Midland and Scottish Railway electrified the lines from Birkenhead Park to West Kirby and New Brighton using a 650 V DC third rail to match the system of the Mersey Railway. The smoke free electric trains facilitated through operation to underground sections of Birkenhead and Liverpool, with the line terminating at Liverpool Central low level station. The LMS electric trains were brought into passenger service on 14 March 1938. The need to change at Birkenhead Park was removed transforming the station into a through station. It was normal for the new LMS trains to operate the Liverpool to West Kirby route, and the older Mersey Railway trains to operate the Liverpool to New Brighton route, except for Sundays and bank holidays.

From 1938 electrification of the Wirral lines integrated both the Mersey Railway and LMS (Wirral) railway services to New Brighton and West Kirby. However the former Wirral Railway branch to Seacombe was still operated by steam trains, not those of its owner the LMS but trains of the LNER from the Chester and Wrexham lines through Bidston. The additional facilities beyond a simple two-track through station became redundant at Birkenhead Park. Despite which, the layout retained all four platforms, two in each direction, until the 1970s. A new 60-lever signal box was opened in 1938, which was reduced to 25 levers in 1972 and which closed on 28 February 1988.

=== World War II bombing ===
The station building is not the original. The first station building was destroyed when two aerial bombs were dropped by German aircraft on the night of 12–13 March 1941, during the Second World War. After the bombing, through services were restored after five days with the station reopened to passengers after eleven days.

=== Postwar ===
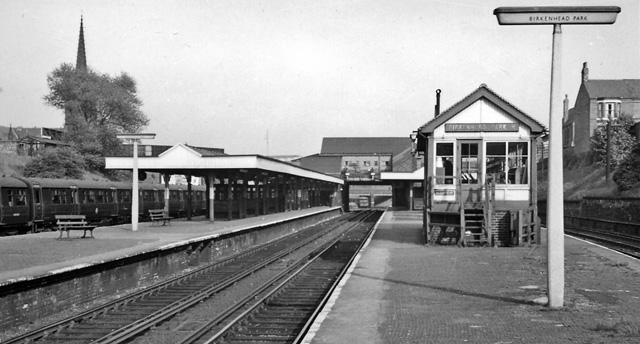
Birkenhead Park station in 1961, with the signal box on the platform to the right, and the northern platform to the left.

The outer platform faces were hardly used, apart from a handful of trains which were stored outside peak hours in the sidings which remained at all four corners of the station, and outside the island platforms. In the 1970s, there were a number of rationalisations to the layout. At one stage, through trains used the outer tracks of the station, while a bay platform was fashioned between these to allow a short-lived Liverpool-to-Birkenhead Park extra peak-hour shuttle service. The layout was then simplified again to the current one, retaining the former southern island platform with just a through road either side, with the former northern platform demolished in 1992.

== Facilities ==
The station is staffed, during all opening hours, and has platform CCTV. The island platform has a waiting shelter. There is a payphone, booking office and live departure and arrival screens, for passenger information. A 16-capacity lift was opened in August 2022, allowing step-free access for all passengers. The station has no car park but there is secure cycle storage for 32 bikes.

== Services ==
Trains operate every 15 minutes (Monday to Saturday daytime) to New Brighton and West Kirby and every 5–10 minutes via Birkenhead Hamilton Square and the Mersey Railway Tunnel to Liverpool. At other times, trains run every 30 minutes to New Brighton and West Kirby, and every 15 minutes to Liverpool. These services are all provided by Merseyrail's fleet of Class 777 EMUs.

Preceding station	National Rail	Following station
Birkenhead North towards New Brighton or West Kirby	Merseyrail; Wirral Line	Conway Park towards Liverpool Central
