= Birkenhead North railway station =

Railway station in Merseyside, England

Birkenhead North
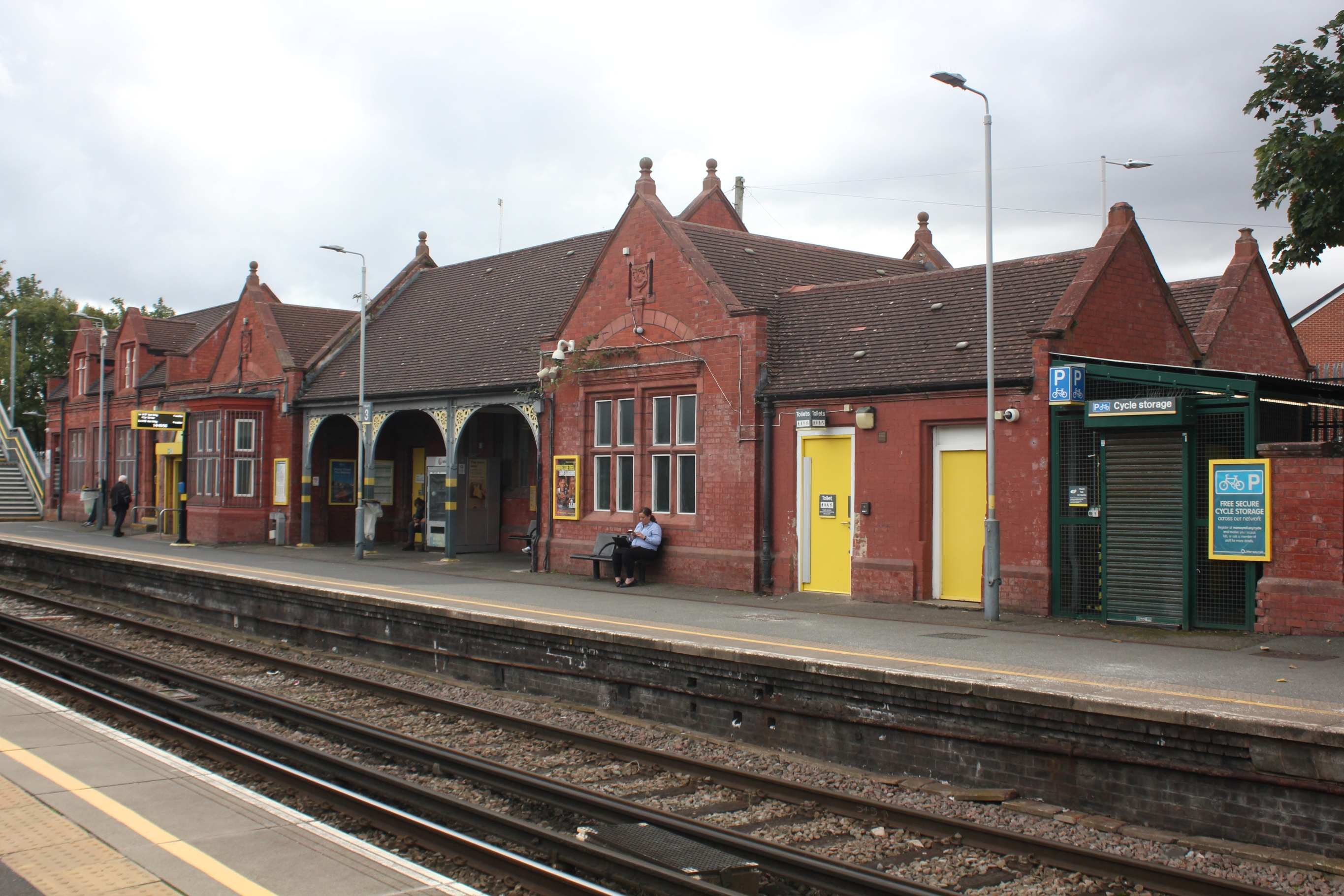
- The buildings on platform 3

General information
- Location: Birkenhead, Wirral; England
- Coordinates: 53.405°N 3.057°W
- Grid reference: SJ298902
- Manager: Merseyrail
- Transit authority: Merseytravel
- Platforms: 3 (only 2 see regular use)

Other information
- Station code: BKN
- Fare zone: B1
- Classification: DfT category E

History
- Original company: Hoylake Railway
- Pre-grouping: Wirral Railway
- Post-grouping: London, Midland and Scottish Railway

Key dates
- 2 January 1888: Opened as Birkenhead Docks
- 1926: Renamed Birkenhead North
- 1938: Electrified

Passengers
- 2020/21: ▼0.298 million
- Interchange: ▼32,163
- 2021/22: ▲0.681 million
- Interchange: ▲68,755
- 2022/23: ▲0.878 million
- Interchange: ▲71,783
- 2023/24: ▲0.985 million
- Interchange: ▲80,816
- 2024/25: ▼0.944 million
- Interchange: ▲91,287
Location
Notes
- Passenger statistics from the Office of Rail and Road

Birkenhead North railway station serves the town of Birkenhead, in Merseyside, England. The station is situated on the Wirral Line of the Merseyrail network, close to the junction of the New Brighton and West Kirby branches. Birkenhead North TMD, situated just to the west of the station, is the main traction maintenance depot for the Merseyrail fleet.

== History ==
The station was built by the Wirral Railway, replacing their earlier terminus at Wallasey Bridge Road (a short distance away), which had opened in 1866. The station was originally known as Birkenhead Docks and opened on 2 January 1888 as a through station with Birkenhead Park station becoming the new terminus.

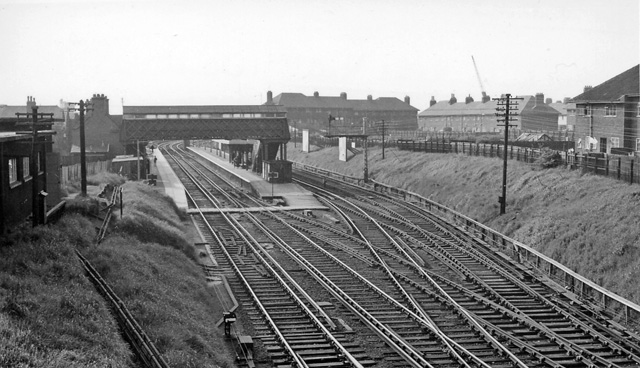
Birkenhead North Station in 1961

The station had three through platforms prior to 1898, which it still retains to the present day. However, the outer face of the north side island platform sees little use apart from trains to and from Birkenhead North depot at the start and end of service.

=== LMS Era ===
The Wirral Railway subsequently became part of the London, Midland and Scottish Railway, which renamed the station Birkenhead North in 1926. The line through Birkenhead North was electrified, using a 650 V DC third rail system, and brought into passenger service on 14 March 1938, allowing through services from New Brighton to Liverpool Central via the Mersey Railway Tunnel. Services used the new LMS trains and the former Mersey Railway electric units. The Mersey Railway electric units operated through the station until 1957.

=== Wrexham diesel service ===
From 4 January 1971 until 2 October 1978, the diesel service on the Bidston to Wrexham line, which had previously operated from New Brighton, was diverted to Birkenhead North. These trains terminated on the centre platform (2) which had previously been used for Liverpool-bound services, and when one of the diesel trains was present (which in that timetable was much of the time), Liverpool-bound electric services used the outer north side of the island platform (1) instead. The diesel service was cut back to Bidston on 2 October, 1978. Regular use of the outer platform (1) at Birkenhead North thereafter ceased.

=== Signal boxes ===
Birkenhead North No. 1 was a 40-lever signal box which was situated at the western end of the southern platform and opened in 1888. This signal box closed on 9 September 1994 and was demolished over the following two days.

Birkenhead North No. 2 was a 25-lever signal box which was situated to the west of the station, approximately a third of the distance towards Bidston. The box was located on the northern side of the Wirral Line at the junction with the Birkenhead Dock Branch goods line. The signal box was closed on 15 September 1994 and was subject to arson in November 1994.

== Facilities ==
The station has a booking office, and on-street parking, which has been upgraded and replaced with a Park and Ride facility, linked directly to the platform. The station is staffed, at all times during opening hours, and has platform CCTV. Each platform has open-air seating and live departure and arrival screens, for passenger information. There is a payphone available. The station provides a Park and Ride service. There are 630 car parking spaces which are free to use for travellers, with lighting columns and CCTV to meet Merseytravel's Travelsafe requirements. There is secure cycle storage for 12 cycles. In 2016 charging posts were added to the car park for the recharging of electric vehicles. As of 4 June 2014, there is step-free access to the platforms for passengers with wheelchairs or prams.

== Services ==
Trains operate every 15 minutes (Monday to Saturday daytime) to New Brighton and West Kirby and every 5–10 minutes via Birkenhead Hamilton Square to Liverpool. At other times, trains run every 30 minutes to New Brighton and West Kirby, and every 15 minutes to Liverpool. These services are all provided by Merseyrail's fleet of Class 777 EMUs.

== Gallery ==
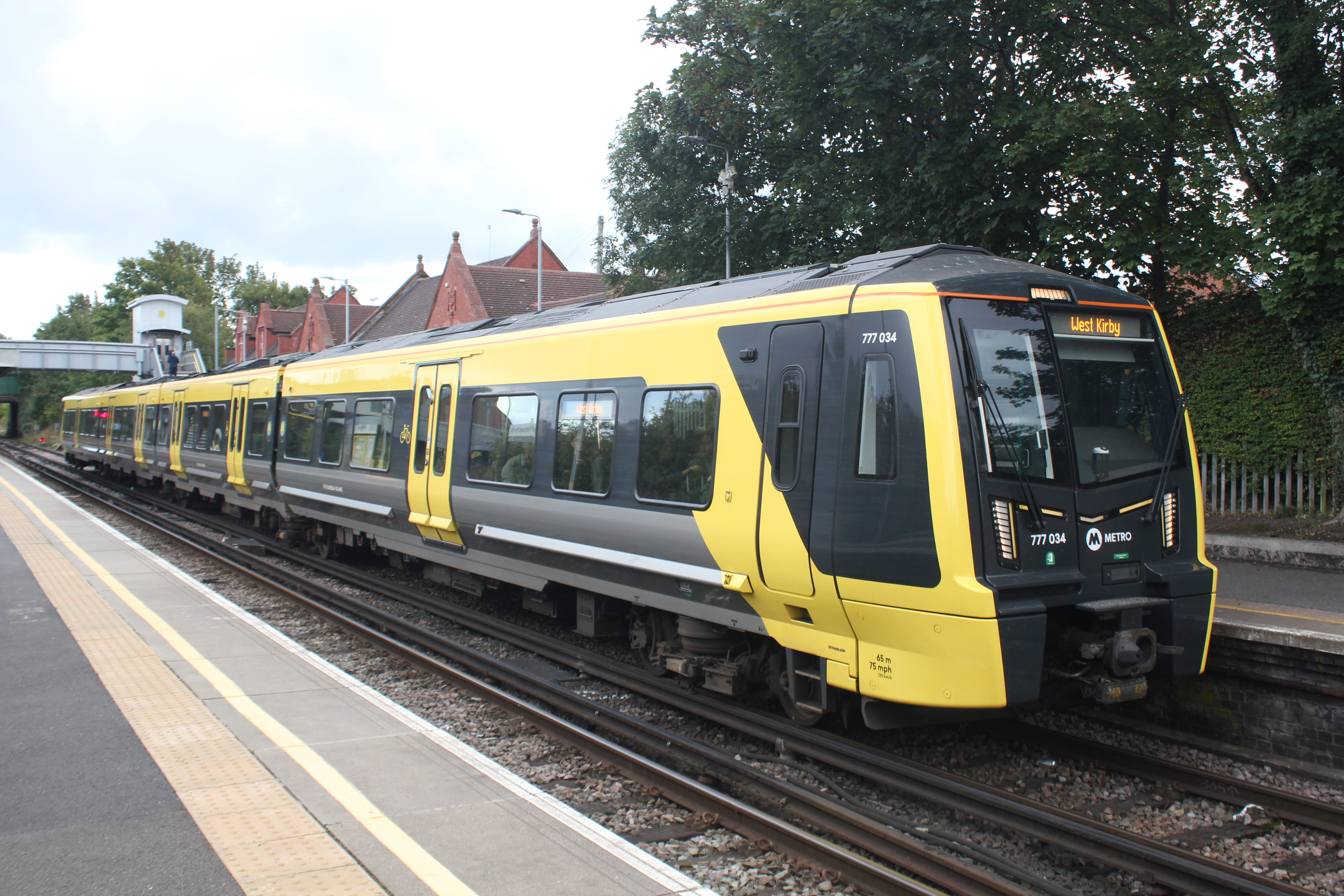
A Class 777 with a service to West Kirby

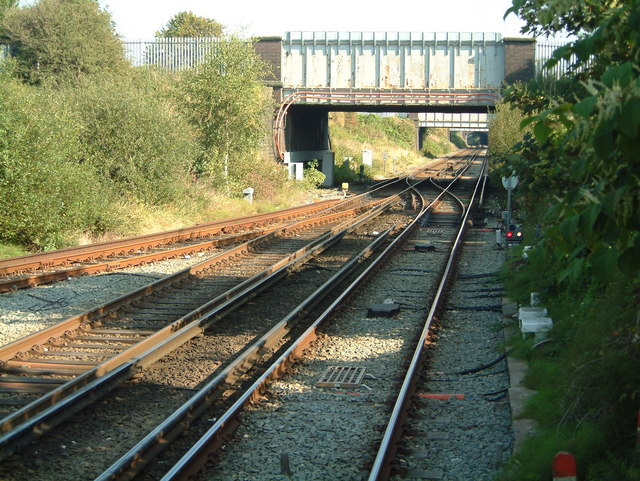
The view along the line towards Birkenhead Park

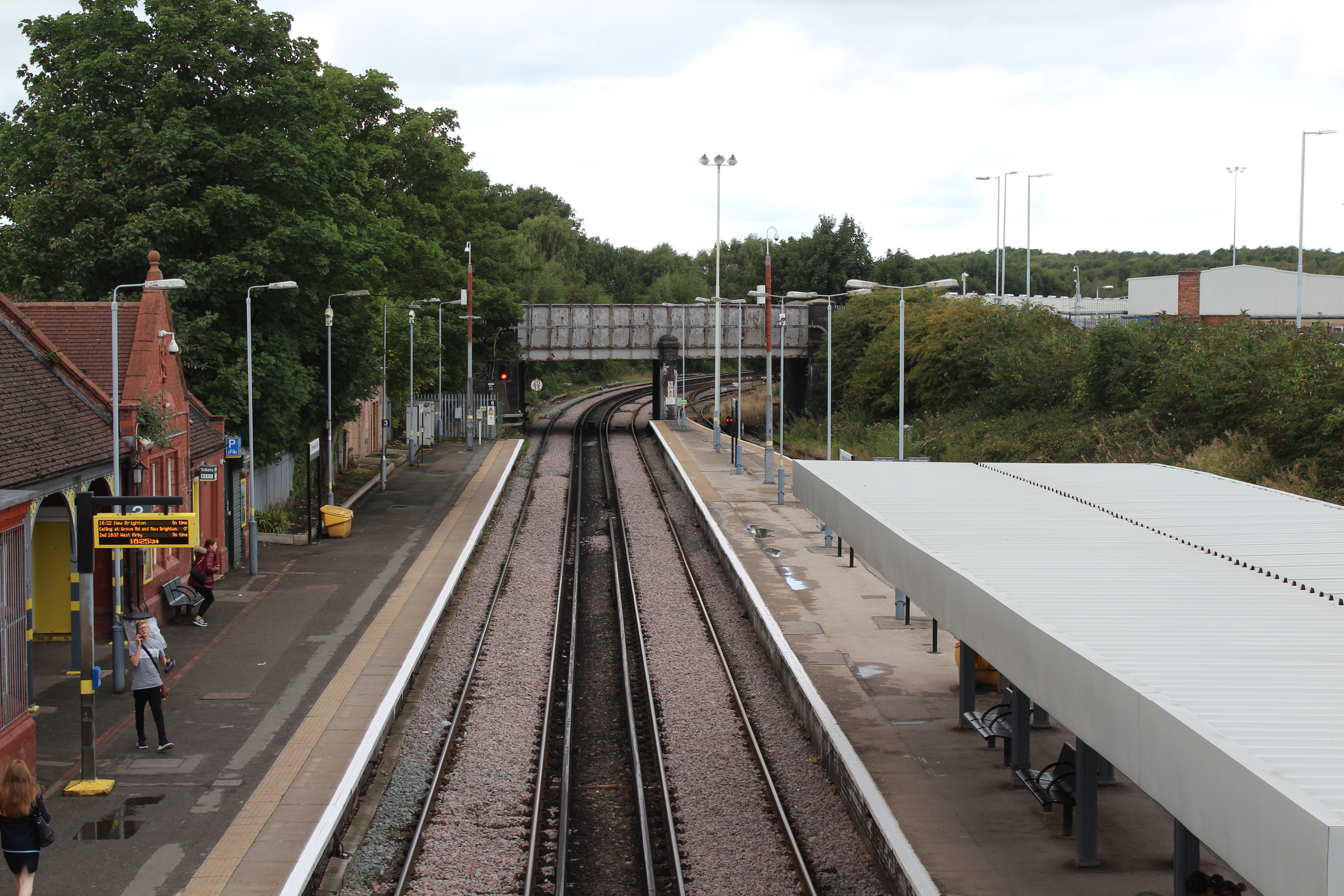
Looking north towards Bidston from the footbridge

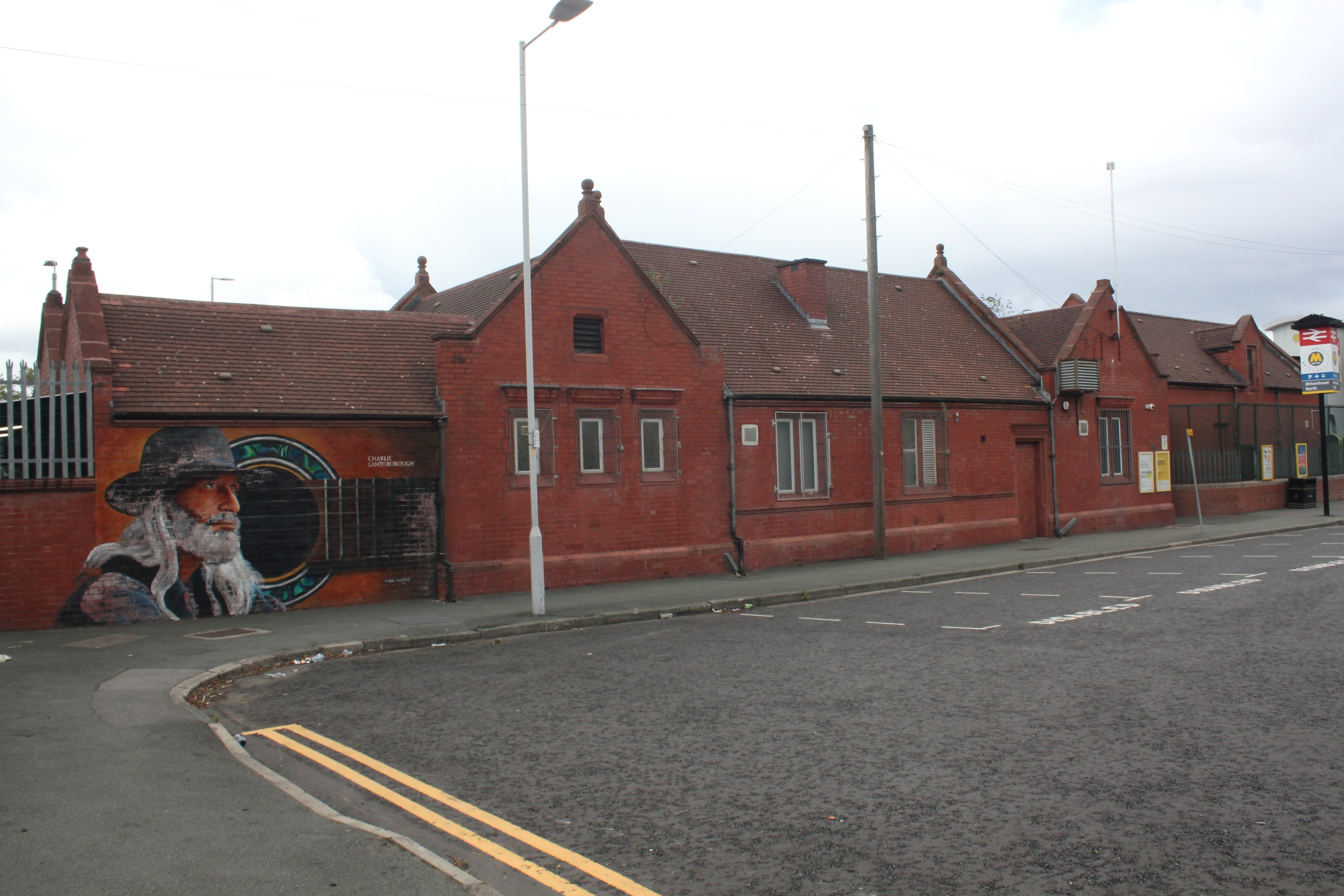
The station frontage in 2025

Preceding station	National Rail	Following station
Wallasey Village towards New Brighton	Merseyrail; Wirral Line; New Brighton/West Kirby Branches	Birkenhead Park towards Liverpool Central
Bidston towards West Kirby	Merseyrail; Wirral Line; New Brighton/West Kirby Branches	Birkenhead Park towards Liverpool Central
	Disused railways	
Liscard and Poulton	Wirral Railway; Seacombe Branch	Terminus
