= Akinwale Arobieke =

British convicted criminal (1961–2025)

- Born: Akinwale Oluwafolajimi Oluwatope Arobieke; 15 July 1961; Crumpsall, Lancashire, England
- Died: 26 August 2025 (aged 64); Toxteth, Liverpool, England
- Other name: Purple Aki
- Motive: Obsessive behaviour
- Conviction: Manslaughter (1988; overturned on appeal); Harassment (2003); Witness intimidation (2003)

Akinwale Oluwafolajimi Oluwatope Arobieke (15 July 1961 – 26 August 2025) was a British man whose criminal history included convictions for harassment and witness intimidation, largely arising from his repeated approaches to young men about their physiques. His behaviour included touching or measuring men's muscles and asking them to perform squats while carrying his weight. He was widely known by the nickname Purple Aki, which he regarded as racist, and preferred to be called "Andy". In 2003, he pleaded guilty to 15 counts of harassment and witness intimidation and was sentenced to six years' imprisonment.

Arobieke had previously been convicted of involuntary manslaughter following the 1986 death of 16-year-old Gary Kelly, who was electrocuted at New Brighton railway station while allegedly fleeing from him. The conviction was overturned on appeal on the basis that Arobieke had not acted unlawfully merely by being present at the station, and he later received compensation following allegations of racial overtones in the prosecution. After his release from prison in 2006, Merseyside Police obtained a Sexual Offences Prevention Order that restricted him from touching or measuring people's muscles and from asking them to perform squats, despite his never having been convicted of a sexual offence. He was subsequently convicted several times of breaching the order. It was lifted in May 2016 after a judge concluded that its restrictions could no longer be justified.

Arobieke also made a series of complaints about his treatment by police. A Greater Manchester Police investigation upheld several complaints concerning officers' conduct, and in 2022 he received a substantial but undisclosed settlement of a civil claim against the force for malicious prosecution and misfeasance in public office. He also objected to portrayals of him that he considered racially discriminatory, including use of the "Purple Aki" nickname and a 2016 BBC Three documentary about him.

== Early life ==
Akinwale Oluwafolajimi Oluwatope Arobieke was born on 15 July 1961 at Crumpsall Hospital in Crumpsall, Lancashire. His mother was a secretarial student of Nigerian descent; his father's identity is unknown. He was placed in care at the age of six months, and spent some time in a Barnardo's home in Llandudno. As an adult, he held several jobs, such as a cleaner in the Mersey Tunnels, and as a messenger for Liverpool City Council.

== Criminal history ==
=== Alleged manslaughter ===
On 15 June 1986, a 16-year-old from Birkenhead named Gary Kelly died from electrocution at New Brighton railway station. He was allegedly running away from Arobieke, who the boy's family claimed had been harassing him for some time prior to the incident. Arobieke was convicted of involuntary manslaughter but successfully appealed against the conviction on the grounds that he had not acted unlawfully by "standing on the platform and looking into trains". In addition, Arobieke was awarded an estimated £35,000 compensation due to alleged racial overtones in the prosecution case.

=== Indecent assault and witness intimidation ===
Arobieke appeared in court on 22 November 2001, pleading not guilty to 50 counts of indecent assault and harassment against 14 teenage boys between February 1995 and September 2000. He was convicted of threatening behaviour and jailed for 30 months.

Released in 2003, Arobieke resumed his activities and was quickly arrested and charged. During the course of the trial, 123 people were interviewed by police, including one family who were forced into witness protection as a result of threats from Arobieke. This led to Arobieke being additionally charged with witness intimidation. On 15 December 2003, he was jailed for six years by Preston Crown Court, where he pleaded guilty to 15 counts of harassment and witness intimidation. A further 61 counts, mostly of indecent assault, were left on file. In sentencing Arobieke, judge Edward Slinger said, "You are a danger to young men, and your behaviour is both strange and obsessive." After the case, Detective Superintendent Mike Dale said, "Over the years, Akinwale Arobieke has been persistent in his pursuit and harassment of a number of young men, instilling fear into them. We are pleased with the sentencing. Most importantly it's to the credit of the witnesses, who despite their fears and apprehensions, have remained steadfast and determined to see justice done and this man prosecuted to stop him from making other people's lives a misery."

=== Muscle touch ban ===
Arobieke was released on licence from prison on 26 October 2006. Unusually, Merseyside Police applied to Liverpool Magistrates' Court for an interim Sexual Offences Prevention Order against him, although he was never convicted of a sex offence. Under the terms of the order, he was banned from touching, feeling, or measuring anyone's muscles; asking people to do squats in public; entering the towns of St Helens, Warrington, or Widnes without police permission; and loitering near schools, gyms, or sports clubs. The ban was later overturned as "draconian", but remained in force after a successful appeal by police.

On 25 May 2007, Arobieke approached a man in a shopping centre in Preston and commented upon the size of his biceps before "touching them without permission". He was arrested shortly afterwards on suspicion of breaching his Sexual Offences Prevention Order, and later convicted and jailed for a further 15 months, with the muscle touching ban being made permanent.

In July 2008, Arobieke was unsuccessful in trying to overturn the "muscle touching ban", at one point "behaving erratically" just before appearing in court. During the case proceedings, details of Arobieke's "stalker's manual" were disclosed; this was a book Arobieke had compiled that was "full of details about victims' body measurements, contact numbers and families". It was alleged that he would "do research into his victim, confronting them with such details as their father's car registration number or sibling's place of education".

In addition, DC Andrew Rowlings claimed that Arobieke "became sexually aroused while forcing terrified young men to perform 'inverted piggybacks' – ordering them to squat so he could lean over their backs with his face by their buttocks and his genitalia on their necks, while squeezing their quad muscles". During the court case, Arobieke made an apology to his victims and admitted that he was "infamous, notorious, everything from a bogeyman to whatever".

=== Breaches of SOPO ===
In late 2008, Arobieke approached a 17-year-old in Birkenhead and asked to feel his biceps. By doing so, he was in breach of the Sexual Offences Prevention Order (SOPO) which specifically prohibited him from approaching young men and touching their muscles. He was arrested and convicted for this breach of the SOPO, receiving a sentence of 18 months.

In April 2010, Arobieke appeared in court in the Welsh town of Mold, having been charged with further offences. On 24 June 2010, after a jury found him guilty of touching the calf and quadriceps muscles of a 16-year-old boy in Llandudno, the judge said that Arobieke was a "sexual predator" and jailed him for two and a half years. The offence was a breach of his Sexual Offences Prevention Order. Arobieke, who defended himself in court, insisted he was the victim of malicious false allegations to the police: "They receive several calls a day saying I am in locations across the country even when I am in prison."

In June 2012, Merseyside Police issued a statement denying rumours that Arobieke had died and stating that he remained in prison. The same month, Arobieke was released from prison after serving two years of his sentence. He was arrested in August after attending a bodybuilding competition at the Royal Northern College of Music in Manchester, an event he was prohibited from attending under the conditions of his bail.

In August 2013, Arobieke was put on trial at Manchester Crown Court after being accused of targeting young men in St Peter's Square in Manchester, as well as in Trafford and Bolton, and was cleared of all charges.

In February 2014, a Greater Manchester Police Professional Standards investigation found evidence to support police misconduct against Arobieke. This related to interactions with an off-duty police officer at bodybuilding events in the second half of 2012 (one of which led to arrest) and an October 2013 trial during which Arobieke was found not guilty of breaching his Sexual Offences Prevention Order. Arobieke claimed to have spent almost two years in prison awaiting charges that were either dropped or of which he was acquitted.

On 1 October 2015, Arobieke was once again found guilty of breaching his SOPO, having asked to touch and measure the muscles of a student travelling on an Arriva Trains Wales service from Manchester Piccadilly to Colwyn Bay on 11 October 2013. Arobieke, representing himself, denied the offence and claimed he was set up by the police because of his notoriety, but was convicted by a unanimous jury. He also complained about the use of the nickname "Purple Aki" throughout prosecution papers, as he regarded it as racist. Arobieke had previously complained to the Press Complaints Commission on these grounds, regarding newspaper use of the nickname.

In May 2016, Manchester Crown Court lifted the Prevention Order. In rendering his decision, Judge Richard Mansell indicated that while breaching the order was a "serious matter", the order's restrictions could "no longer be justified" as "none of the recent complainants had formed the slightest impression that Arobieke had derived sexual gratification from their muscles" and, unlike earlier incidents, the victims "hadn't suffered physical or psychological harm".

== Racial discrimination ==
The 1986 conviction of involuntary manslaughter was overturned a year later, and Arobieke was awarded an estimated £35,000 in compensation due to alleged racial overtones in the prosecution case. There was no evidence that Arobieke had threatened or touched Kelly, and three judges ruled that his mere presence at the station was not an unlawful act of harm.

After his hearing in 2008, Arobieke explained that psychiatric counselling had helped him realise that "if I am towering over them, and I am a big black man, they may not be really consenting, they may be consenting out of fear".

In August 2013, after being cleared of breaching his SOPO, Arobieke told the court he was the victim of a "modern-day witch hunt" and noted that officers had approached one alleged victim at his home rather than waiting for him to come forward. Arobieke had been arrested after being spotted by Detective Inspector Lewis Hughes while off-duty at the Manchester event. In a call to a police operator, DI Hughes said: "There's a famous paedophile here", and then referred to Arobieke by his nickname before adding: "His real name is quite a lengthy Nigerian name. He's very famous ... He's here accosting people in the toilets. As far as I know he's got bail conditions that prevent him from attending this sort of event." He was then held in prison for six weeks before being released. In 2014, Arobieke sued Merseyside and Greater Manchester Police (GMP) over his treatment, noting that he had almost two years in jail awaiting charges that were either dropped or of which he was acquitted.

A GMP Professional Standards investigation found two senior officers were given "words of advice" over their handling of an earlier complaint by Arobieke against DI Hughes. That complaint, which police failed to deal with correctly, was later to form part of a charge against Arobieke of harassing DI Hughes and the case collapsed after the 28-year-old detective acted in what the investigation described as an "unacceptable and unprofessional" manner outside court.

On 23 January 2014, the findings of the investigation were released and include a number of complaints that were rejected but three that were upheld. One of the upheld complaints by Arobieke alleged that during a visit to GMP headquarters on 9 December 2013, a staff member "came from behind the counter and confronted him in a threatening manner". The report said CCTV was viewed and "the conduct of the counter clerk was overly confrontational and likely to cause offence". The staff member had "been formally advised about his conduct".

In 2016, police began investigating an allegation against the BBC of incitement to racial hatred after Arobieke complained that the 2016 documentary The Man Who Squeezes Muscles: Searching for Purple Aki was racist. In the film, he is referred to as a "big black man" three times, and it is said that "everyone has seen him or been chased by him" and "everyone thinks they have spotted him and felt a shiver". One alleged victim in the documentary calls Arobieke "purple and huge".

In 2017, Solita Bar and Grill, which owned four restaurants in Manchester, apologised for naming a burger "Purple Teriyaki" in reference to Arobieke's nickname, after complaints that the name could be construed as racist. The restaurant had posted the name on Twitter with a photo of a sign which included an arm squeezing a bicep.

In November 2021, newspapers reported on a social media video which showed youths throwing fireworks at Arobieke on a street in Wavertree, Liverpool.

== Civil case against Greater Manchester Police ==
On 16 June 2022, Arobieke was awarded a substantial but undisclosed sum in settlement of a civil case he brought against GMP for malicious prosecution and misfeasance in public office. Arobieke alleged that, from 2012, he was targeted by two particular officers, who were not named. His case was that the officers made false allegations against him which ultimately resulted in him being charged and prosecuted.

== Death ==
Arobieke was found dead in his flat in Toxteth, Liverpool, on 26 August 2025, aged 64. Merseyside Police confirmed that officers were called to his address at around 8:30 that evening, where Arobieke was discovered unresponsive and pronounced dead at the scene. The death was not being treated as suspicious.
