= Seacombe railway station =

Former railway station on the Wirral Railway in Wirral, England

Coordinates: 53.4099°N 3.0194°W

Seacombe
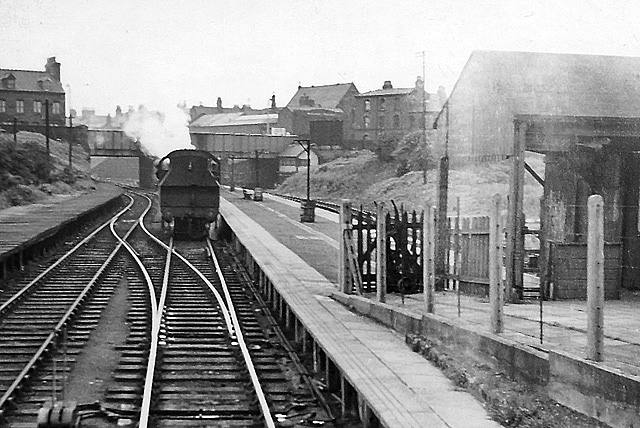
- The station in 1959

General information
- Location: Wallasey, Wirral; England
- Grid reference: SJ323908
- Platforms: 3

Other information
- Status: Disused

History
- Original company: Wirral Railway
- Post-grouping: LMS

Key dates
- 1 June 1895: opened
- 4 January 1960: passenger service withdrawn
- 16 June 1963: closed completely
Location

Seacombe railway station was located in Wallasey, Wirral, England. The station was opened by the Wirral Railway in 1895 and closed in 1963.

== History ==
The station was the terminus of a small branch line that ran from Seacombe Junction to opposite the ferry terminal at Seacombe, adjacent to the River Mersey. It was opened on 1 June 1895 as part of the Wirral Railway, with only one other station (Liscard and Poulton) on the stretch of line. The station's single platform was largely of timber construction with a small wooden waiting shelter near the exit. An additional platform was on the site, but was never used as the adjacent line was for the turning round of steam locomotives. The station buildings were constructed of corrugated iron. This was intended as a temporary measure, pending the building of a more permanent station adjoining the ferry terminal.

On 1 July 1901 Seacombe became Seacombe & Egremont, then reverted to its original name on 5 January 1953. The station saw regular passenger trips to Birkenhead, New Brighton and Chester with occasional specials to Wrexham and West Kirby. However, the line was more focused on goods rather than passengers, so when the majority of the Wirral Railway was electrified in 1938 the Seacombe branch was omitted. Passenger services ended on 4 January 1960, although goods services continued for three further years until the station closed completely on 16 June 1963.

== Since closure ==
The cutting in which the line was situated is now the approach road to the Kingsway (Wallasey) Tunnel. Traces of the immediate approach to the station can be found at the rear of the supermarket car park in the form of bridge stonework and a small section of sandstone wall.

Preceding station	Disused railways	Following station
Terminus	London, Midland and Scottish Railway; Wirral Railway	Liscard and Poulton; Line and station closed
