= Wallasey pub shooting =

2022 mass shooting in England

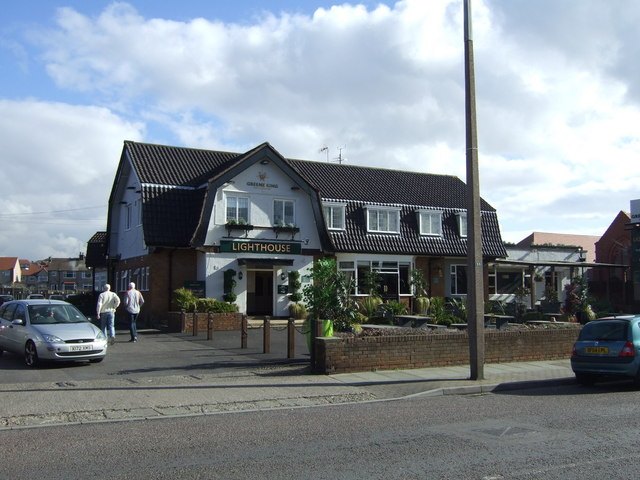
- The pub where the shooting occurred pictured in 2014

- Location of the shooting within Merseyside
- Location: 53.4271°N 3.0669°W; Wallasey Village, Wallasey, Merseyside, England
- Date: 24 December 2022; 23:50 (GMT)
- Attack type: Mass shooting
- Weapon: Skorpion submachine gun
- Deaths: 1
- Injuries: 5
- Verdict: Life imprisonment (minimum term 48 years); 9 years' imprisonment
- Convicted: Connor Chapman; Thomas Waring

On the evening of 24 December 2022, one person was killed and five others were injured in a mass shooting at the Lighthouse pub in Wallasey, Merseyside, England. The perpetrator, 22-year-old Connor Chapman, was sentenced to life imprisonment for murder with a minimum term of 48 years; it is not believed that the victim was targeted.

== Shooting ==
Shortly after 23:50 on 24 December 2022, Merseyside Police were called to the Lighthouse Inn in Wallasey Village following reports of gunshots. Police said that a gunman fired several shots towards the front entrance of the pub, which was packed with mostly young people at the time.

A 26-year-old woman, named as Elle Edwards, was taken to Arrowe Park Hospital after she suffered a serious gunshot injury to her head, and died shortly after. Four other men were also taken to hospital with gunshot wounds, one of whom, a 28-year-old man, was in critical condition. On 30 December, police said that the condition of the man critically hurt in the shooting was no longer life-threatening, and that the other three injured had been released from hospital.

== Investigation ==
Early on 25 December 2022, the day after the shooting, Merseyside Police confirmed that a murder investigation was underway to establish the circumstances of what had taken place. They also said that a cordon had been established in the area whilst officers carry out witness enquiries and examine any CCTV footage.

Detective Superintendent Dave McCaughrean said that they believe the gunman left the pub car park in a dark-coloured vehicle, possibly a Mercedes, shortly after the shooting.

He also appealed to members of the public and anyone who was in the pub at the time of the shooting to come forward with information, saying "I would ask anyone who was in the Lighthouse in Wallasey Village last night who witnessed the incident or has mobile or CCTV footage of what happened to contact us as a matter of urgency."

Police have said they do not believe the woman who was killed was targeted. She was later named by police as 26-year-old Elle Edwards, a beautician who worked 4 km (2.5 mi) away from the pub in Moreton.

On 26 December 2022, police arrested two people and took them into custody over the shooting. A 19-year-old woman from Rock Ferry was arrested on suspicion of conspiracy to murder, whilst a 30-year-old man from Tranmere was arrested on suspicion of murder and attempted murder. Police said that the investigation remained ongoing.

On 29 December 2022, police said they had arrested a third person, a 31-year-old man from Tranmere, in connection with the murder and had taken him into custody on suspicion of conspiracy to murder. They also said that the other two people who had been arrested remained in custody.

On 30 December 2022, police said that the 19-year-old woman who had been arrested was bailed and that the 30-year-old man was recalled to prison on licence. The 31-year-old man remained in custody, and police said enquiries into the shooting remain ongoing.

On 31 December 2022, it was said that the 31-year-old man who was arrested a couple of days earlier had been released on bail.

On 3 January 2023 it was reported by Merseyside Police that almost 150 pieces of intelligence had been received from the public in relation to the shooting.

On 11 January 2023, police said that a 22-year-old man was arrested on suspicion of murder following enquiries in mid-Wales, as well as a 23-year-old woman arrested on suspicion of assisting an offender; both were from the Wirral. These arrests brought the total number of people arrested in connection to the shooting to five.

Early on 13 January 2023, police said that the 22-year-old man, Connor Chapman, had been charged with the murder of Edwards. He had also been charged with two counts of attempted murder, three counts of unlawful and malicious wounding with intent to do grievous bodily harm, possession of a firearm with intent to endanger life, possession of ammunition with intent to endanger life, and handling stolen goods, namely a Mercedes A Class. He was due to appear at Wirral Adult Remand Court later in the day. The 23-year-old woman was released on bail. The police also said that the investigation was still ongoing.

Honorary Recorder of Liverpool, Judge Andrew Menary KC, remanded Chapman in custody to appear for a plea and trial preparation hearing on 17 April 2023. Chapman was due to stand trial for nine offences related to the shooting, including murder and possession of a submachine gun, with a fixed date of 7 June 2023.

On 6 April 2023, Chapman appeared at Liverpool Crown Court via videolink and pleaded not guilty to all the charges. A second man, Thomas Waring, also pleaded not guilty to possession of a firearm and assisting an offender by helping dispose of a car allegedly used by Chapman after the shooting. They were remanded into custody and a trial was scheduled to begin on 12 June 2023.

== Trial ==
On 13 June 2023, the trial for Connor Chapman began at Liverpool Crown Court before Mr Justice Goose, with Nigel Power KC as the prosecutor. The trial was attended by about 12 members of Edwards' family. Power said that Chapman was the shooter and that he had injured his two planned targets. He also said that Edwards was out with her friends when she went out for a cigarette shortly before midnight.

CCTV footage showed a man, who Power identified as Chapman, walking the car park before he opened fire on a group, which included Edwards. The court was told Chapman used a Škorpion sub-machine gun in the shooting and that he had injured six people, one fatally. Power said that Jake Duffey and Kieran Salkeld, who were both injured, were Chapman's targets for the shooting.

He said that after the shooting, Chapman drove a stolen Mercedes to a home in Barnston which belonged to his friend and co-defendant, 20-year-old Thomas Waring. In CCTV footage shown to the court, Chapman was seen walking towards the house when he ruffled his long hair causing the gun to dislodge and drop to the floor before he picked it up.

Power said the shooting followed history between rival groups from two estates on either sides of the M53 motorway. He outlined a series of events, including injunctions preventing Chapman associating with individuals including Duffey and Salkeld. He also spoke of a burglary and two shootings, which happened in November and December respectively. The court heard that on 23 December, the day before the shooting, Duffey and Salkeld had assaulted Sam Searson who was from the rival estate.

Chapman denied murder, two counts of attempted murder, three of wounding with intent, and one of both possession of a firearm and possession of ammunition. Waring denied possession of a prohibited weapon and assisting an offender. Footage was then replayed which showed Chapman in the area for three hours before seeing his target outside the pub, followed by him hurrying across the car park before opening fire on the group. In the footage Edwards could be seen collapsing on top of Salkeld following two gunshots to her head.

An autopsy showed Edwards had suffered unsurvivable injuries, and Power said DNA evidence was found which linked Chapman to a bullet casing found at the scene.

On 6 July, following the 24-day trial, Chapman was found guilty of the murder of Elle Edwards after the jury deliberated for three hours and 48 minutes. Waring was also found guilty of the possession of a prohibited firearm and assisting an offender. Chapman was also found guilty of attempted murder; one count of assault occasioning actual bodily harm; two counts of wounding with intent to cause grievous bodily harm; and possession of a gun and ammunition.

On 7 July, Chapman was sentenced to life imprisonment with a minimum term of 48 years. Waring was also sentenced to nine years in prison. With the 176 days served on remand taken into account, Chapman is set to remain in prison until the end of 2070, when he will be 70 years old. On 14 November 2024, it was reported that Waring would be released early from his sentence due to "significant problems with the prison population".

On 21 December 2023, it was reported that four more people had been charged with assisting an offender in relation to the shooting. They included two men aged 42 and 54 along with two women both aged 33. They appeared before Wirral Magistrates' Court on 15 January 2024 and were bailed ahead of another hearing at Liverpool Crown Court on 12 February 2024. On 12 February 2024, all four of the defendants pleaded not guilty to the charge against them at Liverpool Crown Court. A trial date was set for 2 September 2024 and they were given conditional bail ahead of a pre-trial hearing on 3 June 2024. On 6 November 2024, following a four-week trial at Liverpool Crown Court, all four of the defendants were found not guilty of assisting an offender.

== Reactions ==
Wallasey MP Dame Angela Eagle tweeted: "This is heartbreaking news – My thoughts are with the family of the woman who has died & those who are injured." She also appealed to the public to inform the police if they had any information about the shooting.

Wirral Council leader Janette Williamson said the shooting was "nothing less than despicable".

The pub where the shooting occurred was closed on 25 January 2023, one month after the shooting, as a mark of respect, with flowers being left at the entrance.

== Aftermath ==
An inquest, chaired by Anita Bhardwaj, Area Coroner for Liverpool and Wirral, was opened on 5 January 2023, and adjourned until 5 May following a brief hearing.

Edwards' funeral was held at St Nicholas Church, Wallasey on 25 January, and attended by several hundred mourners.

A foundation to tackle gun violence, the Elle Edwards Foundation, was established in her memory by her father. Following Chapman's conviction, Tim Edwards said it would become his mission to end gun violence in Merseyside.
