= Wallasey Village =

District and suburb of Wallasey, England

Coordinates: 53.4233°N 3.065°W

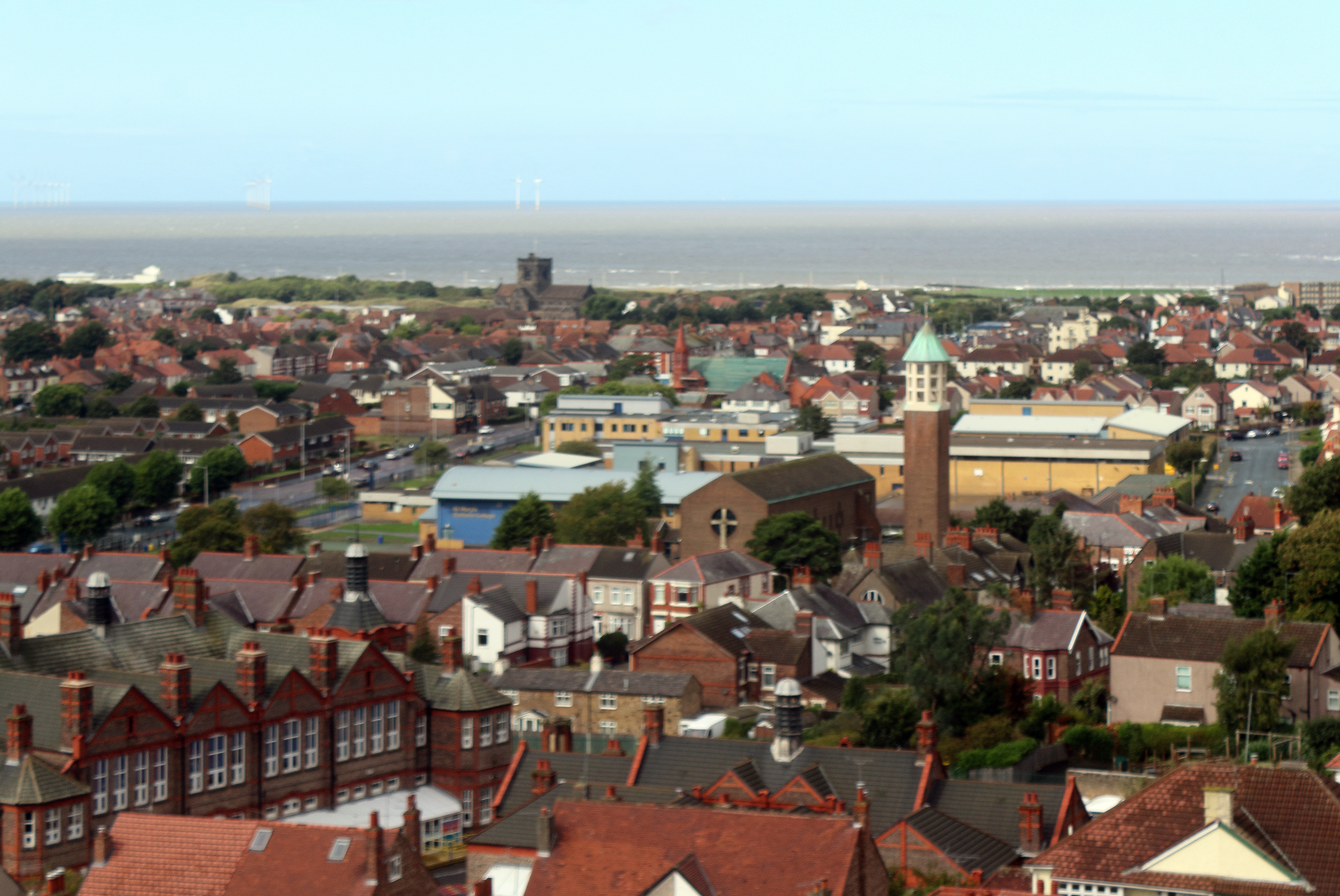
- Aerial view towards the village with St Nicholas' Church in the distance

- Location within Merseyside
- Population: 8,550 (2001 Census)
- OS grid reference: SJ293923
  - London: 181 mi (291 km) SE
- Metropolitan borough: Wirral
- Metropolitan county: Merseyside
- Region: North West
- Country: England
- Sovereign state: United Kingdom
- Post town: WALLASEY
- Postcode district: CH44
- Dialling code: 0151
- ISO 3166 code: GB-WRL
- Police: Merseyside
- Fire: Merseyside
- Ambulance: North West
- UK Parliament: Wallasey

Wallasey Village is a district and suburb of Wallasey, in the Metropolitan Borough of Wirral, England. At the 2001 Census the population of the area was 8,550.

Wallasey Village is the most westerly suburb of Wallasey and borders the other suburbs of New Brighton to the north east, Liscard to the east and Poulton to the south east. Further west is Leasowe, and to the north, beyond Harrison Park, is the King's Parade fronting Liverpool Bay. The Wirral Show used to be held on the extensive grassed areas - known as "the Dips" along this promenade, to the west of New Brighton.

== History ==
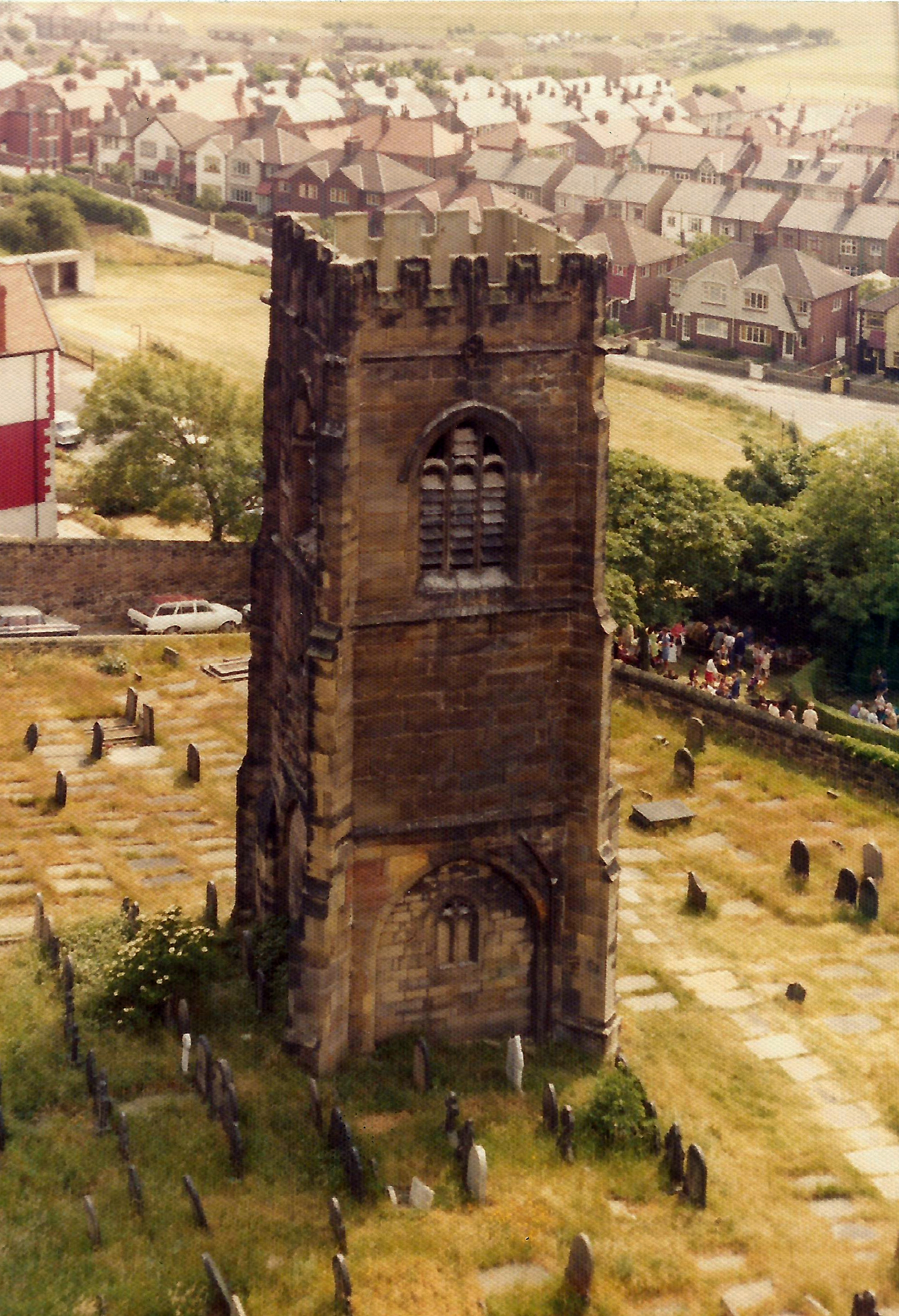
The Old Church Tower

St Hilary's Church may date back to the earliest days of Christianity in Britain. There are just eight churches in Britain named after the Bishop of Poitiers, St. Hilary, who contributed to the First Council of Nicaea in 325 AD, and it is thought that they were founded by St Germanus, who was invited from France as a missionary by the 5th-century English church. The tower is all that remains of a later church, which was built in 1530 but destroyed by fire in 1857: by the time someone had raced to Birkenhead to alert the fire brigade, and they had harnessed the horses to the fire tenders and galloped back to Wallasey, little remained of the church apart from a charred shell and the tower.

Until about the 15th century, the village was generally known as Kirkby in Walley. The name derives from the Norse words meaning "village with a church", and Walea, the Anglo-Saxon name for Wallasey as recorded in the Domesday Book. The village of West Kirby (or Kirkby) was so named to differentiate it from this Kirkby.

On 24 December 2022, a gunman killed a woman and injured four men in a mass shooting at a pub in Wallasey Village.

== Geography ==
Wallasey Village is situated in the north-east of the Wirral Peninsula, adjoining the Irish Sea to the north-west of the area. The area is less than 3 mi (4.8 km) west-south-west of the River Mersey at New Brighton and 10 mi (16 km) east-north-east of the Dee Estuary at Hoylake. The centre of Wallasey Village is at an elevation of around 12 m (39 ft) above sea level.

== Community ==
Wallasey Village is a largely residential area with various shops and pubs along the central road, Wallasey Village (road), with some extending along the eastern end of Leasowe Road.

Wallasey Village forms part of Metropolitan Borough of Wirral's Wallasey ward and is represented by Conservative Party Councillors: Lesley Rennie and Ian Lewis. The most recent local elections took place in 2023, when Lesley Rennie and Ian Lewis were re-elected with the highest votes of any Conservative candidate in the North West.

== Transport ==
There are two railway stations within this area: Wallasey Village and Wallasey Grove Road.
