= Wallasey Grove Road railway station =

Railway station serving Wallasey, Wirral, Merseyside, England

Coordinates: 53.428°N 3.070°W

Wallasey Grove Road
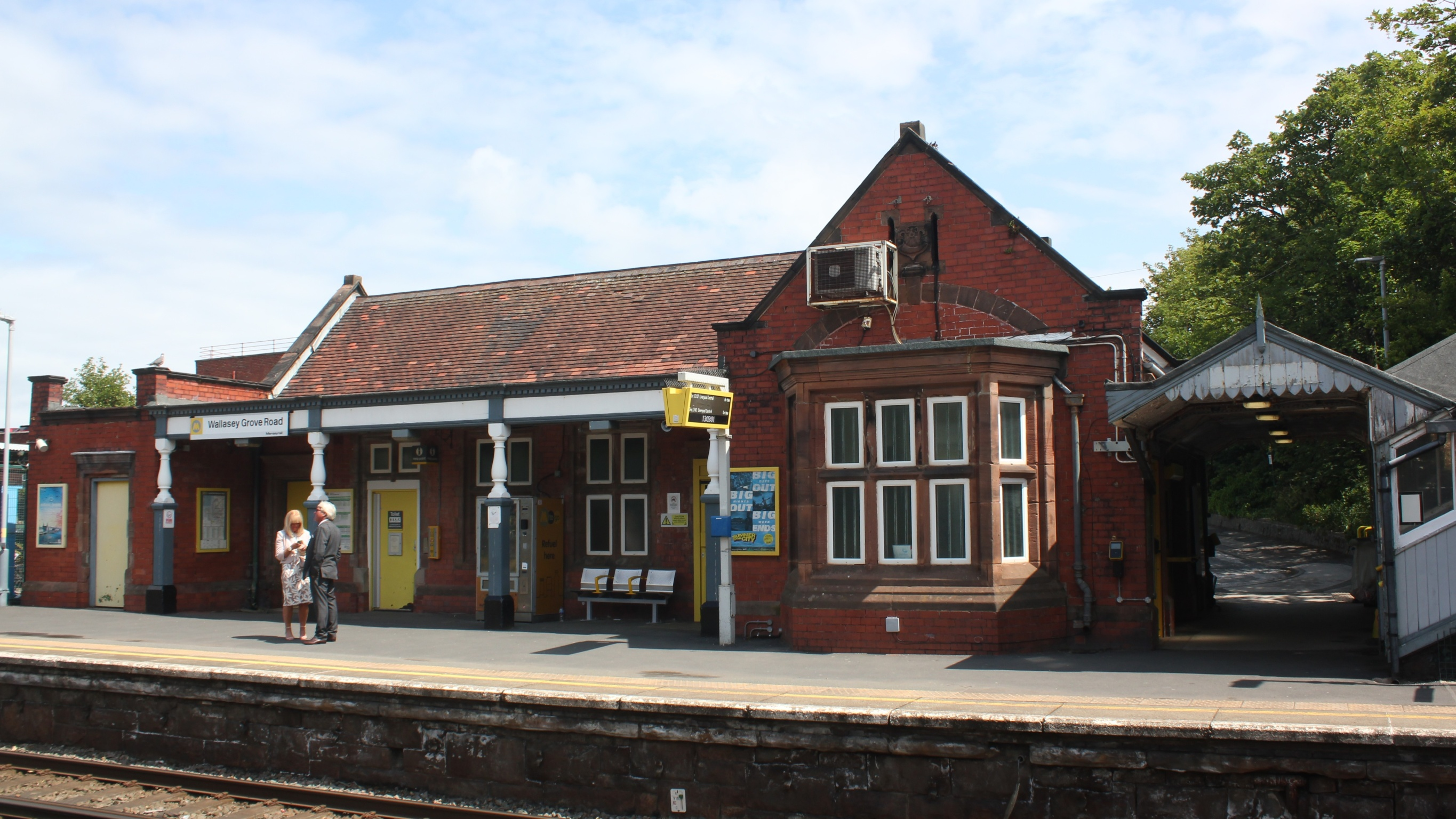
- The eastbound platform at Wallasey Grove Road

General information
- Location: Wallasey, Wirral; England
- Grid reference: SJ290929
- Manager: Merseyrail
- Transit authority: Merseytravel
- Platforms: 2

Other information
- Station code: WLG
- Fare zone: B1
- Classification: DfT category E

Key dates
- 1888: Opened as Wallasey
- 1938: Electrified
- 31 May 1948: Renamed as Wallasey Grove Road

Passengers
- 2021/22: ▲0.389 million
- 2022/23: ▲0.441 million
- 2023/24: ▲0.485 million
- 2024/25: ▲0.499 million
- 2025/26: ▲0.557 million
Location
Notes
- Passenger statistics from the Office of Rail and Road

Wallasey Grove Road railway station serves the town of Wallasey in Merseyside, England. It is situated on the Wirral Line 6 1/2 miles (10.5 km) west of Liverpool Lime Street on the Merseyrail network.

== History ==
The station was built on the Wirral Railway's route from Birkenhead Park to New Brighton, opening as a temporary terminus from 2 January to 30 March 1888. Through services via the Mersey Railway Tunnel to Liverpool commenced in 1938, when the London Midland and Scottish Railway electrified the line.

== Facilities ==
The station is staffed, during all opening hours, and has platform CCTV. There is a payphone, a vending machine and a waiting room on platform 1, a booking office, live departure and arrival screens, for passenger information, and each of the two platforms also has a further sheltered waiting area. The station has a free "Park and Ride" car park with 168 spaces, a drop-off point, a cycle rack with six spaces and secure storage for 20 cycles. Both platforms can be easily accessed by separate entrances, which are a 250 metres (270 yd) walk apart, without the use of staircases. However, there is no easier access, cross-platform, for passengers with wheelchairs or prams, as other access is by staircase only.

== Services ==
Current service levels are every 15 minutes to Liverpool and New Brighton during Monday to Saturday daytime, and every 30 minutes at other times. These services are all provided by Merseyrail's fleet of Class 777 EMUs.

Wallasey Grove Road has been adopted by the Edible Wirral Partnership for the growing of fresh fruits and vegetables on the station's platforms.

Preceding station	National Rail	Following station
New Brighton	Merseyrail; Wirral Line; New Brighton Branch	Wallasey Village
	Historical railways	
Warren; Line open, station closed	London, Midland and Scottish Railway; Wirral Railway	Wallasey Village; Line and station open
