= New Brighton railway station =

Railway station serving New Brighton in Merseyside, England

Coordinates: 53.437°N 3.049°W

New Brighton
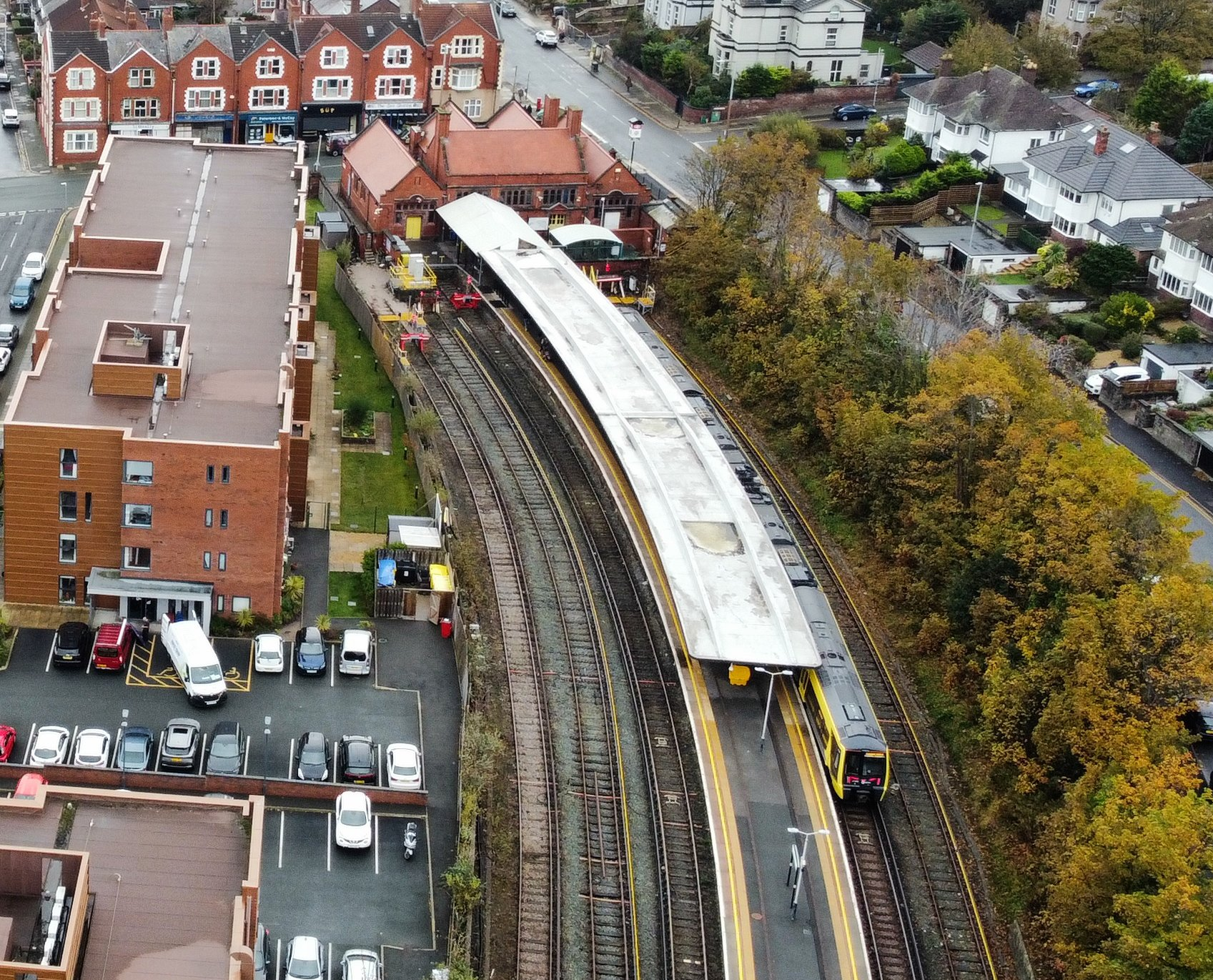
- Overhead view of New Brighton station, with a Class 777 at the platform.

General information
- Location: New Brighton, Wirral; England
- Grid reference: SJ304939
- Manager: Merseyrail
- Transit authority: Merseytravel
- Platforms: 2

Other information
- Station code: NBN
- Fare zone: B1
- Classification: DfT category E

Key dates
- 1888: Opened
- 1938: Electrified

Passengers
- 2021/22: ▲0.897 million
- 2022/23: ▲0.932 million
- 2023/24: ▲0.994 million
- 2024/25: ▲1.192 million
- 2025/26: ▲1.341 million
Location
Notes
- Passenger statistics from the Office of Rail and Road

New Brighton on the Wirral Line

New Brighton railway station serves the suburb of New Brighton in Wallasey, Merseyside, England. It is situated at the end of the New Brighton branch of the Wirral Line 8.25 miles (13.28 km) west of Liverpool Lime Street on the Merseyrail network.

== History ==
The station was built as the terminus of the Wirral Railway's route from Birkenhead Park station, opening in 1888. Through services via the Mersey Railway Tunnel to Liverpool commenced in 1938, when the London Midland and Scottish Railway electrified the line. The station had a goods yard, which closed on 30 October 1965.

Between 1960 and 1971, diesel services on the Borderlands Wrexham to Bidston line ran through to New Brighton. This arrangement started when the service was converted to diesel trains and the branch to Seacombe station which was used as the terminus in North Wirral was closed. The service on the last leg from Bidston to New Brighton was very little used, apart from on peak summer days, as most passengers from the west of the Wirral and North Wales were heading for Liverpool or Birkenhead. From 4 January 1971, the service was terminated at Birkenhead North and, from 2 October 1978, the terminus was cut back one more station to Bidston.

From 1960, there was a direct diesel service from Chester Northgate station to New Brighton using mainly the Borderlands Line. The service ceased on 9 September 1968, before the closure of Northgate station. The diesel trains normally used the northern face of the island platform at New Brighton, with the electric services using the southern face.

In 1983, work started on converting the old station master's house into a music recording studio. The studio opened for business in 1985 and was called Station House Studios.

=== Accidents and incidents ===
In 1986, Gary Kelly, a 16-year-old boy, died from electrocution at the station after fleeing from Akinwale Arobieke, known locally as Purple Aki, who was believed to have been intimidating him. Arobieke was convicted of manslaughter, but the conviction was quashed on appeal after it was ruled that Arobieke had committed no crime in "standing and looking into trains".

== Facilities ==
The station is staffed, during all opening hours, and has platform CCTV. There is a payphone, a station cafe and a vending machine, as well as a waiting room and toilets. There is, also, a booking office, live departure and arrival screens, for passenger information, and the terminus island platform also has a further sheltered waiting area. The station has a drop-off point, and a cycle rack with four spaces and secure cycle storage for 10 cycles. The station has car parking for three vehicles. Both platforms and the ticket office are fully accessible to wheelchair users.

== Services ==
Current service levels are every 15 minutes to Liverpool during Monday to Saturday daytime, and every 30 minutes at other times. These services are all provided by Merseyrail's fleet of Class 777 EMUs.

Preceding station	National Rail	Following station
Terminus	Merseyrail; Wirral Line; New Brighton Branch	Wallasey Grove Road towards Liverpool Central
	Historical railways	
Terminus	London, Midland and Scottish Railway; Wirral Railway	Warren; Line open, station closed

== Bibliography ==
- Maund, T.B. (2009). The Wirral Railway and its Predecessors. Gloucestershire: Lightmoor Press. ISBN 978-1-899-88938-9.
- Mitchell, Vic; Smith, Keith (2013). Wrexham to New Brighton. West Sussex: Middleton Press. ISBN 9781908174475. OCLC 859543196.
