= Wirral Railway =

Former railway network in Wirral, England

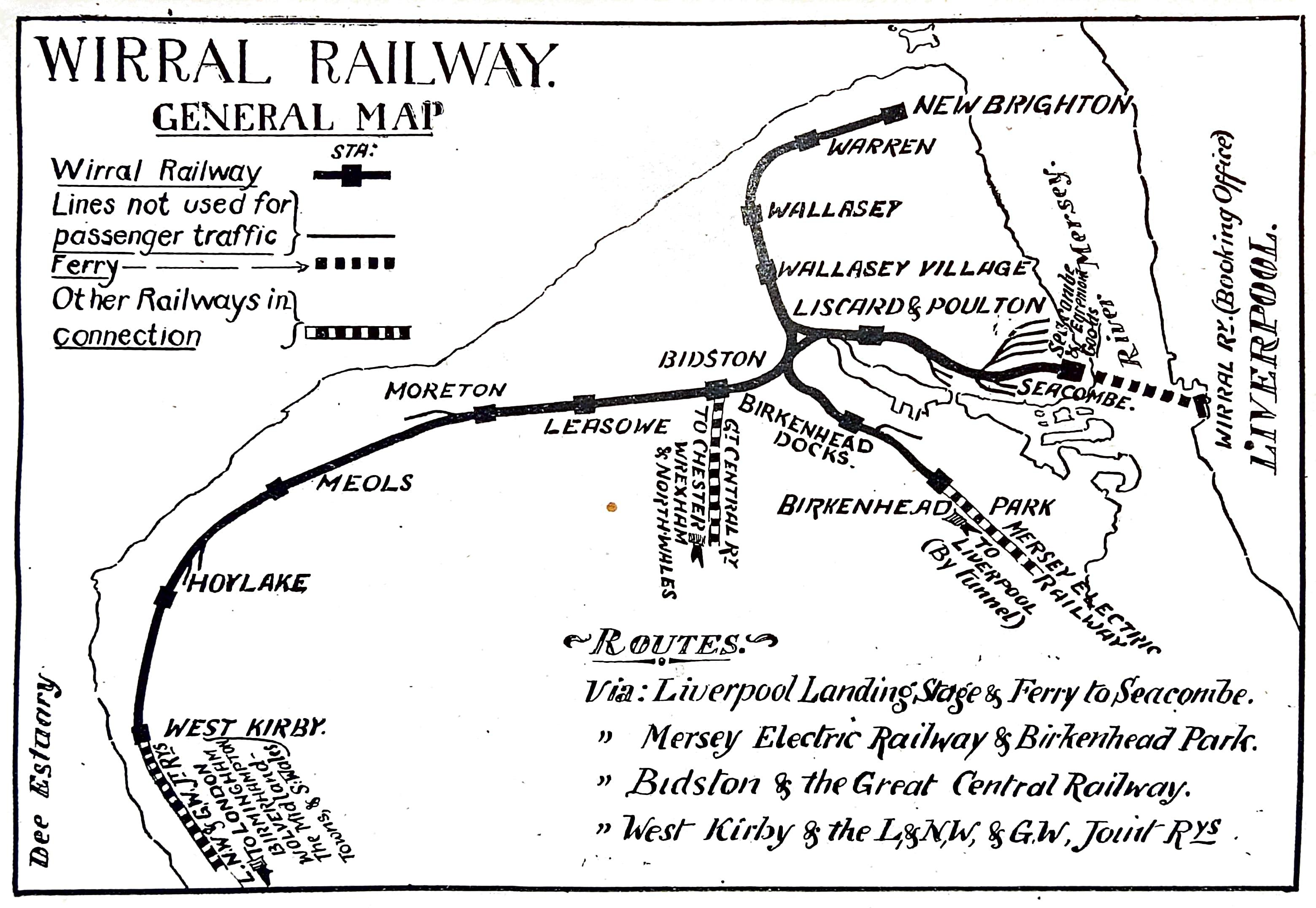
- 1920 map of the railway

Technical
- Track gauge: 4 ft 8 1/2 in (1,435 mm)
- Length: 13 miles 5 1/4 chains (21.03 km) (1919)
- Track length: 40 miles 19 chains (64.8 km) (1919)

The Wirral Railway was a railway network in the northern part of the Wirral Peninsula, England. Its route was from Birkenhead Park in the east of the Wirral to West Kirby in the west. A branch off this line at Bidston went north to Seacombe and New Brighton. It was incorporated in 1863 as the Hoylake Railway, running from Hoylake to Birkenhead Docks. After changes of name and of ownership, it was purchased by the Wirral Railway Company Limited in 1884. The network was extended to West Kirby, New Brighton, and Seacombe, and to Birkenhead Park station where it joined the Mersey Railway, enabling through trains through the Mersey Railway Tunnel to Liverpool. In the 1923 grouping the Wirral company became part of the London, Midland and Scottish Railway, which electrified the lines (except the Seacombe branch) in 1938, allowing passenger services to be integrated with the Liverpool urban system. Most of the Wirral Railway network is still in use today as part of the Wirral Line of the Merseyrail rail network.

== Hoylake Railway ==
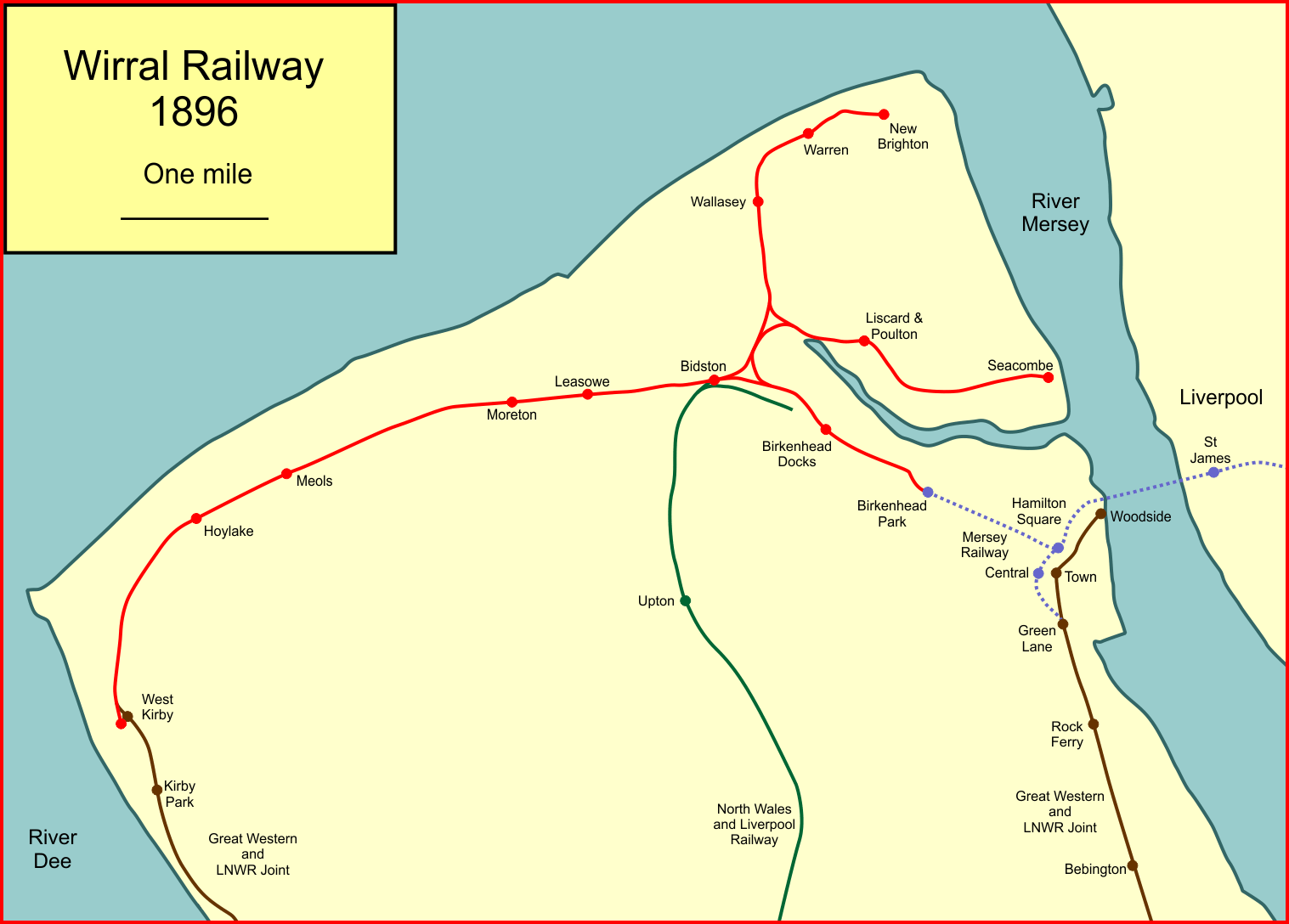
System map of the Wirral Railway

The Chester and Birkenhead Railway opened on 23 September 1840. (Note: Gahan; Maund says 22 September on page 6.) This was the first penetration of the Wirral by a railway, and for some years no further attempt was made to build in the peninsula.

Hoylake Railway Act 1863
- Act of Parliament
- Parliament of the United Kingdom
- Long title: An Act for making and maintaining Railways from Birkenhead and Poulton-cum-Seacombe to Hoylake in the County of Chester.
- Citation: 26 & 27 Vict. c. ccvii

Dates
- Royal assent: 28 July 1863

Text of statute as originally enacted

Observing the success of the Liverpool, Crosby and Southport Railway in encouraging residential building, and travel, a group of business people led by Braithwaite Pool, a career railwayman, proposed a railway, to be called the Hoylake Railway. It was to connect Hoylake with Birkenhead. The route was soon modified to connect Seacombe (instead of Birkenhead) to Hoylake, with a branch from Bidston to Wallasey Bridge Road to serve Birkenhead docks. An act of Parliament, the Hoylake Railway Act 1863 (26 & 27 Vict. c. ccvii) giving powers to build the railway was obtained on 28 July 1863. Authorised capital was £100,000 with £33,000 in permitted borrowing.

The Hoylake company deposited further bills in quick succession, showing a desire to reach far beyond the initial area and break the Great Western Railway (GWR) and London and North Western Railway (LNWR) duopoly in the Wirral; these proposals included a long viaduct over the River Dee to Mostyn. All the bills were heavily cut back or rejected.

In the event the Seacombe portion of the line was not built at this stage as it would have been particularly expensive. Accordingly, the railway was constructed as a single line from Hoylake to Wallasey Bridge Road only, a distance of just over five miles. It was inspected by Captain Ritchie of the Board of Trade on 16 June 1866 and was opened to traffic on Monday 18 June 1866. However this apparently did not result in a regular train service until 2 July 1866, following a further inspection by Ritchie on that date. There were six trains a day, four on Sundays, running from "Birkenhead Docks" (i.e. Wallasey Bridge Road) to Hoylake; an omnibus connection was operate to Seacombe.

"All the stations were of the most elementary type, having cinder platforms very scantily supplied with buildings, a state of affairs which in the case of the intermediate stations has persisted to the time of electrification."

== Financial performance ==
Although passenger business was very brisk at first, this soon tailed off and the financial performance of the company was very poor, and the train service was reduced.

Robinson wrote:

"The building of the line was premature, however. Hoylake in those days was a small fishing village and the rest of the coast quite undeveloped, and it was soon found that the traffic was too small to make it a paying concern.”

Money was also owing from the construction of the line, and a Mr Vyner of Bidston had not been paid for land the company had acquired from him; the debt was £9,000, which the company did not have at its disposal; indeed its other liabilities amounted to £20,000. He was able to arrange for bailiffs to seize part of the line at the eastern end of the network, and traffic had to be suspended.

It was reported:

Sale of a Railway: ln pursuance of a Chancery decree, obtained by Mr. Robert Vyner, who has never been paid for his land, that portion of the Birkenhead and Hoylake Railway which runs through his property, was offered for sale by auction at the Queen’s Hotel, Chester, on Saturday [18 September 1869]. One of the conditions of sale was that the purchaser was to pay, beyond his bid for the land, for everything found upon it a valuation made by the auctioneers, Messrs. Churton and Elphick. The solicitor representing the railway company protested against anything but the land being sold; but the auctioneer said he was acting under the authority of the Court of Chancery, and proceeded to put up the four "lots". The first lot was knocked down to Messrs. Roberts and Potts, Chester, for 4,000l, (Note: £4,000) the only bid; the lot including the Dock Cottages station, North Birkenhead (where the line commences), adjoining land, and the railway as far as lot two, which included the Bidston station, and a length beyond this lot being also knocked down to Mr. Roberts for 1,500l. (Note: £1,500) No offers were made for the other two lots. It was stated that Mr. Roberts was acting for Mr. Vyner.

— Morning Advertiser

In fact Vyner had bought back his own land, and generously did not force closure of the railway for some time. However he must have lost patience eventually, for on 30 June 1870 a writ of ejectment was secured for him, and the Hoylake Railway was required to remove all its movable assets from the affected land. The section of line westward from Leasowe to Hoylake, outside Vyner's area of interest, was kept in operation for the time being, from 8 July 1870. Road coaches provided connections from Leasowe level crossing, where there was no proper station, and Birkenhead and Seacombe.

== Hoylake and Birkenhead Rail and Tramway Company ==
Hoylake and Birkenhead Railway and Tramways Act 1872
- Act of Parliament
- Parliament of the United Kingdom
- Long title: An Act for the sale and transfer of the Undertaking of the Hoylake Railway Company, and for enabling the Hoylake and Birkenhead Tramway Company to make and maintain Tramways from the Hoylake Railway to Woodside Ferry and other places in Birkenhead, in the county of Chester; and for other purposes.
- Citation: 35 & 36 Vict. c. cxxvii

Dates
- Royal assent: 18 July 1872

A new company, the Hoylake and Birkenhead Tramway Company, was formed on 19 November 1870. Its objective may have been to acquire the Hoylake company's line and convert it to a tramway. It soon deposited a parliamentary bill to build a line from Woodside to Birkenhead Docks, but there proved to be procedural difficulties and the new company was dissolved by the Hoylake and Birkenhead Railway and Tramways Act 1872 (35 & 36 Vict. c. cxxvii) of 18 July 1872, when a new company, the Hoylake and Birkenhead Rail and Tramway Company was incorporated. It was authorised to operate street running tramways in Birkenhead, and to take over the assets and operation of the Hoylake Railway. It acquired the assets of the Hoylake Railway Company for £22,000 and settled the outstanding debt with Vyner. (Note: The Hoylake Railway Company was formally wound up in 1875.) The railway part of its operation was started on 1 August 1872, Vyner's part of the line evidently having been retained intact. In 1873 the company opened a street tramway between Wallasey Bridge Road and the Woodside ferry terminal in Birkenhead. This was of course horse-operated; it was sold on to the Birkenhead Tramways Company on 11 October 1879 under the Birkenhead Tramways Act 1879 (42 & 43 Vict. c. clxxxvi).

Hoylake and Birkenhead Rail and Tramway Act 1873
- Act of Parliament
- Parliament of the United Kingdom
- Long title: An Act to authorise the Hoylake and Birkenhead Rail and Tramway Company to extend their Railways; and for other purposes.
- Citation: 36 & 37 Vict. c. ccxxxix

Dates
- Royal assent: 5 August 1873

Text of statute as originally enacted

Seacombe, Hoylake and Dee Side Railway Act 1881
- Act of Parliament
- Parliament of the United Kingdom
- Long title: An Act to authorise the Hoylake and Birkenhead Rail and Tramway Company to extend their Railway to Seacombe; to change the name of the Company; and for other purposes.
- Citation: 44 & 45 Vict. c. cxv

Dates
- Royal assent: 18 July 1881

Text of statute as originally enacted

The company extended the railway line from Hoylake to West Kirby, authorised earlier by the Hoylake and Birkenhead Rail and Tramway Act 1873 (36 & 37 Vict. c. ccxxxix) and, at the other end of the system, also made the short connection between Wallasey Bridge Road and the docks. Both of these new sections were opened on 1 April 1878. Now concentrating on its railway operation, the company changed its name to the Seacombe, Hoylake and Deeside Railway, by an act of Parliament, the Seacombe, Hoylake and Dee Side Railway Act 1881 (44 & 45 Vict. c. cxv), of 18 July 1881.

== Wirral Railway ==
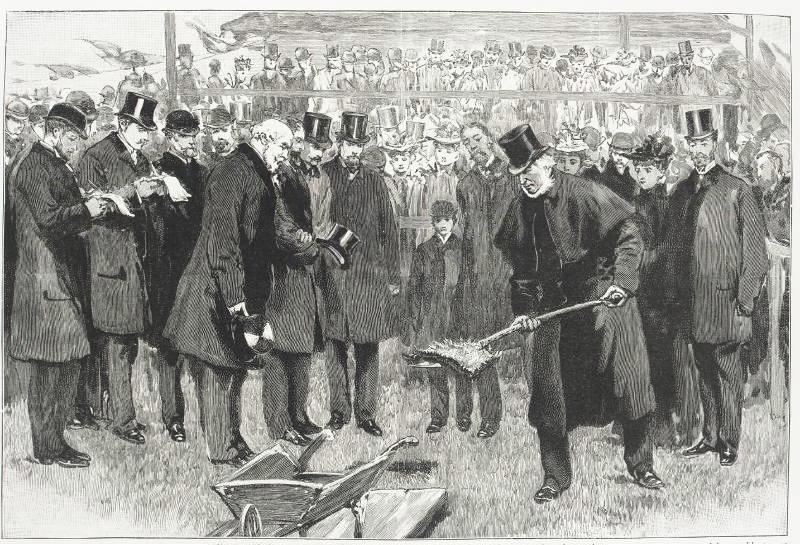
Cutting the first sod of the Wirral Railway

The Wirral Railway was incorporated on 13 June 1883; and given a certificate of authorisation by the Board of Trade under the Railways Construction Facilities Act 1864, the Wirral Railway Certificate 1883. It was to build a "Dee Extension" line from Bidston (on the Hoylake line) to Hawarden Bridge on the River Dee, and another line from the Birkenhead Central station of the Mersey Railway to Woodchurch. Woodchurch was a place on the Dee Extension a little south of the present-day Upton station on the Hawarden Bridge line.

In fact the Woodchurch line was not built; but on 14 August 1884 the company were authorised to build from Bidston to New Brighton.

== Wirral Railway Company Limited ==
Wirral Railway Act 1884
- Act of Parliament
- Parliament of the United Kingdom
- Long title: An Act to authorise the Wirral Railway Company to make a Branch Railway to Birkenhead and for other purposes.
- Citation: 47 & 48 Vict. c. ccliii

Dates
- Royal assent: 14 August 1884

Text of statute as originally enacted

Also authorised on 14 August 1884, by the Wirral Railway Act 1884 (47 & 48 Vict. c. ccliii) was a separate company, the Wirral Railway Company Limited. This new company was authorised to purchase the previous Wirral Railway Company as well as the Seacombe, Hoylake and Deeside Railway. Having acquired those companies, the WRC Ltd kept them in existence for the time being. In substitution for the cancelled Woodchurch line, the earlier Wirral Railway company had obtained powers to extend from near Wallasey Bridge Road to Birkenhead Park, joining the Mersey Railway there; there was to be an intermediate station at Birkenhead Docks. The Docks station was now constructed by the SH&DR and, with a short section of connecting line, opened on 2 January 1888, when Wallasey Bridge Road station was closed. The (original) Wirral Railway constructed the extension to Birkenhead Park, and that opened on the same day. The Mersey Railway had extended its own line to meet the Wirral at Birkenhead Park, and that extension too opened on 2 January 1888.

By this time, the train service had been increased to 22 each way on weekdays, 8 on Sundays. For a period, convenient changes of trains were provided at Birkenhead Park, but through trains were run from 1 May 1890. The Wirral engines did not have the power to climb the gradient in the Mersey Tunnel, nor condensing equipment, so the trains changed engines at Birkenhead Park. The through trains continued until 30 June 1894, when disagreements between the Wirral and Mersey companies led to a suspension of co-operation.

== New Brighton ==
Writing in 1914, Mercer observed that the Wirral had become known as "'The Dormitory of Liverpool' owing to the number of people who reside on the Cheshire side of the Mersey and travel across under the water daily to and from business." In addition, New Brighton had become a popular destination for trippers by steamer, but the railway transformed it into a residential town. The Wirral Railway extended from a triangular junction west of Birkenhead Docks to Wallasey, Grove Road. This too opened on 2 January 1888, and was completed as far as New Brighton on 30 March in the same year.

== Absorption of the SH&DR ==
Wirral Railway (Amalgamation) Act 1891
- Act of Parliament
- Parliament of the United Kingdom
- Long title: An Act for amalgamating the undertakings of the Wirral Railway Company and Seacombe Hoylake and Deeside Railway Company and for other purposes.
- Citation: 54 & 55 Vict. c. xxxv

Dates
- Royal assent: 11 June 1891

Text of statute as originally enacted

The Seacombe, Hoylake and Deeside Railway (SH&DR) had been wholly owned by the Wirral Railway Company Limited, and on 11 June 1891 it was fully absorbed by the Wirral Railway (Amalgamation) Act 1891 (54 & 55 Vict. c. xxxv). Construction to Seacombe itself was now undertaken; as this was a ferry terminal, heavy residential traffic was foreseen. Branching from the New Brighton line by another triangular junction, the Seacombe line was difficult in engineering terms, but it was opened on 1 June 1895. The hoped-for residential traffic did not develop as intended, with residential passengers preferring the convenience of travel by the Mersey Railway over a transfer to a ferry that could not convey them to the centre of Liverpool.

The eastern chord of the triangular junction with the New Brighton line was chiefly used by a summer passenger service between Seacombe and New Brighton, but by this time a direct tramway service was in operation, and this was found much more convenient. The train service was discontinued in 1911, and the east chord was closed and the rails sent to France during World War I.

== Main line improvements ==
The main line to West Kirby was single track, with passing places at Moreton and Hoylake after 1878. With increasing traffic volumes this became an operational difficulty, and the line was doubled as far as Hoylake in June 1895; Hoylake to West Kirby was doubled in 1896. The joint railway of the London and North Western Railway and the Great Western Railway had reached West Kirby, and there were discussions about the provision of a joint station there to include the Wirral operation; but these were inconclusive and separate stations were built. The Wirral rebuilt and extended its West Kirby station in 1898 - 1899.

== Hawarden Bridge line ==
Wirral Railway Transfer Act 1889
- Act of Parliament
- Parliament of the United Kingdom
- Long title: An Act to authorise the transfer of certain portions of the Undertaking of the Wirral Railway Company to the Manchester Sheffield and Lincolnshire and the Wrexham Mold and Connah's Quay Railway Companies and for other purposes.
- Citation: 52 & 53 Vict. c. cxxxiii

Dates
- Royal assent: 12 August 1889

Text of statute as originally enacted

The Wirral Railway had obtained powers for a "Dee Extension" in 1883, but this long route had been unaffordable. In 1889 the powers for construction were transferred to the Manchester, Sheffield and Lincolnshire Railway and the Wrexham, Mold and Connah's Quay Railway jointly. The line became known as the North Wales and Liverpool Railway and the transfer was authorised by the Wirral Railway Transfer Act 1889 (52 & 53 Vict. c. cxxxiii) of 12 May 1889. The Wirral Railway's interest in the line was at an end, but the MS&LR and the WM&CQR acquired running powers to Seacombe, which they later exercised. (The two companies became part of the London and North Eastern Railway under the "grouping" of the railways in 1923.)

== The 20th century ==
The train service was further increased in the first years of the twentieth century, amounting to 40 or so trains each way on the main line, with eight on Sundays. The New Brighton line had 37 each way, eight on Sundays, and the Seacombe line had 17 and 8 respectively.

Pursuant to the Railways Act 1921 ownership of most of the main line railways of Great Britain was transferred to one or other of four new large companies; the process was known as the "grouping". The Wirral Railway Company became part of the new London, Midland and Scottish Railway (LMS) at the beginning of 1923.

Writing in 1928, McNaught said

At present the only through connection to and from the Wirral section is represented by one or more through carriages running once daily in each direction between New Brighton and London (Euston). Instead of entering the terminal station at West Kirby, this train passes direct on to the joint line there, and is detached at Hooton to join a through express from Birkenhead (Woodside). This innovation has been very popular since its introduction in 1923, as the journey from Birkenhead to New Brighton, though only some 5 miles as the crow flies, is in actuality somewhat inconvenient, involving either the crossing of Birkenhead Docks by swing bridges, or a ferry trip to Liverpool landing stage, there changing to a Wallasey Corporation steamer, to complete the journey.

Since being taken over by the L.M.S., the Wirral line has been re-laid throughout, and comfortable modern rolling-stock placed in service. Train sets of eight vehicles, former L.N.W. and L. and Y. (Note: Lancashire and Yorkshire Railway) stock, are now used.

== Electrification ==
The Wirral Railway had been predominantly a passenger line, with a locomotive fleet consisting of tank engines. Electrification had been considered as early as 1900; Mercer reported in 1914 that the powers had been acquired; but no action was taken then. In 1936 the LMS decided that the time was right for electrification, and work was put in hand. Station modernisation and signalling improvements were incorporated into the scheme, but the Seacombe line was scheduled for closure.

Electric power was taken at 11 kV 50 Hz 3 phase from the Clarence Dock power station; the cables were laid through the Mersey Tunnel. The traction supply to the trains was at 650 V DC by third rail. Goods traffic continued to be steam hauled. 10 1/2 route miles of railway were electrified. It had been proposed to electrify at 1,500 v dc overhead, but this was technically impossible through the Mersey Tunnel, so the third rail system was adopted. The position of the third rail was the same as on the Watford New Line electrification, and required the Mersey Railway system to alter its third rail from 22 inches outside the running rail to 16 inches, and to fit duplicate collector shoes to its rolling stock.

The new rolling stock was in three-car units of which there were 19, with steel bodies and open saloon accommodation. They had air-operated sliding doors, and automatic couplers. There was one motor coach in each three car unit, and it was equipped with four 135 hp motors. Additional power was considered to be required for the steep gradients in the Mersey Tunnel. (Note: Compared with the 110 hp that would otherwise have been sufficient.) Electrical equipment was supplied by British Thomson-Houston, and the vehicles were manufactured by Metropolitan Carriage and Wagon Company and the Birmingham Railway Carriage and Wagon Company. The units later became British Rail Class 503.

Automatic notching was provided. (Note: At the time this was still a novelty.) When the trains were running in the Mersey Tunnel where there is a gradient of 1 in 27, provision was made to increase the notching point of the acceleration relay. This could be actuated by a sealed push-button in the driver's cab, for use in exceptional circumstances, such as a six-car train operating with one motor coach out of action. Tuplin wrote that the new vehicles did not have an on-board air compressor; at the end of the run:

the motorman emerged from his compartment with a hose, lifted an iron cover plate from a hole in the station platform and connected the hose to an underground air-supply line. Incredible though it may seem, there was no compressor on the train, but reliance was placed on periodic charging of a reservoir which fed air to the Westinghouse brakes and also to the Westinghouse electro-pneumatic controllers for the traction motors. When a satisfactory charge had been obtained, the motorman turned off the cocks on supply-pipe and reservoir, and pulled up the hose with a loud "sssh—ack" as the air in the hose escaped.

The Wirral line was operated on the third rail system but the Mersey Railway system was on fourth rail, so the new trains were fitted with negative contact shoes and a contactor which was automatically operated according to the system. This was considered to be a cheaper option than installing a fourth rail throughout the new Wirral electrified area. There was a 50-foot gap in the conductor rails at each end of the Birkenhead Park station: the only such changing point on any British Railway.

The new service was inaugurated on 13 March 1938, (Note: Sunday 13 March 1938, according to Gahan. Gillham gives 14 March 1938 on page 144.) with trains running through to Liverpool through the former Mersey Railway route, now also, of course part of the LMS. Trains ran every 15 minutes, enhanced to 10 minutes at the busiest times. The Seacombe branch passenger service was now exclusively operated by steam trains of the London and North Eastern Railway (as successor since 1923 to the Great Central Railway).

Through coaches from New Brighton to London had been inaugurated in 1923, one journey in each direction being made. When the New Brighton line was electrified, the London service continued at first, and was the only steam hauled passenger service on the New Brighton line. The coaches ran via West Kirby to Hooton, where they were attached to a main line train. The engine power was customarily a class 3F 0-6-0.

== After 1948 ==
On 1 January 1948 most of the railways of Great Britain were taken into national ownership under British Railways.

In the 1950s usage of the Seacombe branch declined steeply: both the goods traffic and passenger traffic diminished. The passenger service was withdrawn after the close of service on Sunday 3 January 1960. The branch was closed to all traffic on 17 June 1963. Some years later its route was used for the approach road to the Kingsway Tunnel that opened in 1971.

Bidston West to North curve closed officially on 28 November 1983, but the dominant traffic had been iron ore trains which ceased in 1980.

== Topography ==
- Birkenhead Park; Mersey Railway station; opened 2 January 1888; still open;
- Bidston East Junction;
- Bidston West Junction;
- Bidston; opened 2 July 1866; closed 8 July 1870; reopened 1 August 1872; still open; (Note: Mitchell and Smith (in "Wrexham to New Brighton") give opening 2 July 1866; closed 4 July 1870; reopened 1 August 1872; closed June 1890; reopened 18 May 1896 when it became a junction;)
- Bidston Dee Junction;
- Leasowe Crossing; opened 8 July 1870; closed 1 August 1872; reopened as Leasowe 5 May 1894; still open;
- Moreton; opened 2 July 1866; still open;
- Meols; opened 2 July 1866; still open;
- Manor Road; opened 26 May 1941; still open;
- Hoylake; opened 2 July 1866; still open;
- West Kirby; opened 1 April 1878; still open.
- Bidston East Junction;
- Bidston North Junction;
- Seacombe Junction No. 1;
- Seacombe Junction No. 3;
- Wallasey Village; opened March 1907; still open;
- Wallasey; opened 2 January 1888; renamed Wallasey Grove Road 31 May 1948; still open;
- Warren Halt; opened November 1888; closed 1 October 1915;
- New Brighton; opened 30 March 1888; still open.
- Seacombe Junction;
- Slopes Branch Junction;
- Liscard & Poulton; opened October 1895; closed 4 January 1960;
- Seacombe; opened 1 June 1895; renamed Seacombe & Egremont July 1901; renamed Seacombe January 1953; closed 4 January 1960.
