= Rail transport in Wales =

Overview of railways in Wales

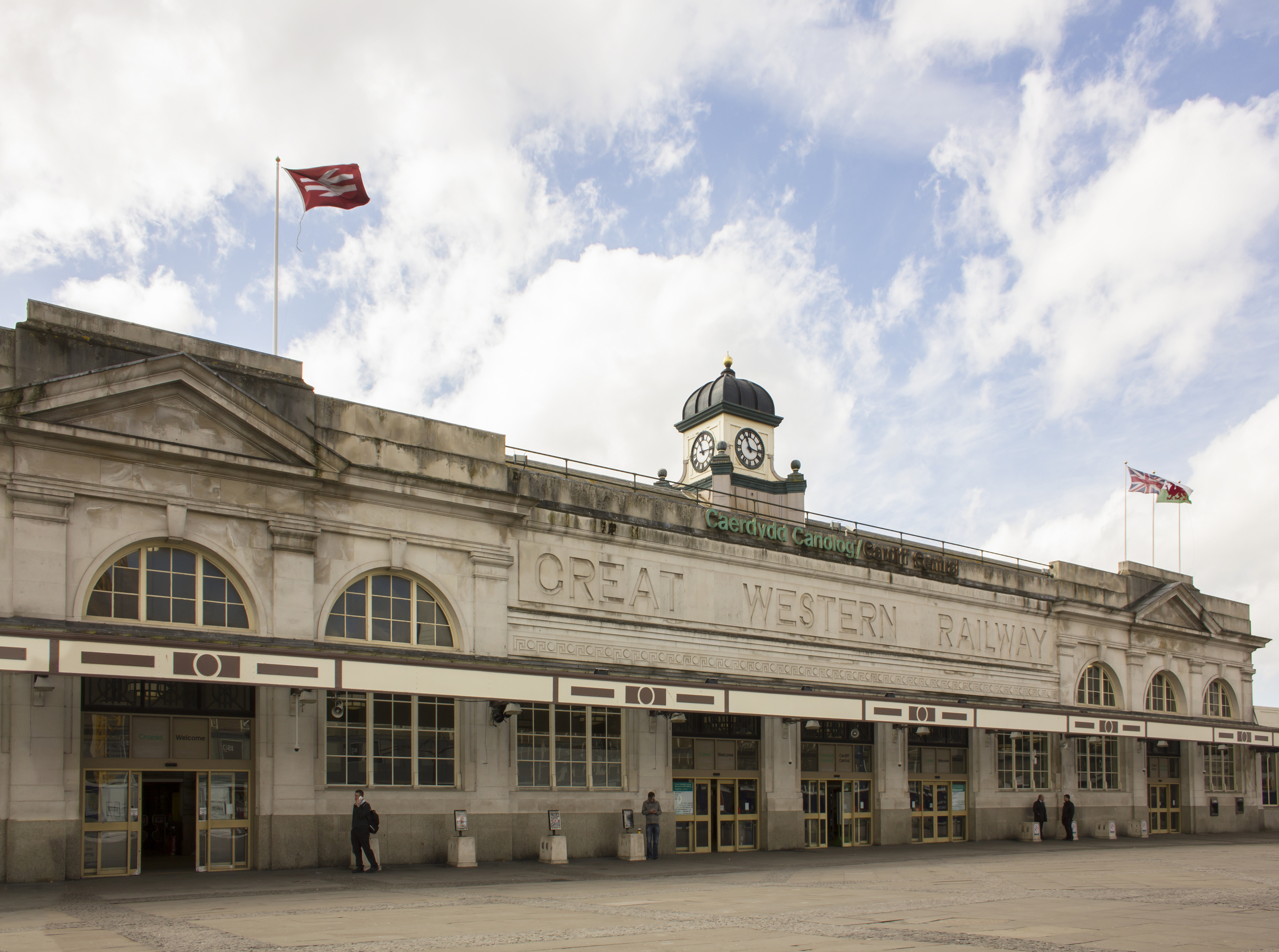
- Cardiff Central railway station

Operation
- Infrastructure company: Network Rail
- Major operators: Transport for Wales Rail

Features
- No. of stations: 223
Map
- Existing rail network of Wales

Rail transport in Wales began in the early 19th century initially used for industrial purposes and shortly began to be used for commercial purposes. The Beeching cuts had a significant impact on rail transport in Wales, closing a large number of railway stations. Since then some stations have reopened in Wales and following Welsh devolution, the Wales and Borders passenger rail franchise was established in 2001 and the operator was taken into public ownership by the Welsh Government in 2021.

Rail services are generally managed by the Welsh Government whilst rail infrastructure is generally the responsibility of the UK Government. Rail in Wales is mostly operated by Transport for Wales Rail. Current developments include the North Wales Metro, South Wales Metro and Swansea Bay and West Wales Metro.

== History ==
=== Early history ===
The world's oldest known iron railway bridge, Pont-y-Cafnau was designed and built in 1793. On 21 February 1804 the first recorded steam-hauled journey on rails took place in Merthyr Tydfil from Penydarren to the Glamorganshire Canal.

Swansea and Mumbles Railway was opened in 1807, becoming the first fare-paying passenger rail service in the world.

The Ffestiniog Railway was incorporated by an Act of Parliament in 1832 and opened to commercial traffic in 1836, linking Blaenau Ffestiniog with Porthmadog.

The Taff Vale Railway was authorised in 1836 to connect Merthyr Tydfil with the docks at Cardiff, with connections to the tramroads serving local ironworks.

In North Wales, the Chester and Holyhead Railway was developed to improve communications between London and Ireland through the port of Holyhead. The railway reached Holyhead in 1848, but passengers initially had to cross the Menai Strait by road between trains. The opening of the Britannia Bridge in 1850 allowed through rail journeys between London and Holyhead.

The South Wales Railway opened between Chepstow and Swansea in June 1850. Built to broad gauge, it was operated by the Great Western Railway under a lease agreement. Completion of the railway bridge at Chepstow in July 1852 provided a continuous connection to Gloucester and London. Extensions west of Swansea reached Neyland, then known as New Milford, in April 1856.

In mid-Wales, Cambrian Railways developed through a series of amalgamations beginning in 1864. Further mergers in 1865 and 1904 brought its network to approximately 230 miles (370 km) of track across the region.

Trains between South Wales, Bristol and London crossed the River Severn at Gloucester. The Severn Railway Bridge was opened in 1879, and continued to operate until it collapsed in 1960. In 1873, a Severn Estuary tunnel began construction including permanent water pumps which remain operational. The first trains passed through the tunnel in 1886 and for a century remained the longest underwater tunnel in the world.

=== Grouping and nationalisation ===
The railway grouping of the early 1920s brought several Welsh companies into an enlarged Great Western Railway. These included the Barry Railway, Cambrian Railways, Cardiff Railway, Rhymney Railway and Taff Vale Railway. The Great Western retained its name as one of the four principal railway companies created by the reorganisation. The London and North Western Railway, which operated the North Wales coast route, became part of the London, Midland and Scottish Railway on 1 January 1923.

Both companies became part of the nationalised British Railways in 1948. The former Great Western network was administered by the Western Region of British Railways.

=== Beeching report ===
In 1963, the Beeching report aimed to reduce the debt of the nationalised British Rail and led to 189 stations in Wales intended for closure with lines and tracks removed over the next decade across Wales. This list for closure was in addition to another 166 Welsh stations and halt-stops that were proposed for closure prior to Beeching's report.

Some stations with particular industry works were saved. Larry Davies, an Arriva Trains Wales' community manager in 2013 said, "Although there were a lot of local protest from people as one would expect, I think the traffic that came from the power station saved the Conwy Valley line". Since the Beeching cuts and as of 2013, 32 stations have re-opened in Wales.

=== Wales and Borders franchise ===
In March 2000, the UK government announced its proposal to form the new Wales and Borders rail franchise, following long-standing calls for this by the Select Committee on Welsh Affairs. The Wales & Borders Train Company was formed on 14 October 2001 and run by National Express.

In 2016, Transport for Wales was established, and would oversee the procurement of the next operator of the franchise, then operated by Arriva Trains Wales, as well as Metro services on the Valley Lines.

In 2018, KeolisAmey Wales was appointed to operate the Wales and Borders franchise on behalf of Transport for Wales, replacing Arriva Trains Wales as the operator of the Wales and Borders franchise, and would be operating as a "partnership" between KeolisAmey and Transport for Wales while being branded as the latter. It commenced operations in October 2018. The introduction of a new operator was accompanied with a £5 billion investment into rail by the Welsh Government, during the 15-year franchise.

In 2020, Transport for Wales took ownership of Core Valley Lines from Network Rail, which runs from Cardiff to Aberdare, Merthyr Tydfil, Treherbert, Rhymney and Coryton.

==== Transition to public-owned operation ====
In February 2021, the Wales and Borders franchise was brought into public ownership by the Welsh government under the subsidiary Transport for Wales Rail. In the same year, a new app was launched and Bow Street railway station became the first Transport for Wales built station.

As of 2023, there are 223 rail stations in Wales.

== Network ==
Rail network of Wales

=== Geography ===
The Welsh railway system is split into three detached parts: The South Wales network, consisting of the South Wales Main Line, the West Wales lines and their complex network of associated branches, including the Valley Lines, the Cambrian Line serving mid-Wales, and in North Wales, the North Wales Coast Line and its associated branches. The three parts are linked together by the Welsh Marches Line and Shrewsbury–Chester line which both run partly through Wales and partly through England.

=== Railway lines ===
- Mid Wales lines
  - Heart of Wales line
  - Cambrian Main line
  - Cambrian Coast Line
- North Wales lines
  - North Wales Coast Line
  - Conwy Valley line
  - Borderlands line
  - Wrexham to Chirk
- South Wales lines
  - South Wales Main Line
  - Newport to Chepstow line
  - Newport to Abergavenny Line
  - Swanline
- Valley Lines
  - Butetown Line
  - City Line
  - Vale of Glamorgan Line
  - Merthyr line
  - Aberdare line (Merthyr line branch to Aberdare)
  - Rhondda line
  - Rhymney line
  - Maesteg Line
  - Ebbw Valley Line
- West Wales lines
  - Swansea to Pembroke Dock
  - Swansea to Milford Haven and Fishguard

=== Heritage railways ===
Various heritage railways are present in Wales. Some are part of the Great Little Trains of Wales initiative. The Talyllyn Railway became the world's first preserved railway in 1951. Originally opened in 1866 to serve the Bryn Eglwys slate quarry, the line had deteriorated following the quarry's closure in 1946. Its owner, Henry Haydn Jones, continued to support the railway until his death in 1950, after which it was taken over for preservation.

The Ffestiniog Railway reopened to passengers in stages. Services between Porthmadog and Boston Lodge resumed on 23 July 1955, followed by successive extensions towards Blaenau Ffestiniog. Restoration included a new alignment between Dduallt and Tanygrisiau to replace a section of the original route that had been flooded. Passenger services reached Blaenau Ffestiniog on 25 May 1982, restoring the full route and providing an interchange with British Rail services.

The restored Welsh Highland Railway connects Caernarfon with Porthmadog over a 25 miles (40 km) route through Beddgelert and the Aberglaslyn Pass. Following special trains in 2010 and a limited opening in February 2011, regular services over the complete route began in April 2011.

- Bala Lake Railway
- Brecon Mountain Railway
- Corris Railway
- Fairbourne Railway
- Ffestiniog Railway
- Llanberis Lake Railway
- Pontypool and Blaenavon Railway
- Rhyl Miniature Railway
- Snowdon Mountain Railway
- Talyllyn Railway - in 1951, this became the first preserved railway in the world.
- Vale of Rheidol Railway
- Welsh Highland Railway – Longest heritage railway in the UK.
- Welshpool and Llanfair Light Railway

=== Electrification ===
The first stretch of line to be electrified in Wales was the South Wales Main Line between the Severn Tunnel and Cardiff Central railway station, which was electrified as part of the Great Western Main Line upgrade, and was completed in 2020. Plans to extend the electrification from Cardiff to Swansea were scrapped in 2017. As of December 2024, the Treherbert, Merthyr, Coryton and Aberdare Core Valley lines are electrified with the new Class 756 trains being phased into use. Plans are in place for electrification of the Rhymney, Bay and City Lines. The Cardiff Bay tramway will also be largely electrified.

== Management ==
Responsibility for agreements with rail operators and the procurement of the specific Welsh rail franchise rests with the Welsh government, whilst rail infrastructure and overall franchising powers are held by the UK government. Rail infrastructure in Wales is managed by Network Rail and is part of the Wales & Western region, including some parts of England along the England–Wales border, and parts of South West England.

=== Powers ===
Wales' railway network is not devolved to the Welsh Government and Senedd, with there being limitations. The Welsh Government has been devolved some executive functions in relation to rail transport. These are primarily on the issues of funding, passenger rail franchising, discontinuing or closing railway services or some railway assets, under the Railways Act 2005 and the Welsh Ministers (Transfer of Functions) (Railways) Order 2018 (SI 2018/631). The Welsh Government has the power to make Transport and Works Act orders in relation to the construction and operation of railways, tramways, trolley vehicles, and other guided transport systems, where the order authorises the acquisition or use of land rights, and the charging of tolls and penalty fares. However, any application determined to be classed as "England and Wales", for example a railway line crossing the England–Wales border, then that is the responsibility of the UK Government's Secretary of State for Transport.

As it is not devolved, the Welsh Block Grant (determined by the Barnett formula) does not include funding for rail infrastructure to the Welsh Government, although the Welsh Government can still invest in rail, including for rail infrastructure and railway stations using its existing funding, but the responsibility of rail infrastructure and funding for Network Rail lies with the UK Secretary of State for Transport. This differs from Scotland, where such powers are devolved. In relation to building new railway stations in Wales, while the Welsh Government can invest, Network Rail is the asset owner and rail network operator of rail infrastructure in England and Wales, with the UK Secretary of State being responsible for the specifications of any enhancements and the funding provided for such enhancements. The UK Government's New Stations Fund is an example of a funding source for many of the proposed railway stations in Wales made by the Welsh Government, although other proposals such as Cardiff Parkway can be funded privately with support from the Welsh Government or by gaining funding from European Structural and Investment Funds. To assess its proposals, the Welsh Government conducts a three-stage assessment process for proposed station in Wales, with the business case of a station prioritised as a greater chance to secure UK Government funding, while limiting expenses and construction time are also prioritised.

The UK Secretary of State produces a High Level Output Specification (HLOS) and Statement of Funds Available (SoFA) to set out the priorities of Network Rail. This later develops into a Control Period, a five-year long rail plan for rail infrastructure in England and Wales.

==== Devolution of more powers ====
In 2005, the UK Government offered to devolve rail infrastructure to Wales. The Welsh Assembly Government of the time refused, citing concerns around funding, the weakness of the Welsh civil service and possible issues arising from the levels of integration between Wales's rail infrastructure with England's.

The 2011 Commission on Devolution in Wales had recommended that rail infrastructure be devolved to Wales. The St David's Day Agreement was created following many of the commission's recommendations, but did not include the devolution of rail infrastructure.

In 2021, the Welsh Affairs Select Committee had proposed for the establishment of a "Wales Rail Board" rather than devolving infrastructure to Wales.

== Political concerns ==
=== Criticism of funding and "England and Wales" projects ===
A report by the Wales Governance Centre found that Wales could have utilised an additional £514 million rail infrastructure between 2011-12 and 2019-20 if rail were fully devolved, and an additional £505 million for the following five years.

In the 2020s, the Welsh Government and Welsh politicians had criticised the UK Government for the classification of some rail infrastructure schemes.

In 2020, the UK Government had classified High Speed 2 (HS2) as an "England and Wales" project. This move was criticised by Welsh MPs and Welsh Government ministers, who argued such a classification had little justification as High Speed 2 did not pass through Wales, and they claim would not give any benefits to Wales. The classification would mean, unlike Scotland, Wales would not receive a Barnett consequential, estimated at £5 billion. By February 2020, the Welsh Government had received £755 million in HS2-linked funding, with the UK Government stating it was "investing record amounts in Wales' railway infrastructure" and the Welsh Government had received a "significant uplift" in Barnett-based funding due to the UK Government's increased funding of HS2, with Network Rail to invest £1.5 billion in Wales' railways between 2019 and 2024. In April 2023, all parties of the Senedd agreed to a motion introduced by Plaid Cymru that called on the UK Government to re-allocate funding to Wales that is "rightfully owed" for HS2.

In 2023, the UK Government classed Northern Powerhouse Rail, as another "England and Wales" project, which would have given Wales a Barnett consequential of £1 billion if classed as an "England" project. The decision was criticised by the Welsh Liberal Democrats. In January 2025, ministers of the new Labour UK Government admitted that Wales' railways has had issues with low funding, with a government source stating it "suffered chronic underinvestment". Transport Secretary Heidi Alexander stated in a letter that funding for Wales' railways has been as "low levels" for recent years, while Welsh secretary, Jo Stevens, claimed that the previous Conservative UK Government conducted "14 years of underfunding", while also dismissing concerns over HS2 funding. In June 2025, East West Rail, it was revealed that a rail project between Oxford and Cambridge, was classified as an "England and Wales" project.

In June 2025, the new Labour UK Government, announced Wales would receive £445 million for its railways over the next ten years as part of the 2025 Spending Review. David Chadwick, a Welsh Liberal Democrat MP, called the amount "insulting", with other opposition parties criticising the small amount of funding. In response to Chadwick, Darren Jones, Chief Secretary to the Treasury, stated that Chadwick should be "a little more grateful". In comparison, the Conservatives claimed that they spent £1.1 billion on Wales' railway infrastructure between 2014 and 2024. While the Liberal Democrats and Plaid Cymru state that due to HS2 being classed as "England and Wales" but not passing through Wales, that was Wales was losing out on billions, whereas the Labour Welsh Government stated a smaller figure of £431 million was lost due to the classification.

=== Criticism of the state of the railways ===
In April 2023, Wales' transport minister, Lee Waters has described Welsh rail as having been "pretty bleak for a while" and included overcrowding and cancellations. He has accused the UK government of a "managed decline" of Welsh rail, which the UK government denies. Waters accused Network Rail's running period of 2024-2029 which shows infrastructure failures and deteriorating assets which he says will cause speed restrictions, worsened reliability, and further service failures. A spokesperson of the UK government treasury responded by saying that "we're committed to improving services for rail passengers in Wales, investing a record-breaking £2bn in Welsh railways from April 2019 to March 2024."

== Future initiatives ==
Transport for Wales (TfW) have planned three regional metros in Wales, the South Wales Metro, Swansea Bay and West Wales Metro and the North Wales Metro.

=== Transport for Wales 2025 ===
TfW say that their first phase of rail services improvement will be complete by 2025. The operating service said that there will be a "generational" change to services in the Wales and Borders franchise after 148 new trains are deployed in Wales; over 170 km (110 miles) of rail lines is electrified; new stations are built; improvements are made to tracks and signals.

By 2025, TfW has promised a more expansive and frequent service on its network, all trains being replaced, with 95% of journeys on 148 new trains, and a 65% increase in capacity. TfW aim to operate five new stations, and have an improved service on Sundays. They also plan to electrify part of the South Wales Valleys rail network, while also providing >600 new jobs, better Wifi services, more station car parking spaces and smarter ticketing.

=== Proposals ===
- List of proposed railway stations in Wales
- North–South Wales railway

== Passenger services ==
Transport for Wales' route map in May 2022

All passenger routes in Wales are operated by Transport for Wales Rail, as part of the cross-border Wales and Borders franchise, involving services throughout Wales and the routes making up the network through England. Transport for Wales operate the Premier Service, connecting Holyhead in north Wales, to Cardiff in the south.

Aside Transport for Wales Rail, Avanti West Coast operate a London Euston to Holyhead and Wrexham General service via Chester. In 2022, Grand Union was approved to operate services between Carmarthen and London Paddington, with the first services expected in 2024.

Train operating companies working in Wales include:

- Transport for Wales Rail – Most services in the Wales & Borders franchise.
- Avanti West Coast – North Wales to English West Midlands and London Euston.
- CrossCountry Trains – Cardiff/Newport to the English Midlands and North West England.
- Great Western Railway – South Wales to London Paddington, South West England and Hampshire.

== Other ==
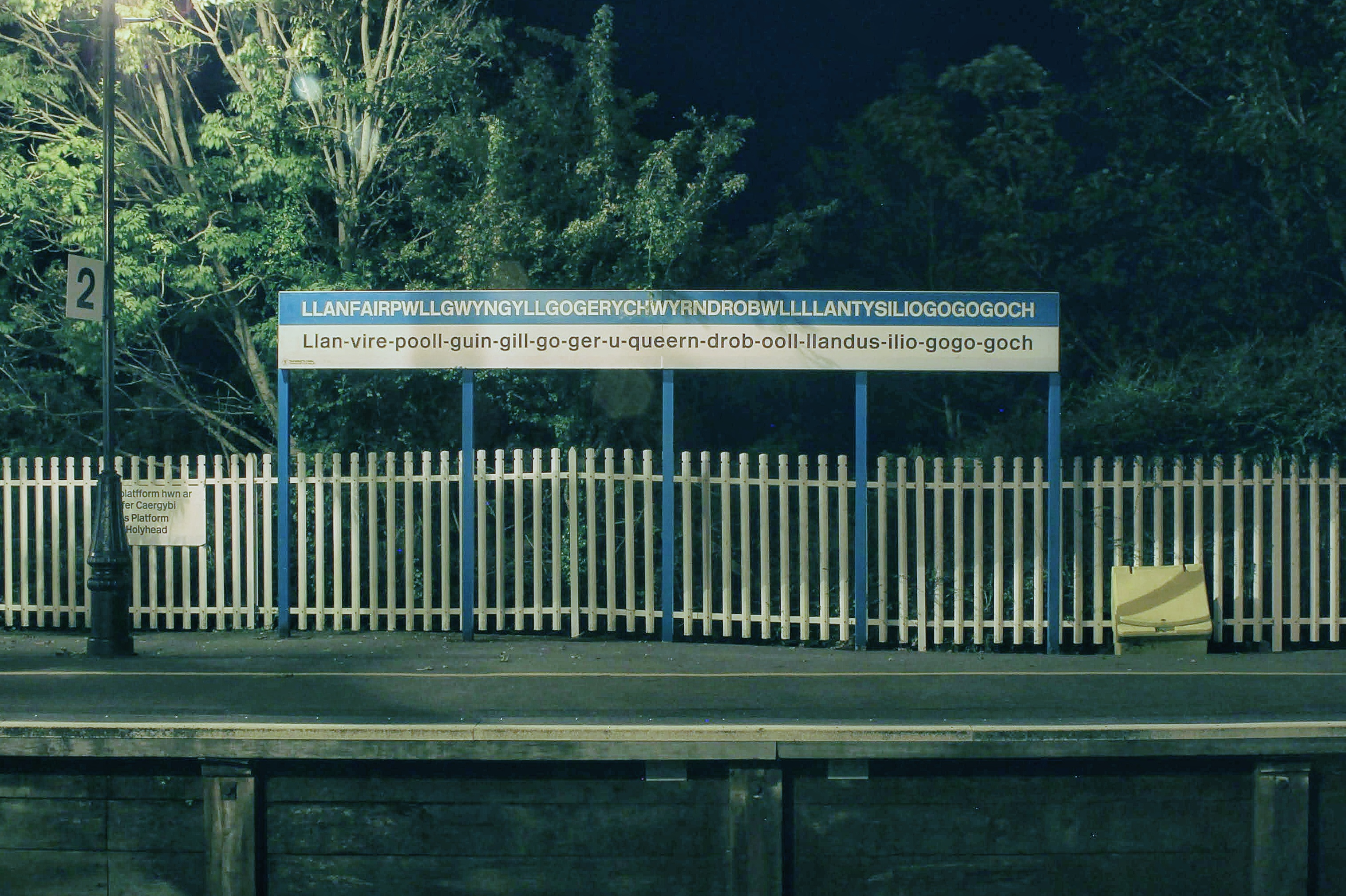
Sign at Llanfairpwll railway station, showing a longer version of its name

- One of the stations, Llanfairpwll railway station, has the longest station name on a sign in the UK, with the sign reading Llanfairpwllgwyngyll-gogerychwyrndrobwllllantysiliogogogoch.
- The Global Centre of Rail Excellence, a proposed railway test centre, is located in South Wales.

== See also ==
- Transport in Wales
- Rail transport in Great Britain
