= TFW =

TFW or TfW may refer to:

- Temporary foreign worker program in Canada
- TracFone Wireless
- Transport for Wales, Welsh Government company
- Transport for Wales Rail, Welsh train operator since 2021
- KeolisAmey Wales, also operated as Transport for Wales from 2018 to 2021
