= Premier Service =

Passenger train service between North and South Wales

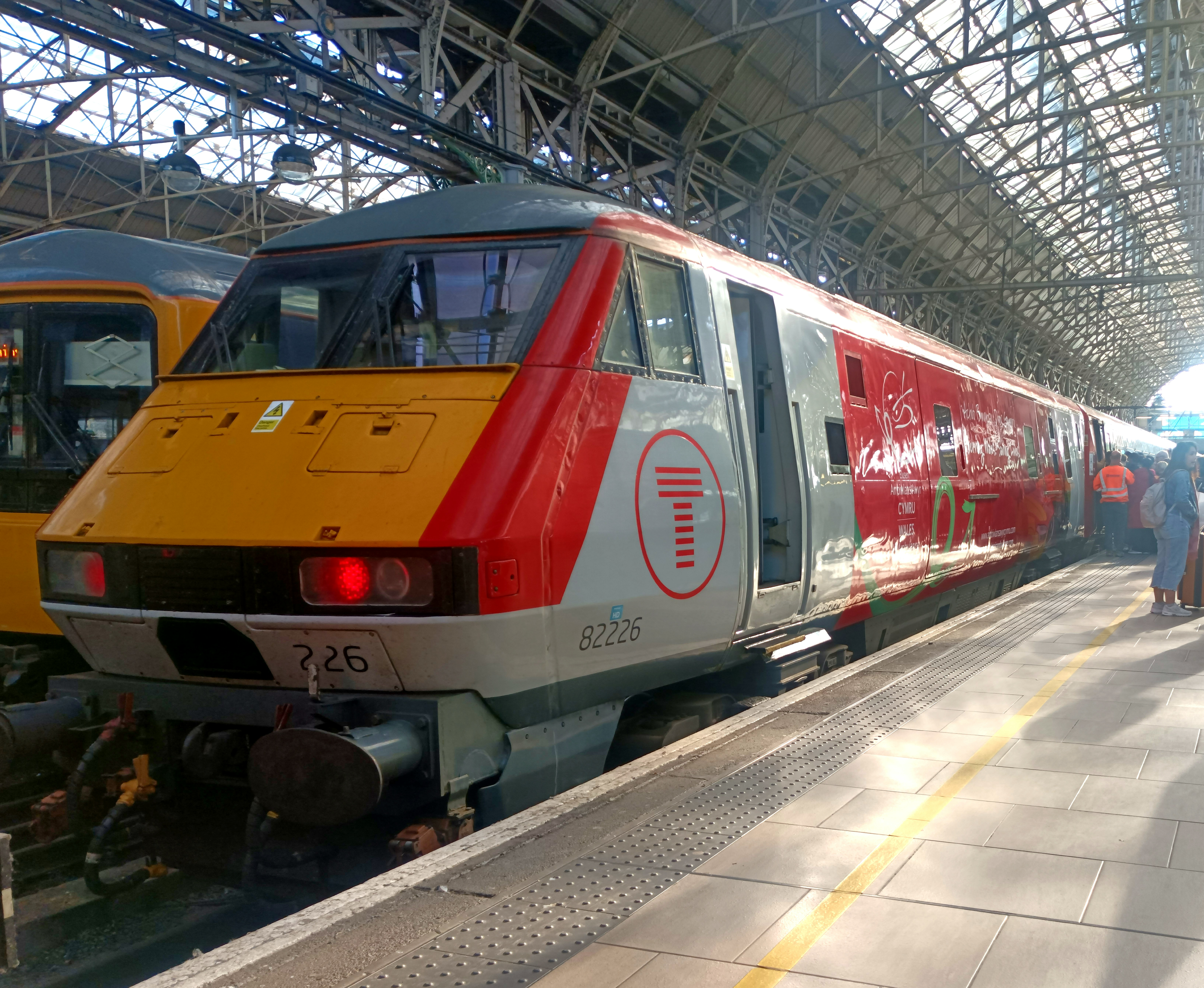
- Premier Service at Manchester Piccadilly in 2025

Overview
- Service type: Passenger train
- First service: 15 December 2008
- Current operator: Transport for Wales Rail
- Former operators: Arriva Trains Wales; KeolisAmey Wales

Route
- Termini: Holyhead; Manchester Piccadilly; Cardiff Central
- Average journey time: 4 hours, 30 minutes
- Service frequency: Monday - Friday
- Train numbers: 1V91; 1W96
- Lines used: North Wales Coast; Chester-Shrewsbury; Welsh Marches; South Wales

Technical
- Rolling stock: Class 67; Mark 4 Mark 4 DVT
North Wales South Wales Service
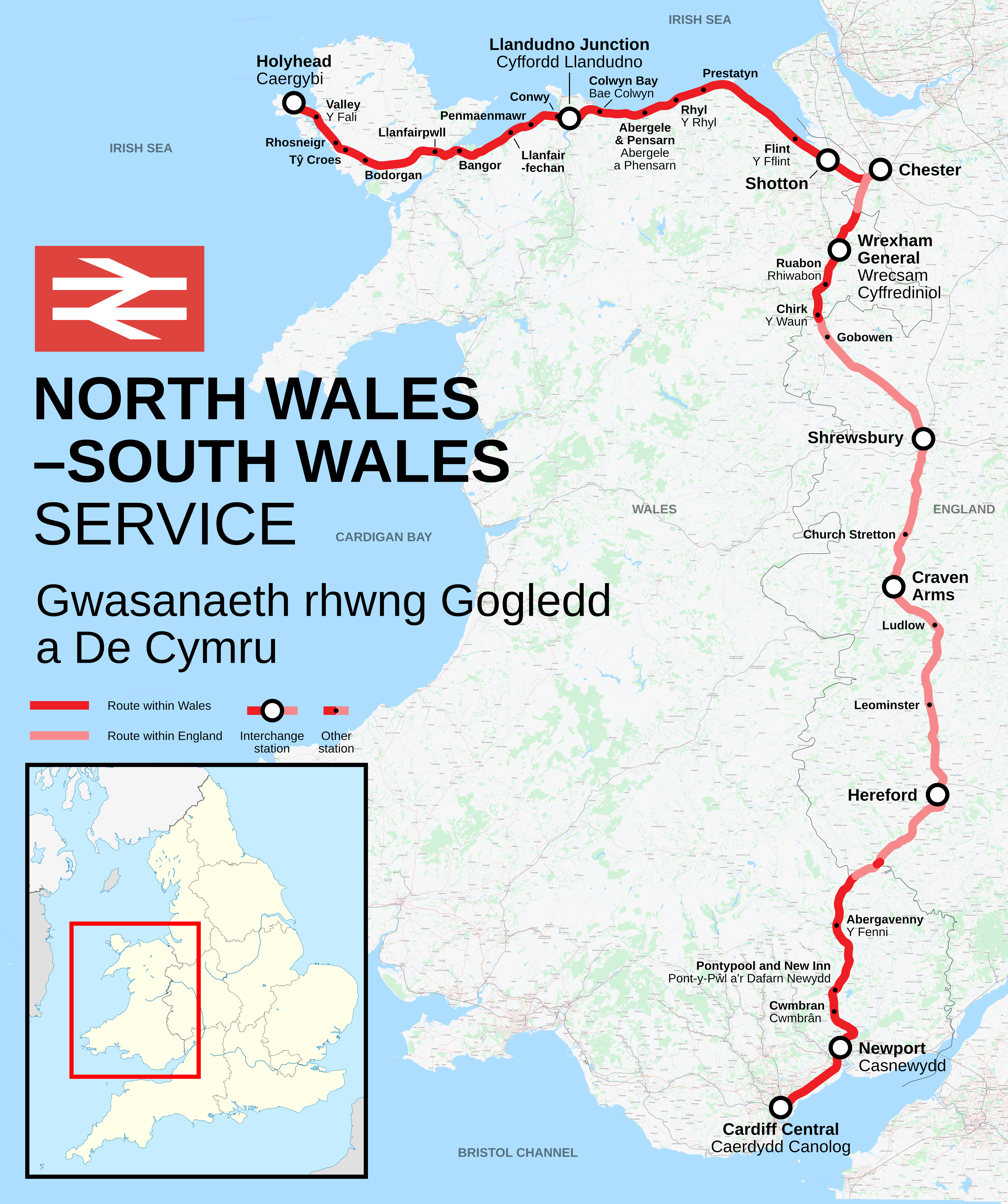

The Premier Service is a passenger train service in Wales, operated by Transport for Wales Rail between Holyhead and Cardiff Central, connecting North Wales and South Wales. Similar services also operate between South Wales and Manchester.

== History ==
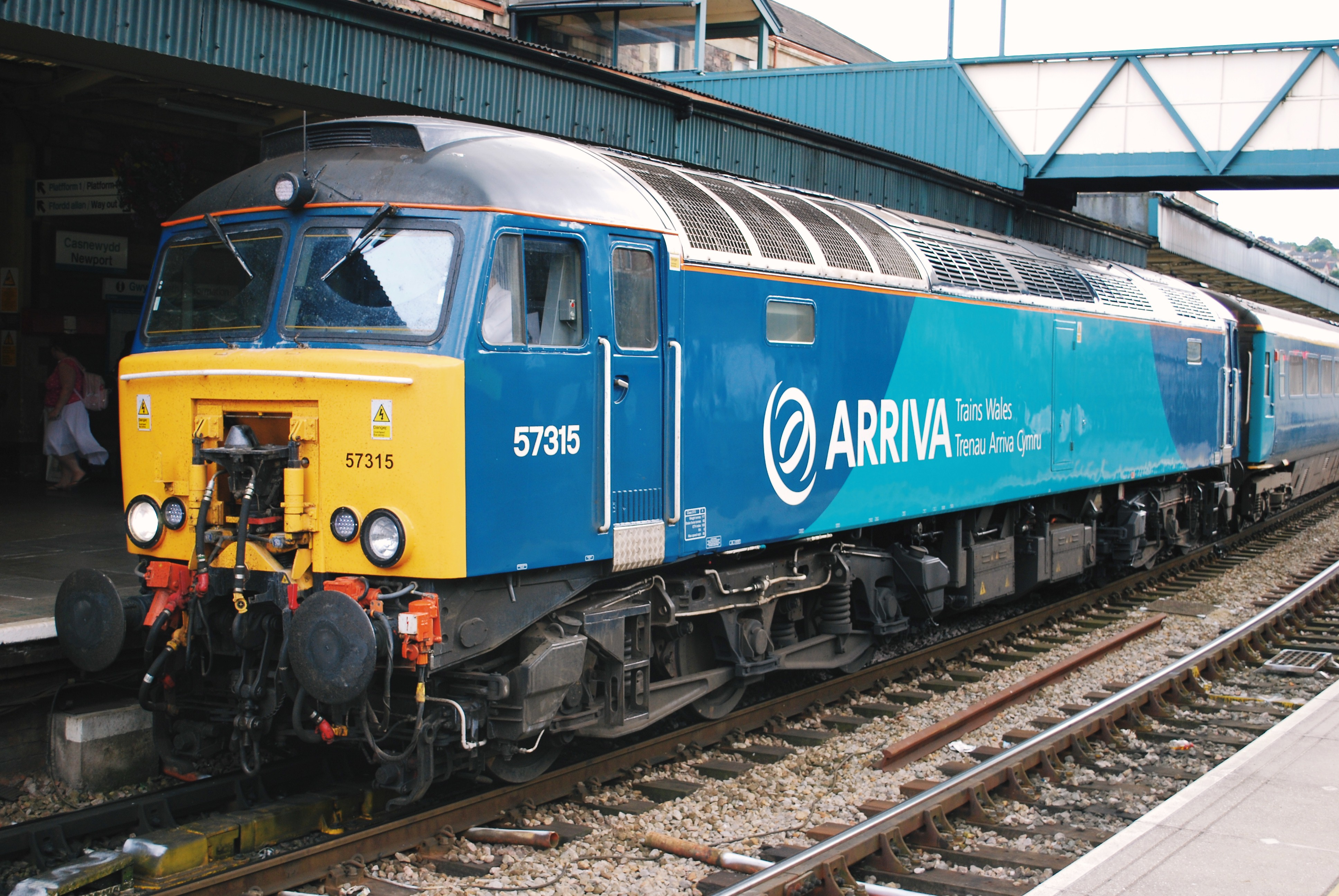
57315 at Newport in May 2009

On 15 December 2008, the Premier Service commenced operating between Holyhead and Cardiff Central. Originally named Y Gerallt Gymro (Gerald of Wales), it was funded by the Welsh Government as a premium service to connect North and South Wales. Grand Central and Wrexham & Shropshire expressed an interest in operating the service; however, the contract was awarded to Wales & Borders franchise holder Arriva Trains Wales.

Four Class 57 locomotives (57313–57316) were sublet from Virgin Trains to operate in top and tail formation, with one Mark 3 and three Mark 2 carriages. By February 2009, the service was being operated by a single Class 57.

In March 2012, the Class 57s were replaced by DB Schenker Class 67s. The Mark 2 carriages were replaced with Mark 3 carriages at the same time. It originally ran via Crewe but, from September 2012, it was rerouted via Wrexham General after a Driving Van Trailer was added; this allowed the train to change direction at Chester.

In October 2018, operation of the Premier Service passed with the Wales & Borders franchise to KeolisAmey Wales. In March 2020, the service was suspended due to the COVID-19 pandemic with the Mark 3 coaches withdrawn. It resumed in June 2021, with Class 67s hauling Mark 4 coaches and, as of August 2021, three trains in each direction now operate five days a week.
