= Wales & Borders franchise =

Railway franchise in the UK

Wales & Borders Cymru a'r Gororau
- Operator: Transport for Wales Rail
- Main service areas: Wales, North West England, the West Midlands, and Gloucestershire.
- Dates of operation: 14 October 2001 – 6 December 2003: Wales & Borders; 7 December 2003 – 13 October 2018: Arriva Trains Wales; 14 October 2018 – 6 February 2021: KeolisAmey Wales; 7 February 2021 – present: Transport for Wales Rail

Technical
- Track gauge: 1,435 mm (4 ft 8 1/2 in)
April 2026 service map
Services in Wales
Services in England (Borders)

The Wales & Borders franchise (Welsh: Masnachfraint Cymru a'r Gororau) is a railway franchise for passenger services in the United Kingdom operated since 7 February 2021 by publicly owned operator, Transport for Wales Rail. The franchise covers the majority of rail services in Wales, with some services in the bordering English regions and counties, notably North West England, the West Midlands, and Gloucestershire.

== History ==
=== Wales & Borders ===
In March 2000, the Shadow Strategic Rail Authority announced plans to create a separate Wales & Borders franchise. In October 2001, the Valley Lines and Wales & West franchises were restructured as Wales & Borders and Wessex Trains, with the former taking responsibility for most services in Wales, including the Cambrian Line services from Central Trains. All franchises were operated by National Express.

In September 2003, the services from Birmingham New Street, Crewe and Manchester Piccadilly to Llandudno and Holyhead, as well as those between Bidston and Wrexham Central and Llandudno and Blaenau Ffestiniog, operated by First North Western, were transferred to the Wales & Borders franchise.

=== Arriva Trains Wales ===
In October 2002, a shortlist of Arriva, Connex/GB Railways, National Express and Serco/NedRailways were shortlisted to bid for the next franchise. In December 2003, Arriva commenced a 15-year contract to operate the franchise until 2018, trading as Arriva Trains Wales.

=== KeolisAmey Wales ===
In October 2016, Abellio, Arriva, KeolisAmey and MTR Corporation were shortlisted to bid for the next franchise, which would be operated under the Transport for Wales brand. In October 2017, Arriva withdrew from the bidding process. Abellio withdrew in February 2018 following the collapse of its partner Carillion in January. In May 2018, it was awarded to KeolisAmey Wales for a 15-year period from 14 October 2018 in a contract worth £5 billion. The contract aimed to deliver much-needed investment in the Welsh network, including:

- £800M investment in trains
- £194M to modernise 247 stations and build five brand new Metro stations
- 285 extra services Monday to Friday
- 294 extra Sunday services

In March 2020, an initial short-term agreement worth £40 million was confirmed, to assist the rail network during the March lockdown, due to the COVID-19 pandemic. On 31 May 2020, an Emergency Measures Agreement was approved to assist KeolisAmey Wales; it detailed that the Welsh Government has announced that it will spend up to £65 million over the next six months to ensure trains continue to operate on the franchise.

=== Welsh Government ===
In October 2020, the Welsh Government announced that the franchise was to be transferred to a publicly owned operator of last resort, Transport for Wales Rail, following significant falls in passenger numbers and revenue due to the COVID-19 pandemic.

All staff, rolling stock and services operated by KeolisAmey Wales were taken over by the nationalised operator on 7 February 2021. As part of the original agreement, Keolis and Amey continue to be responsible for infrastructure on the Core Valley Lines, where the South Wales Metro upgrade is set to take place. In addition, Keolis and Amey will continue to assist and work with the nationalised operator to provide improvements to services on the franchise, such as rolling stock and ticketing services.
