= Arriva Trains Wales =

Train operating company in Wales

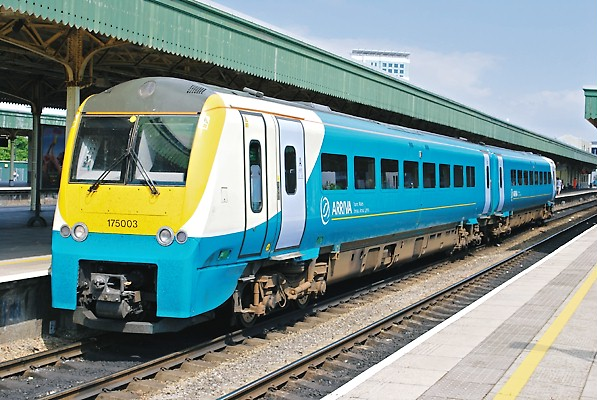
- Class 175 Coradia 1000 at Cardiff Central in 2009

Overview
- Franchises: Wales & Borders; 7 December 2003 – 13 October 2018
- Main region: Wales
- Other regions: North West; West Midlands; South West
- Fleet: 125 units 3 locomotive hauled sets
- Stations operated: 247
- Parent company: Arriva UK Trains
- Reporting mark: AW
- Predecessor: Wales and Borders
- Successor: KeolisAmey Wales

Technical
- Length: 1,623.8 km (1,009.0 mi)

Other
- Website: www.arrivatrains.co.uk

Arriva Trains Wales (ATW; Welsh: Trenau Arriva Cymru) was a Welsh train operating company owned by Arriva UK Trains that operated the Wales & Borders franchise. It ran urban and inter-urban passenger services to all railway stations in Wales, including Cardiff Central, Cardiff Queen Street, Newport, Swansea, Wrexham General and Holyhead, as well as to certain stations in England including (but not limited to) Hereford, Shrewsbury, Chester, Crewe, Manchester Piccadilly and Birmingham New Street.

In August 2003, Arriva UK Trains was awarded the newly created Wales & Borders franchise by the Strategic Rail Authority, with Arriva Trains Wales beginning operation during December 2003, taking over from Wales and Borders. Following the implementation of the Railways Act 2005 and Transport (Wales) Act 2006, responsibility for the franchise was devolved to the Welsh Government, which worked closely with Arriva Trains Wales during its period of operations. Numerous service changes were made under the company's management; on 6 February 2008, the Ebbw Valley Railway was partially re-opened to passenger services for the first time in over 40 years. Another high-profile change during December of that year was the inauguration of the locomotive-hauled Holyhead to Cardiff Premier Service.

In March 2010, Arriva Trains Wales' application to reinstate a direct Aberystwyth to London Marylebone service was rejected by the Office of Rail Regulation due to concerns over its financial viability, as well as the potential severe revenue abstraction from other operators such as Wrexham & Shropshire. In July 2012, the Department for Transport announced that the Cardiff Valley Lines would be electrified, although this ambition would not be substantiated during Arriva Train Wales' franchise period. During the mid-2010s, as the franchise period was nearing its end, tenders were sought for its next operator; Arriva Trains Wales' publicly withdrew from the process in October 2017 despite having been shortlisted. On 23 May 2018, KeolisAmey Wales was selected as the winning bid. On 13 October 2018, Arriva Trains Wales' franchise came to an end, operations being transferred to successor operator KeolisAmey that same day.

== History ==
During March 2000, the UK government announced its plans to create a separate Wales & Borders franchise. In October 2001, the two National Express-operated franchises, Valley Lines and Wales & West, were reorganised, after which the new Wales & Borders franchise assumed responsibility for the majority of services in Wales as shown on its map. The services from Birmingham New Street to Chester, Aberystwyth, and Pwllheli operated by Central Trains were also transferred. In October 2002, a shortlist of Arriva, Connex/GB Railways, National Express and Serco/NedRailways were shortlisted to bid for the new franchise period.

On 1 August 2003, the Strategic Rail Authority awarded the new franchise to Arriva UK Trains. The new franchise was for fifteen years, with performance reviews every five years; Arriva Trains Wales took over the services operated by Wales & Borders on 7 December 2003. The next five-yearly review period concluded on 31 March 2013. On 28 September 2003, the services from Birmingham New Street, Crewe and Manchester Piccadilly to Llandudno and Holyhead, as well as those between Bidston and Wrexham Central and between Llandudno and Blaenau Ffestiniog, operated by First North Western, were transferred to the new Wales & Borders franchise.

As a result of the Railways Act 2005 and the Transport (Wales) Act 2006, responsibility for the franchise was later devolved to the Welsh Government. Subsequently, the Welsh Government closely coordinated with Arriva Trains Wales in the management and development of the railway network within Wales. Changes included the introduction of direct services between North and South Wales, and the reintroduction of passenger services on previously freight-only portions of the Vale of Glamorgan Line and Ebbw Vale Line.

At its height, ATW operated over a route length of 1691 km, with 253 diesel multiple unit (DMU) cars and 22 locomotive-hauled passenger carriages. Its busiest Welsh stations were Cardiff Central, Cardiff Queen Street and Newport in South Wales, and Bangor (Gwynedd) and Wrexham General in North Wales.

ATW operated almost all services in Wales, with the exception of:

- Pembroke Dock/Carmarthen/Swansea/Cardiff Central to London Paddington (First Great Western)
- Cardiff Central to Portsmouth Harbour or Taunton (First Great Western)
- Cardiff Central to Nottingham or Manchester Piccadilly (Virgin CrossCountry)
- Holyhead/Bangor/Wrexham General to London Euston (Virgin Trains West Coast)
- various heritage railways

== Performance ==
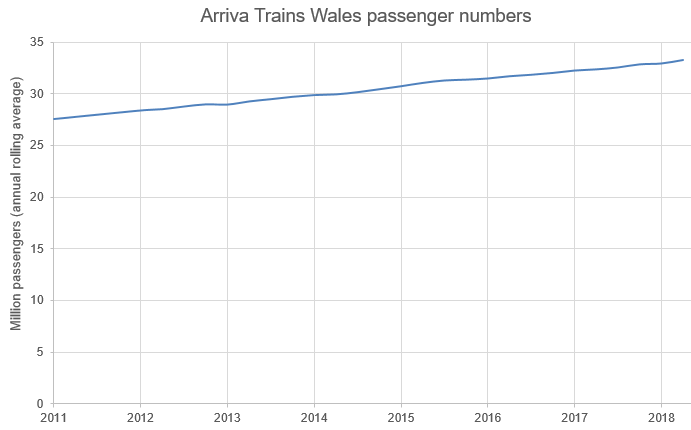
ATW passenger numbers from 2011 to 2018.

In October 2006, ATW was ranked seventh best (out of 21 companies) with an above average 89.9% of trains 'on time' according to Network Rail statistics. The latest figures released by NR (Network Rail) rate punctuality (Public Performance Measure) at 96.1% for period 7 of the 2013/14 financial year. The MAA (Monthly Annual Average) figure for the 366 days up to 12 October 2013 is currently at 93.9%.

In September 2017, a review on the conditions during a regular peak commute was published by 'Stu's Reviews'. This review was publicised through several of the national news networks, including Wales Online, and BBC Wales.

== Welsh-language services ==
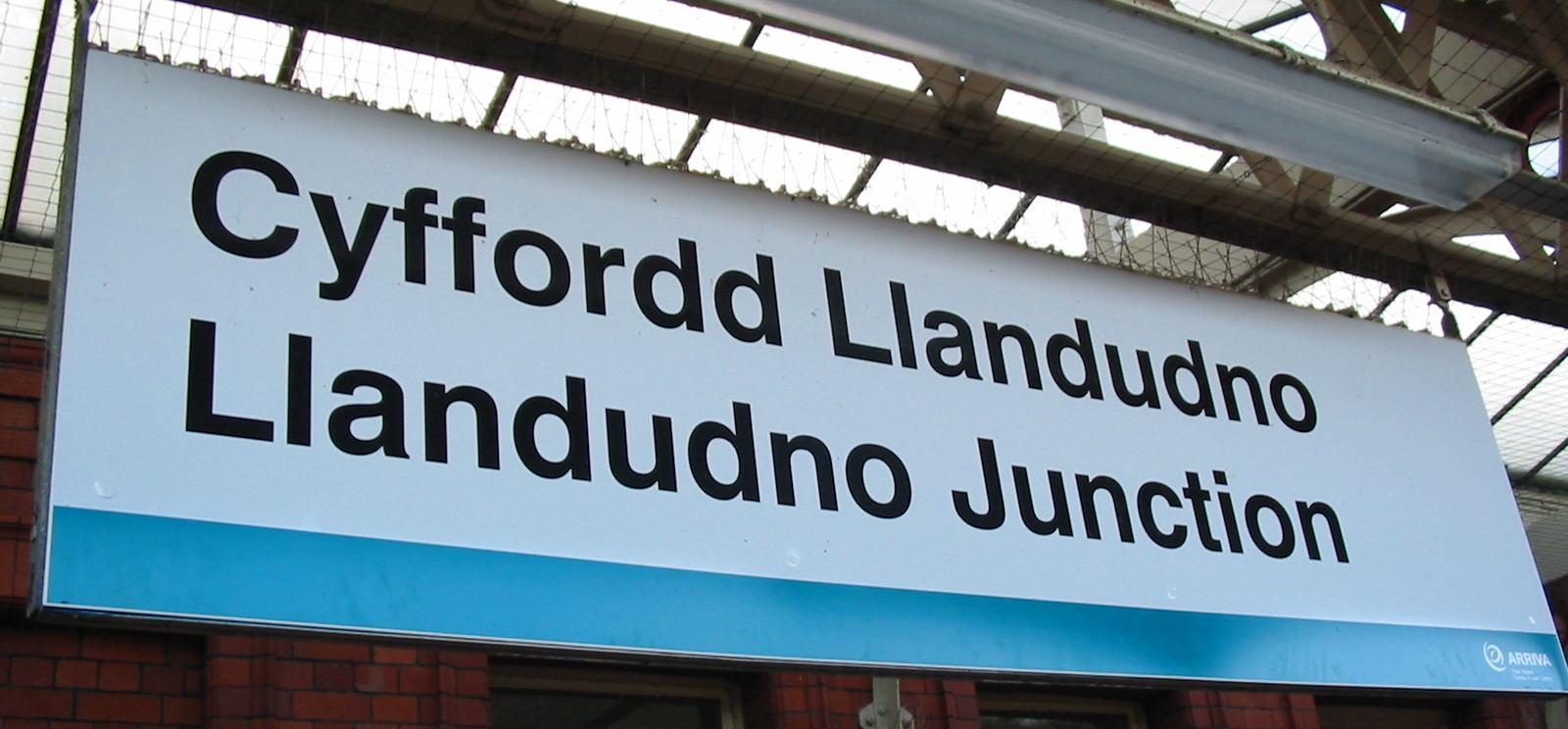
A bilingual station sign

The Welsh Language Act 1993 requires all public bodies to provide services to the public through the medium of Welsh as well as English. As a private company and not a public body, Arriva Trains Wales was not legally required to provide service in Welsh, but it did conduct some business in Welsh. All stations previously run by Arriva Trains Wales where the Welsh and English names differed had both names displayed, with a few minor omissions. Arriva did not display Welsh names in the English stations which it managed, such as Chester (Welsh: Caer), Shrewsbury (Welsh: Amwythig), or Hereford (Welsh: Henffordd), but included the Welsh names in its now discontinued printed timetables and other publicity material. There were bilingual signs at Hereford, for example, warning against trespassing on the railway.

Arriva Trains Wales introduced bilingual display screens and announcements in at least 46 stations.

In 2004, ATW introduced a Welsh-language telephone line. Its website was named the "Best Website of The Year in the Technology Wales Awards 2004".

== Routes ==
=== North Wales ===
Services along the North Wales Coast Line terminated at Holyhead and Llandudno. Llandudno services ran every hour to Manchester Piccadilly via Chester and Warrington Bank Quay. Holyhead services ran every hour, to Shrewsbury via Chester and Wrexham General, then alternately to Birmingham International or Cardiff Central. Request stations west of Llandudno Junction (Conwy, Penmaenmawr, Llanfairfechan, Llanfairpwll, Bodorgan, Ty Croes, Rhosneigr and Valley) were generally served by alternate trains. The Conwy Valley Line were operated by a single train running between Llandudno and Blaenau Ffestiniog, with six return journeys a day. The private Ffestiniog Railway operated connecting services between Blaenau Ffestiniog and Minffordd near Porthmadog.

Services on the Borderlands Line ran from Wrexham Central to Bidston on the Wirral Peninsula, crossing the North Wales Coast Line at Shotton. This line connected with main-line services at Wrexham General; with North Wales Coast line services at Shotton; and with electrified lines operated by Merseyrail at Bidston. It may be converted to electric operation in the future.

=== Mid Wales ===
Cambrian Line services consisted of trains from Aberystwyth to Shrewsbury, Birmingham New Street and Birmingham International every two hours. Services from Pwllheli joined this train at Machynlleth. Services were operated exclusively by Class 158 Express Sprinters, as they were the only units fitted with the necessary equipment for the ERTMS system used on the line.

The single-track nature of this line, coupled with the busy terminus at Birmingham New Street, meant that delays had in some cases resulted in partial cancellation of services on this line. Beginning December 2008, most services had been extended to the less busy Birmingham International station, giving more flexibility in making up any lost time; this was also intended to help international students at Aberystwyth University gain easier access to an airport. The Heart of Wales Line had services from Swansea to Shrewsbury via Llanelli and Llandrindod four or five times a day. It was marketed by Arriva Trains Wales as a scenic, rural line, with special rover tickets available.

=== South Wales ===
ATW operated an hourly long-distance service from Carmarthen to Manchester Piccadilly via Cardiff Central and the Welsh Marches Line. Some off-peak services terminated at or originated from Cardiff Central, and continued to or came from Milford Haven every two hours. There was also one service per day from Fishguard Harbour to Manchester Piccadilly, but not in the other direction. Some services operated to Tenby, Pembroke Dock, Carmarthen and Maesteg from Manchester Piccadilly.

ATW also operated a service every two hours from Cardiff Central to Holyhead via Wrexham General, other branches of the West Wales Line as served by trains from Swansea and Cardiff Central. Trains operated a shuttle service between Swansea and Cardiff Central (known as Swanline), calling at more minor stations than the Great Western Railway InterCity services did.

ATW also operated the Heart of Wales line between Shrewsbury and Swansea via Llandrindod, with four trains per day in each direction. Special trains extending into South East Wales operated to Builth Road during the Royal Welsh Show annually in July.

=== Cardiff and Valleys ===
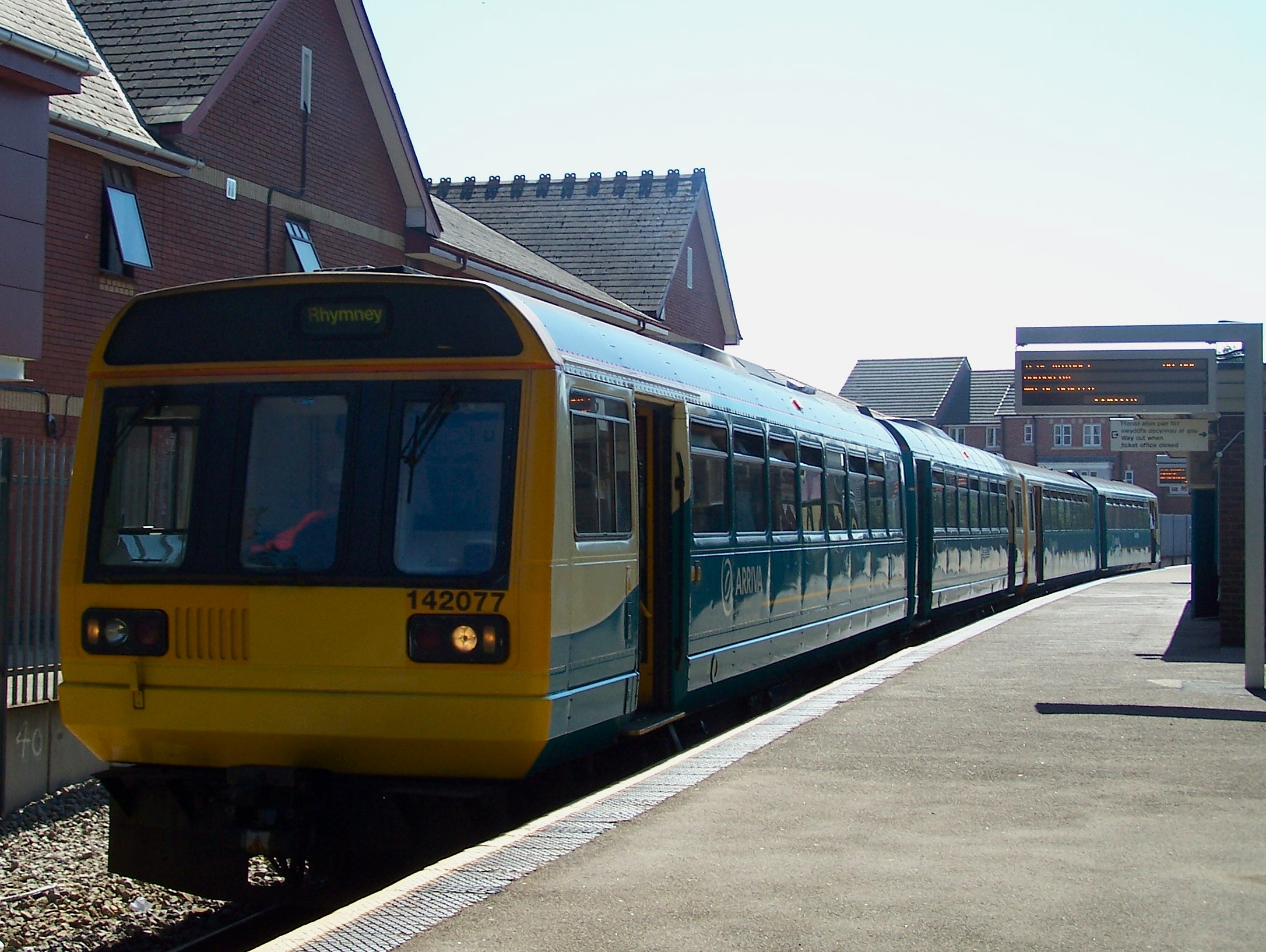
Arriva Trains Wales 142077 at Penarth

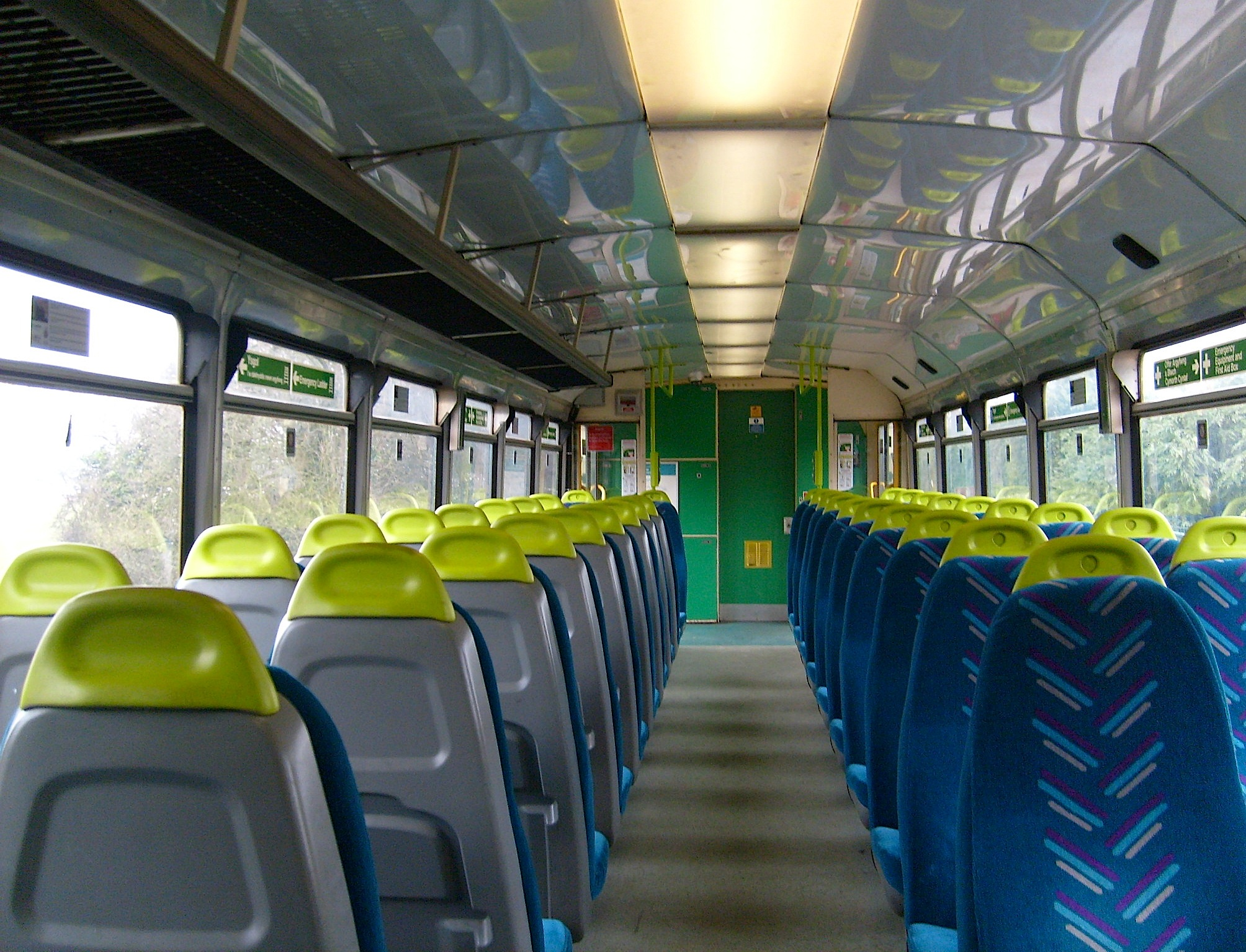
The interior of an Arriva Trains Wales Class 142

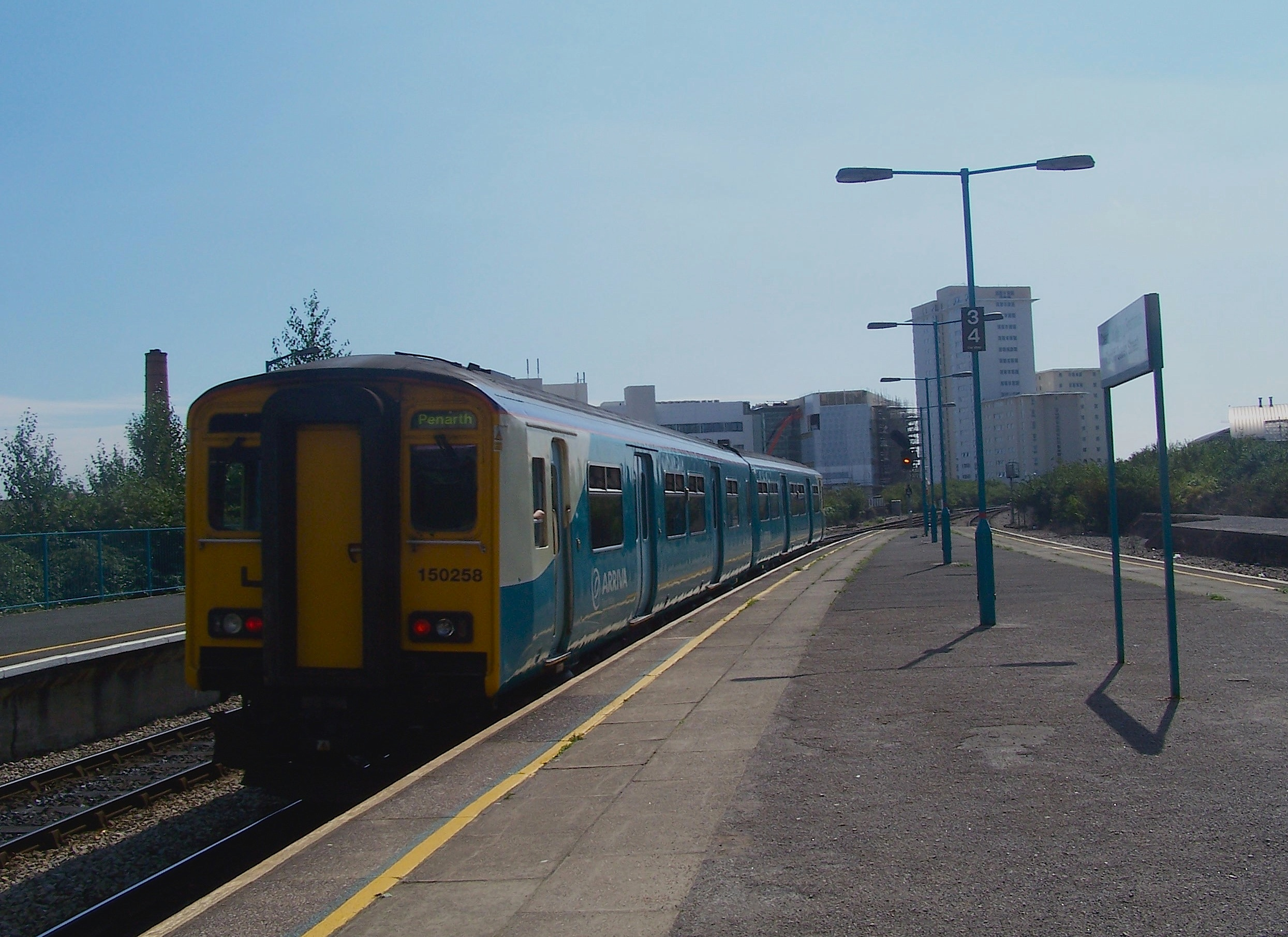
Arriva Trains Wales 150258 at Cardiff Queen Street

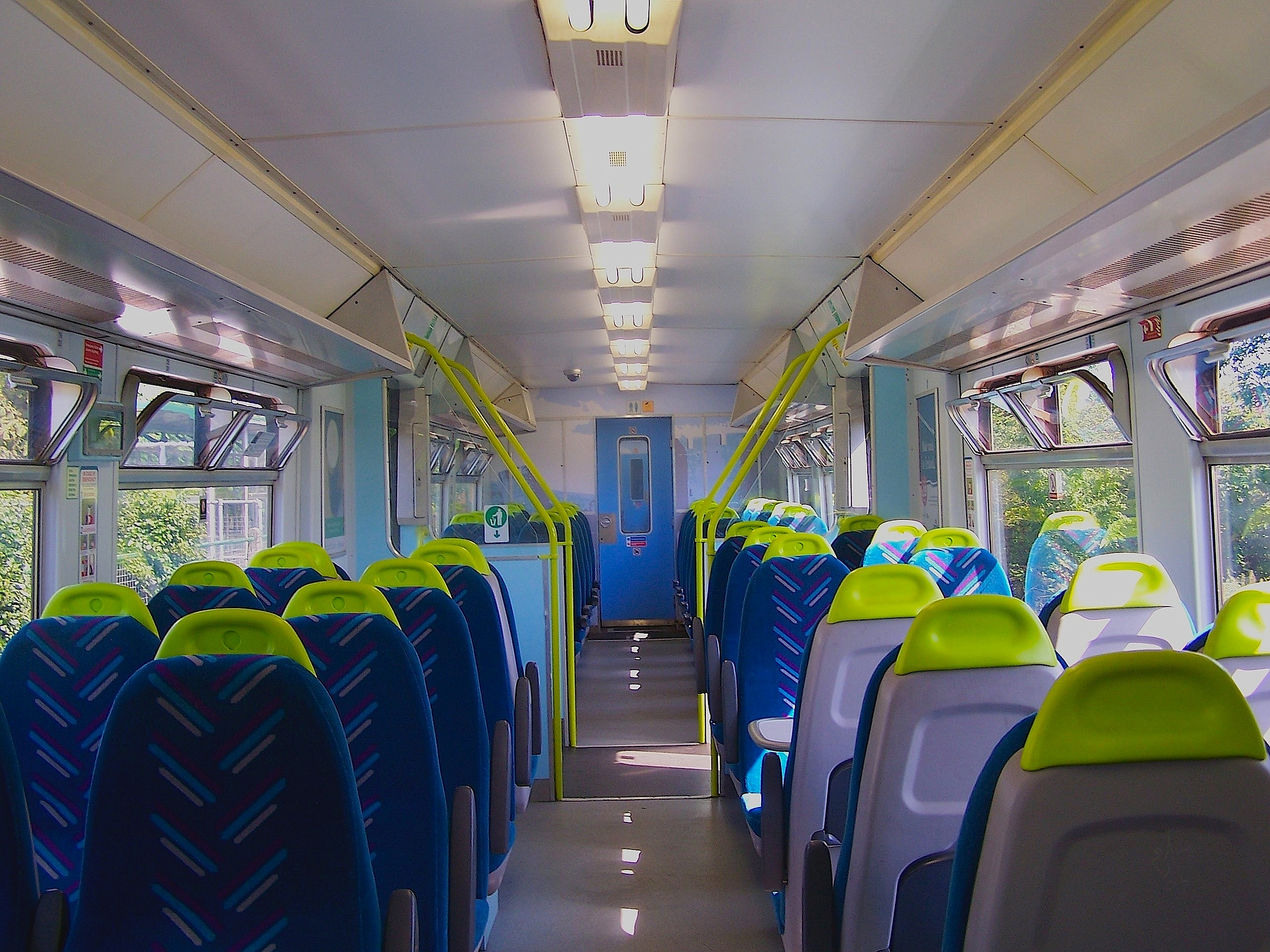
The interior of an Arriva Trains Wales Class 150

The Valley Lines network, previously operated as a separate franchise, was a collection of urban lines in Cardiff and the surrounding area, including the South Wales Valleys and the Vale of Glamorgan. Arriva Trains Wales also operated a service from Maesteg to Cheltenham Spa. Stations in the valleys north of Cardiff experienced strong passenger growth, as a result of which there was a new half-hourly service launched (Pontypridd-Treherbert, Abercynon-Aberdare, Abercynon-Merthyr Tydfil and in the future Bargoed to Rhymney). Service frequency growth at the fringes was a significant problem because of often lengthy single-track sections. Between the larger towns and Cardiff, these services combined to provide at least one train every 15 minutes, with six trains previously ran per hour between Pontypridd and Cardiff, and four trains per hour between Bargoed and Cardiff. Stations on the Treherbert and Rhymney branch lines were lengthened to accommodate six-car trains to cope with future growth demand for commuting into and out of the capital.

On 6 February 2008, the Ebbw Valley Railway was partially re-opened to passenger services for the first time in over 40 years. It provided an hourly service from Ebbw Vale Town railway station (opened 17 May 2015) to Cardiff Central calling at Ebbw Vale Parkway, Llanhilleth, Newbridge, Crosskeys, Risca and Pontymister, Rogerstone, Pye Corner, and Cardiff Central. One year after opening, the line had carried 573,442 passengers, beating all targets set by the Welsh Assembly Government. Saturday trains ran as four-car formations instead of the standard two. Extra carriages were also added during school holidays when demand was high. Possible developments that never saw the light of day also included restoring the service between Ebbw Vale and Newport; before Arriva discontinued operations, the proposal awaited Network Rail and Welsh Government approval. If it has been implemented, it would have provided an hourly service between Newport and Ebbw Vale. Due to the end of Arriva Train Wales' operations, any further plans will now be implemented under TFW.

In July 2012, the Department for Transport announced that the Cardiff Valley Lines would be electrified, although no timescale has been given. This will entail replacement of the life-expired Pacer railbuses by new or cascaded stock. This project did not emerge within the Arriva Trains Wales era, and shall now occur under the auspices of successor operator TFW.

=== Welsh Marches and Border ===
Services between Chester and Newport formed part of other ATW services already mentioned, such as Holyhead to Cardiff Central, or Milford Haven to Manchester Piccadilly. Coming north, after calling at Shrewsbury (for connections to Mid-Wales), trains for North Wales go to Chester via Wrexham General, and trains for Manchester go to Crewe.

=== Premier Service ===
A weekday Premier Service between Holyhead and Cardiff was introduced on 15 December 2008. This was run under contract to the Welsh Government. Wrexham & Shropshire and Grand Central expressed an interest in operating the service, but the contract was awarded to Arriva Trains Wales. At the time of the launch, it was known as Y Gerallt Gymro (Gerald of Wales), it was subsequently named as the Premier Service.

The Premium Service departed Holyhead at 05:34, returning from Cardiff departing at 17:16. It featured first-class accommodation and a full dining car with a travelling chef. Normal standard-class fares were valid on the train. First class attracted a supplement and included a complementary breakfast on the morning service and a three-course meal on the evening service. This was the only ATW service to offer first-class accommodation. It originally ran via Crewe but, in September 2012, the service was rerouted via Wrexham General, which required the train to change direction at Chester in addition to having its evening departure moved from 16:15.

In December 2014, the Premier Service was rebranded as the Business Class Service in an move by Arriva Trains Wales to promote the service and specifically appeal to those travelling to and from Cardiff to work. Ticket prices remained the same and were still sold as first class, and the restaurant service remains, although tablecloths and antimacassars were removed to promote a more work-like environment.

=== Special services ===
For special events, such as football or rugby matches, ATW commonly operated additional services to the venue. Wales & Borders had arranged in the past a stopping service to Edinburgh Waverley. Numerous other services have been operated. ATW usually operated shuttle services to Newport on match days. When rugby international matches are held at the Millennium Stadium, ATW often ran an extra Holyhead to Cardiff service using the Premier Service rolling stock. In April 2015, ATW were highly criticised and issued an apology for their continual poor performance when dealing with the Judgement Day rugby matches at the Millennium Stadium. Passengers were left queuing for hours due to the lack of services and lack of carriages available, some had to abandon their journeys for other means such as taxi and van hire. A spokesman for the company said “I want to assure all customers that every single train in Wales was out [on Saturday].” He added that the event differed to international rugby events, because the majority of those travelling to the matches travelled from south and south west Wales, placing huge pressure on specific routes.

=== Former services ===
Arriva Trains Wales used to operate services from Manchester Piccadilly, Pembroke Dock, Carmarthen and Swansea to London Waterloo, Brighton, Portsmouth Harbour, Plymouth and Penzance via Cardiff, Bristol and Westbury. Services south of Cardiff are operated by Great Western Railway, while the Bristol Temple Meads to London Waterloo services are operated by South Western Railway

=== Rejected services ===
During late 2009, ATW filed an application to reinstate a direct Aberystwyth to London Marylebone service, serving all stations to Birmingham International and additionally calling at Leamington Spa and Bicester North. As proposed, two off-peak trains would have operated each day, while a further service would have been added on Saturdays in high summer. Rolling stock would have been Class 158 Sprinters.

There were concerns voiced that, if ATW were granted this service, it would push Wrexham General to London Marylebone operator Wrexham & Shropshire out of business; Wrexham & Shropshire's Managing Director, Andy Hamilton, stated: "We believe that this proposal – if approved – would push the date of profitability of WSMR by at least a year. As a result of this our owning group would be unable to sustain additional and continuing losses and the WSMR service would cease to exist." In March 2010, it was announced that the application has been rejected by the Office of Rail Regulation due to concerns about the financial viability of the service and the potentially high level of revenue abstraction caused to other operators. Wrexham & Shropshire ceased to operate roughly one year later.

== Stations served ==
=== Major stations in Wales ===
- Cardiff Central
- Cardiff Queen Street
- Newport
- Bridgend
- Port Talbot Parkway
- Wrexham General
- Carmarthen
- Aberystwyth
- Colwyn Bay
- Rhyl
- Flint
- Shotton
- Holyhead
- Bangor (Gwynedd)
- Llandudno Junction
- Llandudno
- Maesteg
- Swansea

=== Stations in England ===
==== Managed by Arriva Trains Wales ====
- Broome
- Bucknell
- Chester
- Church Stretton
- Craven Arms
- Frodsham
- Gobowen
- Helsby
- Heswall
- Hereford
- Hopton Heath
- Knighton
- Leominster
- Lydney
- Ludlow
- Nantwich
- Neston
- Prees
- Runcorn East
- Shrewsbury
- Upton
- Wem
- Whitchurch
- Wrenbury
- Yorton

==== Managed by other companies ====
- Birmingham International (Virgin Trains)
- Birmingham New Street (Network Rail)
- Crewe (Virgin Trains)
- Earlestown (Northern)
- East Didsbury (Northern)
- Newton-le-Willows (Northern)
- Manchester Airport (TransPennine Express)
- Manchester Piccadilly (Network Rail)
- Manchester Oxford Road (Northern)
- Stockport (Virgin Trains)
- Telford Central (West Midlands Railway)
- Warrington Bank Quay (Virgin Trains)
- Wilmslow (Northern)
- Wolverhampton (West Midlands Railway)
- Stafford (Virgin Trains)
- Bidston (Merseyrail)
- Gloucester (Great Western Railway)
- Cheltenham Spa (Great Western Railway)

== Rolling stock ==
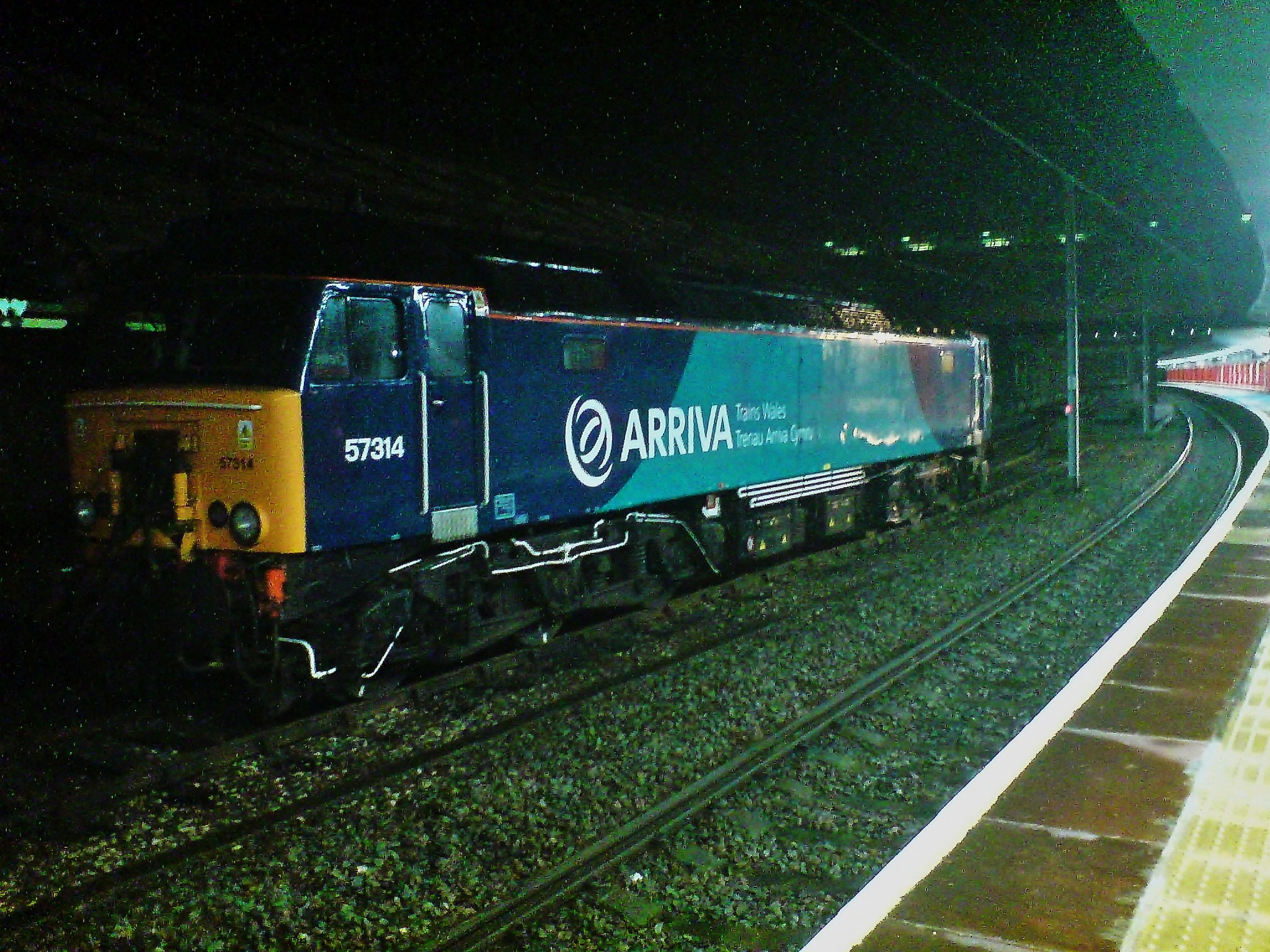
57314 at Crewe in March 2009

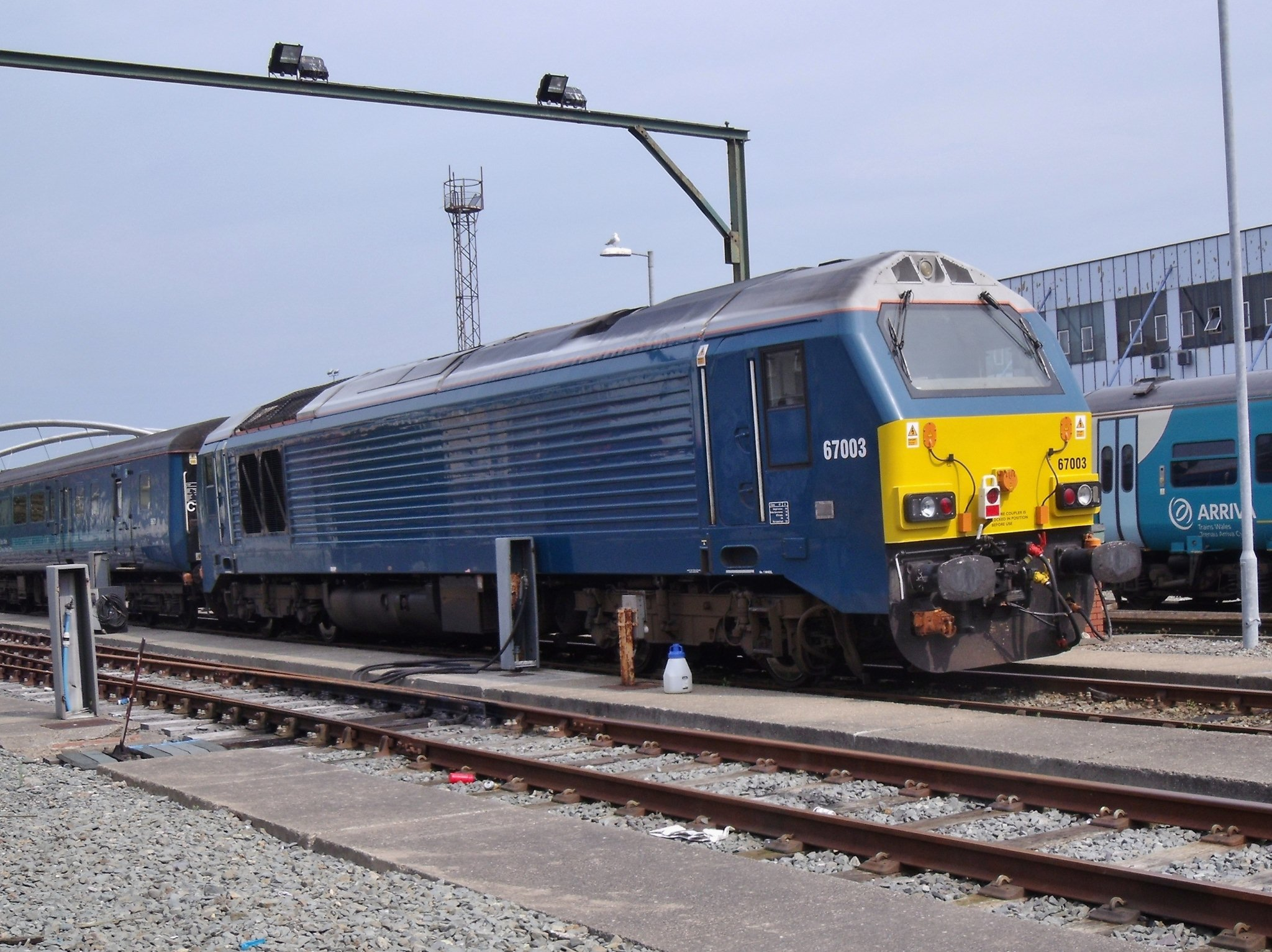
67003 at Holyhead in August 2012

Arriva Trains Wales services were exclusively operated by diesel trains. This was largely due to there being no electrified railway lines in Wales at the time of the franchise. Arriva Trains Wales operated a fleet of 125 diesel multiple units. It also leased three locomotive-haul units for express services between Holyhead and Cardiff, and had occasionally used hired-in locomotives to run extra services for sporting events.

ATW inherited a fleet of Class 142, 143, 150, 153, 158 and 175s from Wales & Borders. The Class 175s were a common-user fleet, with 11 required by First TransPennine Express each day.

In the early years of the franchise, ATW operated locomotive-hauled services using Mark 2 carriages on services from Cardiff Central to Rhymney and Fishguard Harbour hauled by English Welsh & Scottish Class 37s and FiftyFund Class 50s, and from Crewe and Manchester Piccadilly to Holyhead hauled by Freightliner Class 47s and Virgin Trains Class 57s. ATW built up a fleet of 20 Mark 2 carriages to operate these; all had been withdrawn by 2007, most of them being stored at Long Marston.

Following the delivery of new stock to First TransPennine Express in 2006, all of the Class 175s became available to ATW, resulting in 16 Class 158s being released for transfer to other operators.

In 2006, heritage unit 121032 was purchased by ATW for use on the Cardiff Bay Shuttle. The unit was overhauled by LNWR, Crewe, entering service with ATW on 17 August 2006. In 2013, the unit suffered an engine failure. This could not be rectified, meaning that the unit was withdrawn. It was then used as a source of spare parts by sister company Chiltern Railways.

In November 2007, another nine Class 150s were transferred from Central Trains. From February 2008, five Class 150s (150278-282) were subleased to First Great Western. This was later reduced to four and then two, the last examples being returned during 2011.

In December 2008, the loco-hauled Holyhead to Cardiff Premier Service was inaugurated. It was initially hauled by Class 57s on hire from Virgin Trains, initially in top-and-tail formation and later singularly, hauling three standard class MK2s and a MK3 first/buffet. Four Class 57s were repainted at Cardiff Canton and six Mark 2s were refreshed at Eastleigh Works. During March 2012, newer Class 67 locomotives took over from the Class 57s, and Mark 3 carriages refurbished by Pullman Rail replaced the older Mark 2s in October 2012. From October 2011 until August 2012, 150280 was subleased to National Express East Anglia/Abellio Greater Anglia. In December 2014, a further Mark 3 set was introduced on services from Manchester Piccadilly-Holyhead/Llandudno.

Fleet at the end of franchise
Family	Class	Image	Type	Top Speed		Number	Routes Operated	Built
Family	Class	Image	Type	mph	km/h	Number	Routes Operated	Built
Premier Service	67		Loco	125	200	3	Holyhead–Cardiff Central; Holyhead (Llandudno)–Manchester Piccadilly	1999–2000
Premier Service	Mark 3		Coach	125	200	12	Holyhead–Cardiff Central; Holyhead (Llandudno)–Manchester Piccadilly	1975–1988
Premier Service	Driving Van Trailer		Control car	125	200	3	Holyhead–Cardiff Central; Holyhead (Llandudno)–Manchester Piccadilly	1988
Pacer	142		DMU	75	121	15	Valley Lines & Cardiff Local Routes	1985–1987
Pacer	143		DMU	75	121	15	Valley Lines & Cardiff Local Routes	1985–1986
Sprinter	150/2		DMU	75	121	36	Cardiff Local Routes; Heart of Wales/West Wales Lines; Regional services between South and West Wales, North West and South West England	1986–1987
Sprinter	153 Super Sprinter		DMU	75	121	8	Cardiff Local Routes; Heart of Wales/West Wales Lines; Regional services between South and West Wales, North West and South West England	1987–1988
Sprinter	158/0 Express Sprinter		DMU	90	140	24	Birmingham International–Aberystwyth; Regional services between South and North Wales, North West and South West England	1990–1991
Alstom Coradia	175 Coradia 1000		DMU	100	161	27	Regional services between North West England, North and South Wales	1999–2001

Past fleet
Class	Image	Type	Top Speed		Built	Withdrawn
Class	Image	Type	mph	km/h	Built	Withdrawn
121		DMU	70	112	1960	2013
57/3		Loco	95	153	1964–1967 (rebuilt 1998–2004)	2012
Mark 2		Coach	100	160	1972–1975	2007–2012

== Depots ==
Arriva Trains Wales' fleet were stabled at three depots.

- Chester (Alstom): Class 175
- Cardiff Canton: Class 142, Class 143, Class 150, Class 153 and Mark 3 stock.
- Machynlleth: Class 158

== Demise ==
During the mid-2010s, as Arriva Trains Wales' 15-year franchise period came towards its scheduled end date, the process to select a successor was started. In October 2016, Abellio, Arriva, KeolisAmey and MTR Corporation were shortlisted to bid for the next franchise. During September 2017, the formal Invitation to Tender was issued.

During October 2017, it was announced that Arriva was voluntarily withdrawing itself from the tendering process; the decision was reportedly viewed by some politicians as having raised questions about the franchise process. In February 2018, rival firm Abellio also opted to withdraw, which was largely due to its partner company Carillion having effectively collapsed and entered liquidation one month earlier.

On 23 May 2018, it was announced that KeolisAmey Wales has been selected to operate the next Wales & Borders franchise, which was set to run for 15 years, following the expiry of Arriva Trains Wales' franchise.

Preceded by Wales and Borders	Operator of Wales & Borders franchise 2003–2018	Succeeded by KeolisAmey Wales
