= KeolisAmey =

Light rail-operating joint venture

KeolisAmey is a joint venture between French transportation company Keolis and British infrastructure support provider Amey that operates the Docklands Light Railway in London, the Metrolink in Manchester and the Luas tram system in Dublin, Ireland.

== Operations ==
In December 2014, KeolisAmey Docklands commenced operating the Docklands Light Railway concession, taking over from Serco. KeolisAmey Docklands was awarded Train Operator of the Year in 2018 and 2023. Upon being retendered, KeolisAmey Docklands successfully retained the concession for a further eight years from April 2025.

In July 2017, KeolisAmey commenced operating the Manchester Metrolink concession taking over from RATP. KeolisAmey Metrolink's contract was later extended until July 2027. In 2024 and 2025, KeolisAmey Metrolink was awarded UK Operator of the Year at the Global Light Rail Awards.

In September 2026 KeolisAmey took over the operation of the Luas light rail network in Dublin from Transdev.

=== Previous ===
In October 2018, KeolisAmey Wales commenced operating the Wales & Borders franchise taking over from Arriva Trains Wales. After the franchise became unviable during the COVID-19 pandemic, it was nationalised in February 2021 with the Welsh Government‘s Transport for Wales Rail taking over. Amey retained responsibility for some infrastructure projects.
