= KeolisAmey Wales =

Welsh train operator (2018–2021)

Transport for Wales; Trafnidiaeth Cymru

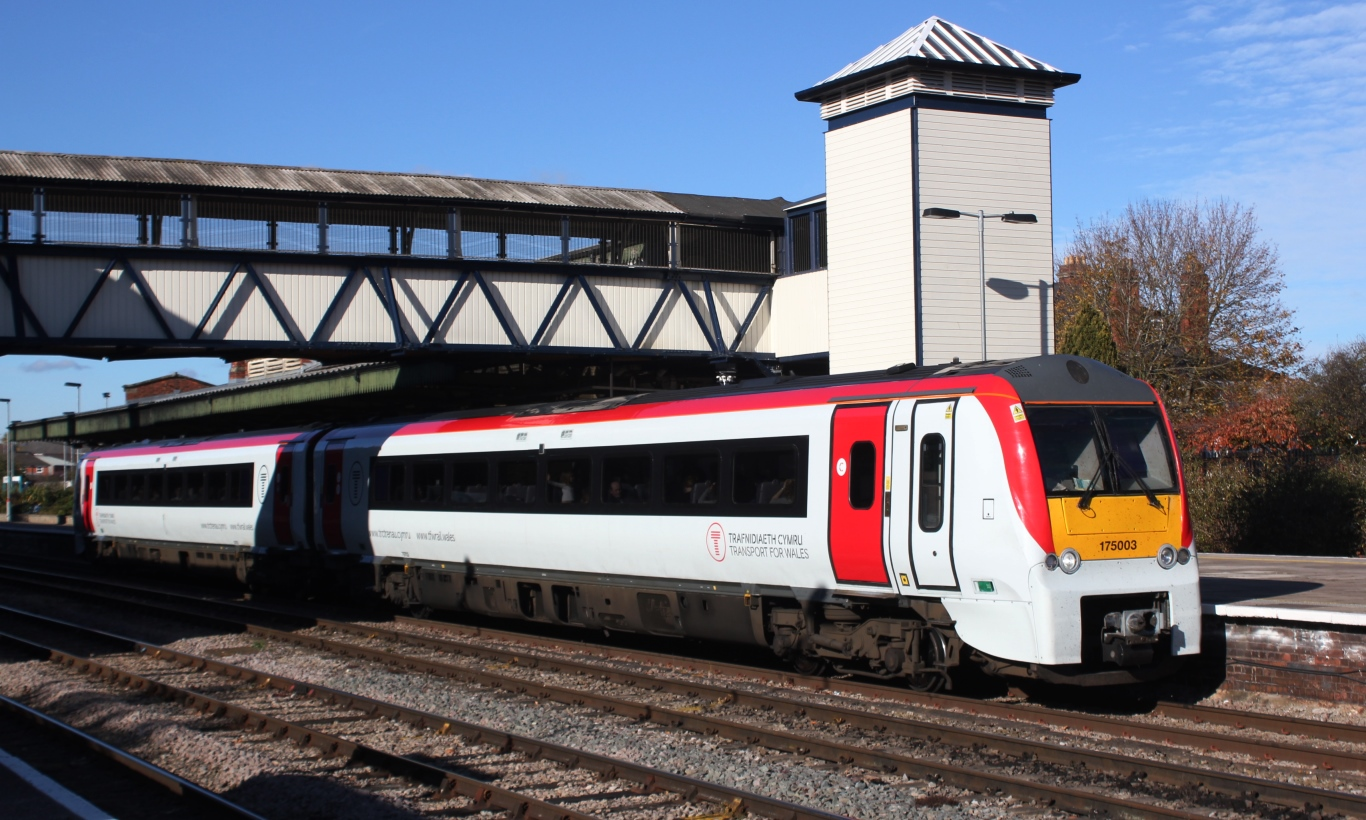
- A Class 175 Coradia 1000 at Hereford

Overview
- Franchises: Wales & Borders; 14 October 2018 – 6 February 2021
- Main area: Wales
- Other areas: North West England; West Midlands; Gloucestershire
- Stations operated: 247
- Parent company: KeolisAmey
- Reporting mark: AW
- Dates of operation: 2018–2021
- Predecessor: Arriva Trains Wales
- Successor: Transport for Wales Rail

Technical
- Track gauge: 1,435 mm (4 ft 8 1/2 in)

Other
- Website: tfwrail.wales

Keolis Amey Operations (Welsh: Gweithrediadau Keolis Amey), trading as Transport for Wales Rail Services (TfW Rail Services) was a Welsh train operating company owned by KeolisAmey that operated the Wales & Borders franchise between October 2018 and February 2021.

The Welsh Government body Transport for Wales awarded the contract for the Wales and Borders franchise to KeolisAmey in 2018 which commenced rail operations on 14 October 2018. KeolisAmey used the brand names Transport for Wales and TfW Rail (Welsh: Trafnidiaeth Cymru and TrC Trenau), which are owned by the Welsh Government, for day-to-day operations. The Welsh Government nationalised the franchise on 7 February 2021, transferring operations to Transport for Wales Rail, although Amey continues to provide an infrastructural role in the franchise, particularly on the South Wales Metro.

== History ==
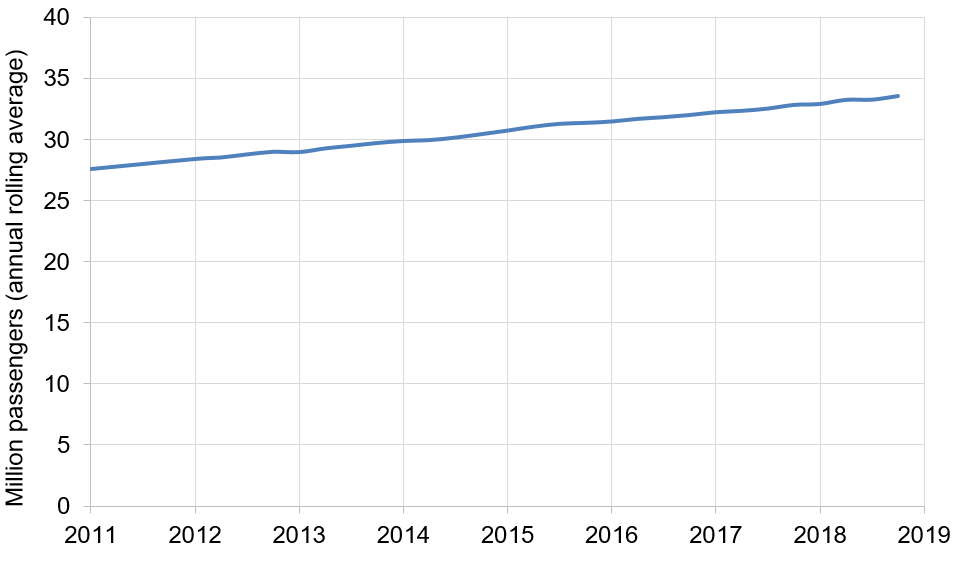
Passenger journeys on the Wales & Borders franchise from 2010–11 to 2018–19.

In October 2016 four bids were shortlisted for the next Wales & Borders franchise: Abellio, the incumbent operator Arriva, KeolisAmey and MTR Corporation.

In October 2017, Arriva withdrew from the bidding process, followed in February 2018 by Abellio, after the collapse of its partner Carillion. In May 2018, the franchise was awarded to KeolisAmey Wales. It commenced on 14 October 2018 and it was to run for 15 years.

Unlike the previous franchise, which was awarded by the Department for Transport, this franchise was awarded by Transport for Wales, on behalf of the Welsh Government.

In January 2020 KeolisAmey was fined £2.3 million by the Welsh government for poor performance of rail services. The company was also expected to be criticised by the Welsh Language Commissioner later in 2020 for reportedly breaking legislation on Welsh language provision six times since taking over the franchise in 2018. KeolisAmey Wales told the BBC that it did not believe any rules had been broken. Complaints included that Welsh was given lesser treatment on self-service machines, websites, and on the mobile app, that correspondence was not issued fully in Welsh, that train tickets were printed only in English, and that station and train announcements were not always made bilingually.

With a collapse in revenues, and a significant reduction in passenger numbers as a result of the COVID-19 pandemic having made the original franchise financially unviable, on 7 February 2021 the franchise was taken over by the Welsh Government's operator of last resort, Transport for Wales Rail, a subsidiary of Transport for Wales, with Amey Infrastructure having an involvement in delivering some key projects such as the Core Valley Lines.

== Services ==
Typical TfW weekday off-peak service was as follows:

North Wales Coast Line
Route	tph	Calling at	
Cardiff Central to Holyhead	8tpd	Newport, Cwmbran, Pontypool & New Inn, Abergavenny, Hereford, Leominster (3tpd), Ludlow (7tpd), Craven Arms (7tpd), Church Stretton (7tpd), Shrewsbury, Gobowen (7tpd), Chirk (7tpd), Ruabon (7tpd), Wrexham General, Chester, Shotton (4tpd), Flint, Prestatyn (7tpd), Rhyl, Abergele & Pensarn (3tpd), Colwyn Bay, Llandudno Junction, Conwy (3tpd), Penmaenmawr (3tpd), Llanfairfechan (3tpd), Bangor (7tpd), Llanfairpwll (7tpd), Bodorgan (5tpd), Ty Croes (5tpd), Rhosneigr (5tpd) and Valley (5tpd). Only 7 tpd terminate in Holyhead as one turns off at Llandudno Junction and terminates at Llandudno, calling at Deganwy en route.	
Cardiff Central to Holyhead	1tpd	Newport, Cwmbran (Holyhead-bound only), Pontypool (Holyhead-bound only), Abergavenny (Holyhead-bound only), Hereford, Ludlow (Cardiff-bound only), Shrewsbury, Wrexham General, Chester, Flint, Rhyl, Colwyn Bay, Llandudno Junction and Bangor; 0534 from Holyhead and 1716 from Cardiff Central is the Premier Service which calls at fewer stops and has 1st class accommodation available with meals included.	
Birmingham International to Holyhead	1tp2h	Birmingham New Street, Smethwick Galton Bridge, Wolverhampton, Telford Central, Wellington, Shrewsbury, Gobowen, Chirk, Ruabon, Wrexham General, Chester, Flint, Prestatyn, Rhyl, Colwyn Bay, Llandudno Junction, Conwy, Penmaenmawr, Llanfairfechan and Bangor	
Manchester Airport to Llandudno	1	East Didsbury, Manchester Piccadilly, Manchester Oxford Road, Newton-le-Willows, Earlestown, Warrington Bank Quay, Runcorn East, Frodsham, Helsby, Chester, Shotton, Flint, Prestatyn, Rhyl, Abergele & Pensarn, Colwyn Bay, Llandudno Junction and Deganwy; 6 inter-peak trains each day begin/end at the airport, 1 early morning and 2 late evening trains do too, not calling at East Didsbury. Other trains begin at Manchester Piccadilly.	
Crewe to Chester	1	shuttle	
Chester to Liverpool Lime Street	1	Helsby, Frodsham, Runcorn and Liverpool South Parkway	
South Wales – Manchester
Route	tph	Calling at	
Milford Haven to Manchester Piccadilly	1tp2h	Johnston, Haverfordwest, Clarbeston Road, Clunderwen, Whitland, Carmarthen, Pembrey & Burry Port, Llanelli, Gowerton, Swansea, Neath, Port Talbot Parkway, Bridgend, Cardiff Central, Newport, Cwmbran, Abergavenny, Hereford, Leominster, Ludlow, Shrewsbury, Crewe, Wilmslow and Stockport	
Carmarthen to Manchester Piccadilly	1tp2h	Ferryside, Kidwelly, Pembrey & Burry Port, Llanelli, Gowerton, Swansea, Neath, Port Talbot Parkway, Bridgend, Pencoed, Llanharan, Pontyclun, Cardiff Central, Newport, Cwmbran, Abergavenny, Hereford, Leominster, Ludlow, Craven Arms, Church Stretton, Shrewsbury, Whitchurch, Nantwich, Crewe, Wilmslow and Stockport	
Fishguard Harbour to Manchester Piccadilly	1tpd	Fishguard and Goodwick, Clarbeston Road, Whitland, Carmarthen, Pembrey & Burry Port, Llanelli, Gowerton, Swansea, Neath, Port Talbot Parkway, Bridgend, Pencoed, Llanharan, Pontyclun, Cardiff Central, Newport, Cwmbran, Abergavenny, Hereford, Leominster, Ludlow, Craven Arms, Church Stretton, Shrewsbury, Whitchurch, Nantwich, Crewe, Wilmslow and Stockport	
Cambrian Line
Route	tph	Calling at	
Birmingham International to Aberystwyth and Pwllheli	1tp2h	Birmingham New Street, Smethwick Galton Bridge, Wolverhampton, Telford Central, Wellington, Shrewsbury, Welshpool, Newtown, Caersws, Machynlleth... The two portions divide/attach at Machynlleth.	
Birmingham International to Aberystwyth and Pwllheli	1tp2h	Aberystwyth portion: Dovey Junction, Borth and Bow Street	Pwllheli portion: Dovey Junction, Penhelig, Aberdovey, Tywyn, Tonfanau, Llwyngwril, Fairbourne, Morfa Mawddach, Barmouth, Llanaber, Talybont, Dyffryn Ardudwy, Llanbedr, Pensarn, Llandanwg, Harlech, Tygwyn, Talsarnau, Llandecwyn, Penrhyndeudraeth, Minffordd, Porthmadog, Criccieth, Penychain and Abererch
Shrewsbury to Aberystwyth	-	Welshpool, Newtown, Caersws, Machynlleth, Dovey Junction, Borth and Bow Street; Additional trains that run so that there is a service most hours between Shrewsbury and Aberystwyth	
Heart of Wales Line
Route	tpd	Calling at	
Carmarthen to Llandovery	1	Llanelli, Bynea, Llangennech, Pontarddulais, Pantyffynnon, Ammanford, Llandybie, Ffairfach, Llandeilo, Llangadog and Llanwrda	
Llandrindod to Crewe	1	Pen-y-Bont, Dolau, Llanbister Road, Llangynllo, Knucklas, Knighton, Bucknell, Hopton Heath, Broome, Craven Arms, Church Stretton, Shrewsbury, Yorton, Wem, Prees, Whitchurch, Wrenbury and Nantwich	
Swansea to Shrewsbury and Crewe	4	Gowerton, Llanelli, Bynea, Llangennech, Pontarddulais, Pantyffynnon, Ammanford, Llandybie, Ffairfach, Llandeilo, Llangadog, Llanwrda, Llandovery, Cynghordy, Sugar Loaf, Llanwrtyd, Llangammarch, Garth, Cilmeri, Builth Road, Llandrindod, Pen-y-Bont, Dolau, Llanbister Road, Llangynllo, Knucklas, Knighton, Bucknell, Hopton Heath, Broome, Craven Arms and Church Stretton; 2tpd extend to/from Crewe, calling at Yorton, Wem, Prees, Whitchurch, Wrenbury and Nantwich	
Shrewsbury to Crewe	5	Yorton, Wem, Prees, Whitchurch, Wrenbury and Nantwich creates an every-2-hours service alongside trains beginning further south	
Conwy Valley Line
Route	tpd	Calling at	
Blaenau Ffestiniog to Llandudno	6	Roman Bridge, Dolwyddelan, Pont-y-Pant, Betws-y-Coed, Llanrwst, North Llanrwst, Dolgarrog, Tal-y-Cafn, Glan Conwy, Llandudno Junction and Deganwy	
Borderlands Line
Route	tph	Calling at	
Wrexham Central to Bidston	1	Wrexham General, Gwersyllt, Cefn-y-Bedd, Caergwrle, Hope, Penyffordd, Buckley, Hawarden, Shotton, Hawarden Bridge, Neston, Heswall and Upton	
West Wales Locals
Route	tph	Calling at	
Pembroke Dock to Swansea	1tp2h	Pembroke, Lamphey, Manorbier, Penally, Tenby, Saundersfoot, Kilgetty, Narberth, Whitland, Carmarthen, Pembrey & Burry Port, and Llanelli	
Fishguard Harbour to Swansea	1tp2h	Fishguard and Goodwick, Clarbeston Road, Clunderwen, Whitland, Carmarthen, Pembrey & Burry Port and Llanelli	
Swanline
Route	tph	Calling at	
Swansea to Cardiff Central	1tp2h	Llansamlet, Skewen, Neath, Briton Ferry, Baglan, Port Talbot Parkway, Pyle, Bridgend, Pencoed and Pontyclun	
West Wales-Gloucestershire Line
Route	tph	Calling at	
Maesteg to Cheltenham Spa	1	Maesteg (Ewenny Road), Garth, Tondu, Sarn, Wildmill, Bridgend, Pencoed, Llanharan, Pontyclun, Cardiff Central, Newport, Severn Tunnel Junction, Caldicot, Chepstow, Lydney and Gloucester; Some trains terminate at Cardiff Central, rather than Cheltenham Spa. doesn't run when Fishguard - Gloucester service runs	
Fishguard Harbour to Gloucester	4tpd	Fishguard and Goodwick, Clarbeston Road, Clunderwen, Whitland, Carmarthen, Ferryside, Kidwelly, Pembrey & Burry Port, Llanelli, Gowerton, Swansea, Neath, Port Talbot Parkway, Bridgend, Pencoed, Llanharan, Pontyclun, Cardiff Central, Newport, Severn Tunnel Junction, Caldicot, Chepstow and Lydney; Some trains terminate at Cardiff Central, rather than Gloucester.	
Ebbw Valley Railway
Route	tph	Calling at	
Cardiff Central to Ebbw Vale Town	1	Pye Corner, Rogerstone, Risca & Pontymister, Crosskeys, Newbridge, Llanhilleth and Ebbw Vale Parkway	
Rhymney Line
Route	tph	Calling at	
Penarth to Bargoed and Rhymney	4	Dingle Road, Grangetown, Cardiff Central, Cardiff Queen Street, Heath High Level, Llanishen, Lisvane & Thornhill, Caerphilly, Aber, Energlyn & Churchill Park (2tph), Llanbradach, Ystrad Mynach, Hengoed, Pengam, and Gilfach Fargoed (1tph). 1tph extends to Rhymney, calling at Brithdir, Tir-Phil and Pontlottyn	
Merthyr & Vale of Glamorgan Lines
Route	tph	Calling at	
Bridgend to Aberdare	1	Llantwit Major, Rhoose Cardiff International Airport, Barry, Barry Docks, Cadoxton, Dinas Powys, Eastbrook, Cogan, Grangetown, Cardiff Central, Cardiff Queen Street, Cathays, Llandaf, Radyr, Taffs Well, Trefforest, Pontypridd, Abercynon, Penrhiwceiber, Mountain Ash, Fernhill and Cwmbach	
Barry Island to Aberdare	1	Barry, Barry Docks, Cadoxton, Dinas Powys, Eastbrook, Cogan, Grangetown, Cardiff Central, Cardiff Queen Street, Cathays, Llandaf, Radyr, Taffs Well, Trefforest, Pontypridd, Abercynon, Penrhiwceiber, Mountain Ash, Fernhill and Cwmbach	
Barry Island to Merthyr Tydfil	2	Barry, Barry Docks, Cadoxton, Dinas Powys, Eastbrook, Cogan, Grangetown, Cardiff Central, Cardiff Queen Street, Cathays, Llandaf, Radyr, Taffs Well, Trefforest Estate, Trefforest, Pontypridd, Abercynon, Quakers Yard, Merthyr Vale, Troed-y-rhiw and Pentre-bach	
Rhondda Line
Route	tph	Calling at	
Cardiff Central to Treherbert	2	Cardiff Queen Street, Cathays, Llandaf, Radyr, Taffs Well, Trefforest, Pontypridd, Trehafod, Porth, Dinas Rhondda, Tonypandy, Llwynypia, Ystrad Rhondda, Ton Pentre, Treorchy and Ynyswen	
City & Coryton Lines
Route	tph	Calling at	
Radyr to Coryton	2	Danescourt, Fairwater, Waun-gron Park, Ninian Park, Cardiff Central, Cardiff Queen Street, Heath Low Level, Ty Glas, Birchgrove, Rhiwbina and Whitchurch	
Butetown Branch Line
Route	tph	Calling at	
Cardiff Queen Street to Cardiff Bay	5	shuttle	

== Rolling stock ==
KeolisAmey Wales inherited a fleet of Class 142, Class 143, Class 150, Class 153, Class 158, Class 175s diesel multiple units and Mark 3 carriages from Arriva Trains Wales in October 2018.

In 2019 and 2020, more Class 153 units, Class 170 units and Mark 4 carriages were acquired from other operators. In November 2020, the first three Class 769 units entered service. These allowed for the Class 142 and Mark 3 sets to be withdrawn.

=== Class 143 Pacer ===
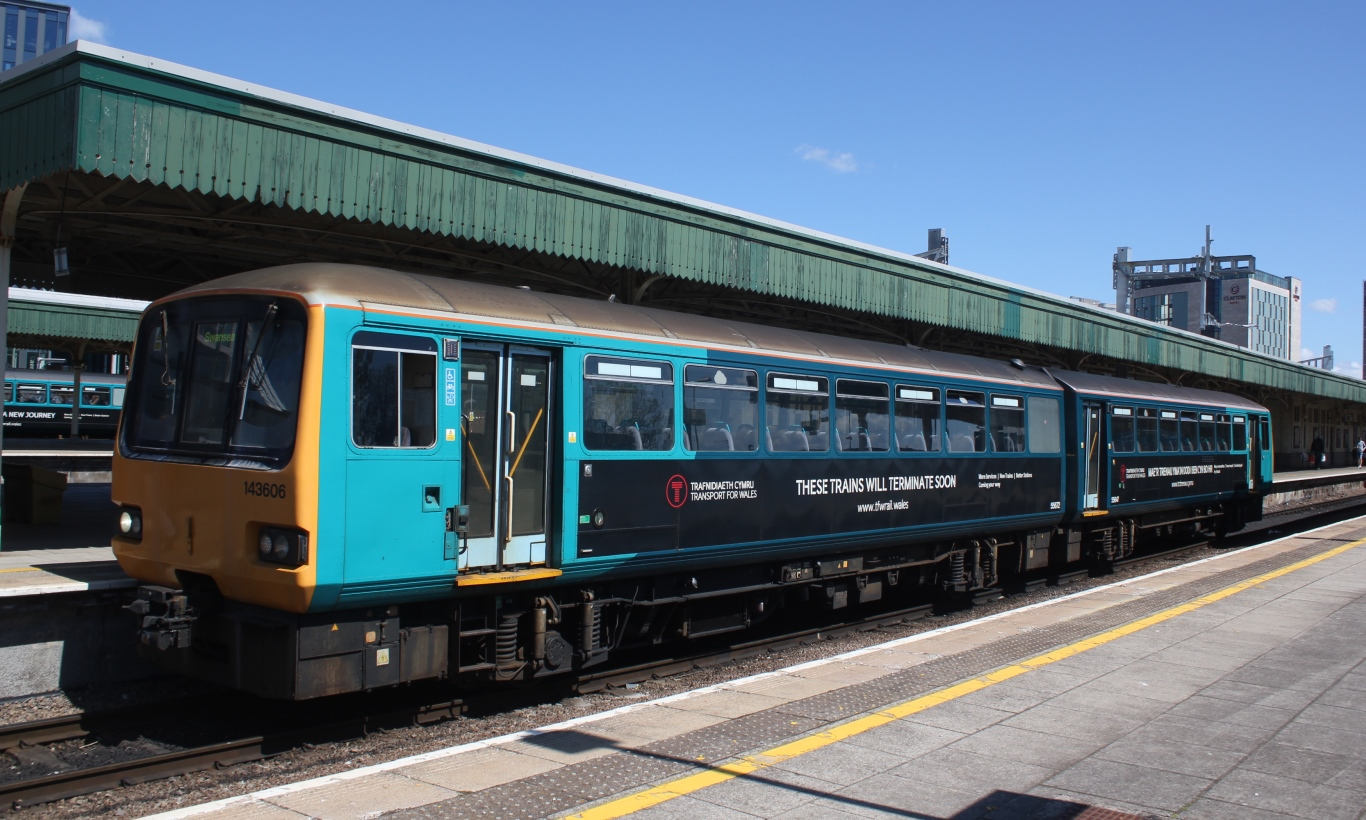
Class 143 Pacer at Cardiff Central in 2019 with "These trains will terminate soon" branding

KeolisAmey Wales operated 15 Class 143 units. All had advertising vinyls applied, with the messages 'The start of a new journey', 'The journey is almost over for old trains', and 'These trains will terminate soon', stating rolling stock, infrastructure and service improvements.

From 1 January 2021, the Class 143 units were only able to operate coupled to (a) PRM-compliant unit(s), and the toilets were locked out of use due to Network Rail no longer wanting waste from non-tanked toilets being dropped onto their tracks. The last Class 143 unit ran in May 2021.

=== Class 150, 158 and 175 DMUs ===
KeolisAmey Wales operated 36 Class 150, 24 Class 158 and 27 Class 175 units.

=== Class 153 Super Sprinters ===
In April 2019, KeolisAmey Wales added five 153 units acquired from Great Western Railway to the eight it previously had. Four of these entered service the following month, while the fifth entered service on 21 October 2019 as the first 153 on the whole GB rail network with PRM modifications.

In October 2019, Porterbrook announced that it would lease a further nine Class 153 units to KeolisAmey Wales for use on a short-term basis. These comprise five units from Greater Anglia which entered service in January 2020, and four units from East Midlands Railway which entered service in February 2020. In November 2020, two more units arrived from East Midlands Railway.

=== Class 170 Turbostars ===
In September 2019, KeolisAmey Wales took delivery of the first of 12 Class 170 Turbostar DMUs from Abellio Greater Anglia. As of 2020, Transport for Wales operated the 12 Class 170 units on the Maesteg/Cardiff/Ebbw Vale-Cheltenham routes.

=== Class 769 Flex ===
Nine Class 769 Flex bi-mode multiple units were due to be delivered by 2019, following conversion from Class 319 electric multiple units, by fitting diesel generators and extra electronic equipment to some previously unused below-solebar space. The first three units entered service in November and December 2020.

=== Fleet at end of franchise ===
Family	Class	Image	Type	Top Speed		Carriages	Number	Routes Operated	Built
Family	Class	Image	Type	mph	km/h	Carriages	Number	Routes Operated	Built
Locomotive hauled stock
Premier Service	67		Loco	125	200	–	6	Holyhead-Cardiff Central; Holyhead (Llandudno)-Manchester Piccadilly	1999–2000
Diesel multiple units
Pacer	143		DMU	75	121	2	15	Valley Lines & Cardiff local routes	1985–1986
Sprinter	150		DMU	75	121	2	36	Valley Lines & Cardiff local routes; Heart of Wales/West Wales lines; Regional services between South and West Wales, North West and South West England	1986–1987
Sprinter	153 Super Sprinter		DMU	75	121	1	24	Valley Lines & Cardiff local routes; Heart of Wales/West Wales lines; Regional services between South and West Wales, North West and South West England	1987–1988
Sprinter	158 Express Sprinter		DMU	90	140	2	24	Cambrian line; Regional services between South and North Wales, North West and South West England	1990–1991
Bombardier Turbostar	170		DMU	100	161	2	4	Maesteg Line; Ebbw Valley Railway; South Wales Main Line	2002
Bombardier Turbostar	170		DMU	100	161	3	8	Maesteg Line; Ebbw Valley Railway; South Wales Main Line	1999
Alstom Coradia	175 Coradia 1000		DMU	100	161	2	11	Regional services between North West England, North and South Wales	1999–2001
Alstom Coradia	175 Coradia 1000		DMU	100	161	3	16	Regional services between North West England, North and South Wales	1999–2001
Bi-mode multiple units
BR Second Generation (Mark 3)	769 Flex		BMU	100	161	4	3	Valley Lines	2019–2020 (Note: Class 319/4 units were initially built between 1987 and 1988)

=== Train maintenance depots ===
KeolisAmey Wales's fleet was stored and maintained at the following depots.

- Cardiff Canton: Class 143, 150, 153, 170 and 769s and locomotive-hauled trains
- Chester (Alstom): Class 175s
- Machynlleth: Class 158s
- Holyhead: Stabling point (refuelling and light maintenance) for locomotive-hauled trains and DMUs
- Crewe Carriage Sidings (Arriva TrainCare): Class 150, Class 153 and Class 158 units, and locomotive-hauled trains. Stabling point and light maintenance.

Due to space limitations, Chrysalis Rail allowed KeolisAmey Wales to store any unallocated units or carriages at its Landore TMD in Swansea, even if they were not being worked on.

=== Past fleet ===
From June 2019 to March 2020, KeolisAmey Wales hired two Class 37-hauled Mark 2 sets to temporarily operate rush-hour services between Cardiff and Rhymney to add capacity. From January 2020 they were operating under PRM non-compliance dispensation, but were withdrawn in March due to decreasing reliability and replaced with trains formed of multiple Class 153 railcars coupled together, with many more of those in the fleet.

In July 2020, all of KeolisAmey Wales's Mark 3 stock (which had been inherited from Arriva Trains Wales) went off lease and into storage at Long Marston.

Class	Image	Type	Top Speed		Carriages	Number	Routes Operated	Withdrawn	Built
Class	Image	Type	mph	km/h	Carriages	Number	Routes Operated	Withdrawn	Built
Locomotive hauled stock
37		Loco	80	129	–	3	Rhymney Line	March 2020	1960–1965
Mark 2		Coach	100	161	–	10	Rhymney Line	March 2020	1963–1975
Mark 3		Coach	125	201	–	12	Holyhead–Cardiff Central; Holyhead (Llandudno)–Manchester Piccadilly	July 2020	1975–1988
Driving Van Trailer		Control car	125	201	–	3	Holyhead–Cardiff Central; Holyhead (Llandudno)–Manchester Piccadilly	July 2020	1988–1990
Diesel multiple units
142 Pacer		DMU	75	121	2	15	Valley Lines & Cardiff local routes	September–December 2020	1985–1987

== Notes ==
Preceded by Arriva Trains Wales	Operator of Wales & Borders franchise 2018–2021	Succeeded by Transport for Wales Rail
