= Transport for Wales =

Transport authority in Wales

- Trafnidiaeth Cymru
- Abbreviation: TfW
- Predecessor: Strategic Rail Authority (2001–2005); Welsh Government (2005–2016)
- Formation: 1 April 2016
- Type: Private company limited by guarantee
- Legal status: Wholly owned subsidiary of the Welsh Government
- Headquarters: 3 Llys Cadwyn Pontypridd CF37 4TH
- Region served: Wales and the England–Wales border
- Field: Intermodal transport
- Owner: Welsh Government
- Chief Executive Officer: James Price
- Main organ: Wales & Borders franchise
- Subsidiaries: Transport for Wales Rail; Pullman Rail Limited; TfW Innovation Services Limited; Ffeibr
- Staff: 3,085
- Website: tfw.wales

Transport for Wales (TfW; Welsh: Trafnidiaeth Cymru; TrC) is a not-for-profit company owned by the Welsh Government and managed at arm's length by its appointed board. TfW oversees the Transport for Wales Group (TfW Group) consisting of itself and its subsidiaries: Transport for Wales Rail, the train operator of the Wales & Borders railway franchise; Pullman Rail Limited; and TfW Innovation Services Limited, a joint venture between TfW (51%) and former operator KeolisAmey Wales (49%).

TfW contracted KeolisAmey Wales in 2018 to run using the trading name Transport for Wales Rail Services. Due to a fall in passengers caused by the COVID-19 pandemic, a Welsh-government owned company, Transport for Wales Rail Limited, took over day-to-day operations of the franchise on 7 February 2021.

The company is developing the T Network, an integrated multimodal transport network across Wales, using trains, buses, walking, wheeling and cycling.

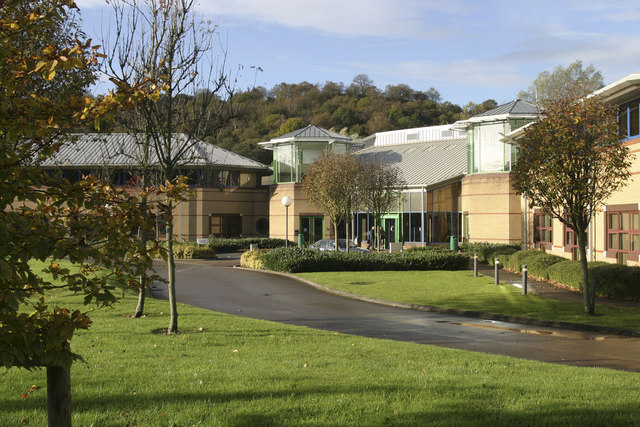
QED Centre, former registered office of TfW until 29 November 2019

== History ==
TfW was established as an arm's-length body by the Welsh Government to provide support and expertise to the transport projects in Wales. In 2017, it procured the new Operator and Development Partner for the Wales & Borders railway franchise under powers delegated to the Welsh government under the Government of Wales Act 2006.

The company introduced the Transport for Wales brand to replace the now defunct Arriva Trains Wales brand on the Wales & Borders franchise from 14 October 2018. The franchise was fully operated by KeolisAmey Wales.

In the Summer 2020 the Welsh Government withdrew the Bus Services (Wales) Bill that they were developing, which would have provided local councils with the statutory power to franchise bus routes in Wales. This was because they aimed, as part of other reasons "to utilise Transport for Wales as the main delivery and procurement body for the bus system, transferring the roles from local authorities, in return for the local authorities becoming part ‘owners’ of TfW".

On 22 October 2020, the Welsh Government announced that the Wales and Borders rail franchise was to transfer operations to a Welsh-government owned rail operator of last resort, due to the COVID-19 pandemic, all staff, operations, and branding was transferred to the new company on 7 February 2021.

On 10 August 2021, TfW announced the acquisition of Cardiff-based engineering service provider Pullman Rail Ltd from Colas Rail. TfW stated this was to ensure their Canton depot "will have the required capacity and resilience to support the introduction of TfWs flagship Metro scheme alongside new rolling stock for the Wales and Borders network."

On 25 November 2024, TfW launched TfW Ffeibr, a wholesale full fibre internet infrastructure company providing high-speed connectivity to the South Wales valleys. This infrastructure has allowed internet service providers to connect to the Ffeibr network, expanding coverage of larger bandwidths.

== Transport initiatives ==
=== Regional plans ===
TfW is responsible for the development of the South Wales, North Wales and Swansea Bay and West Wales programmes. All are multi-modal systems, integrating the heavy rail (and possibly/eventually light rail) networks with local bus services, active travel and other modes of transport.

A North-South railway has been suggested to better link North and South Wales.

=== Fflecsi ===
As part of the Welsh Government's Llwybr Newydd strategy. On 18 May 2020, Fflecsi, a demand-responsive transport service was launched in Newport in co-operation between TfW, Newport Bus and Newport City Council. The service has since expanded to multiple principal areas of Wales. Fflecsi is part of TfW's increased investment in alternative transport modes, with further expansion planned across Wales following good progress and popularity of the service in Newport and Cardiff North. In 2021, Fflecsi expanded operations to Blaenau Gwent and Flintshire, although the Newport service was discontinued from 25 September 2022.
