= Holyhead railway station =

Railway station in Anglesey, Wales

Holyhead Welsh: Caergybi
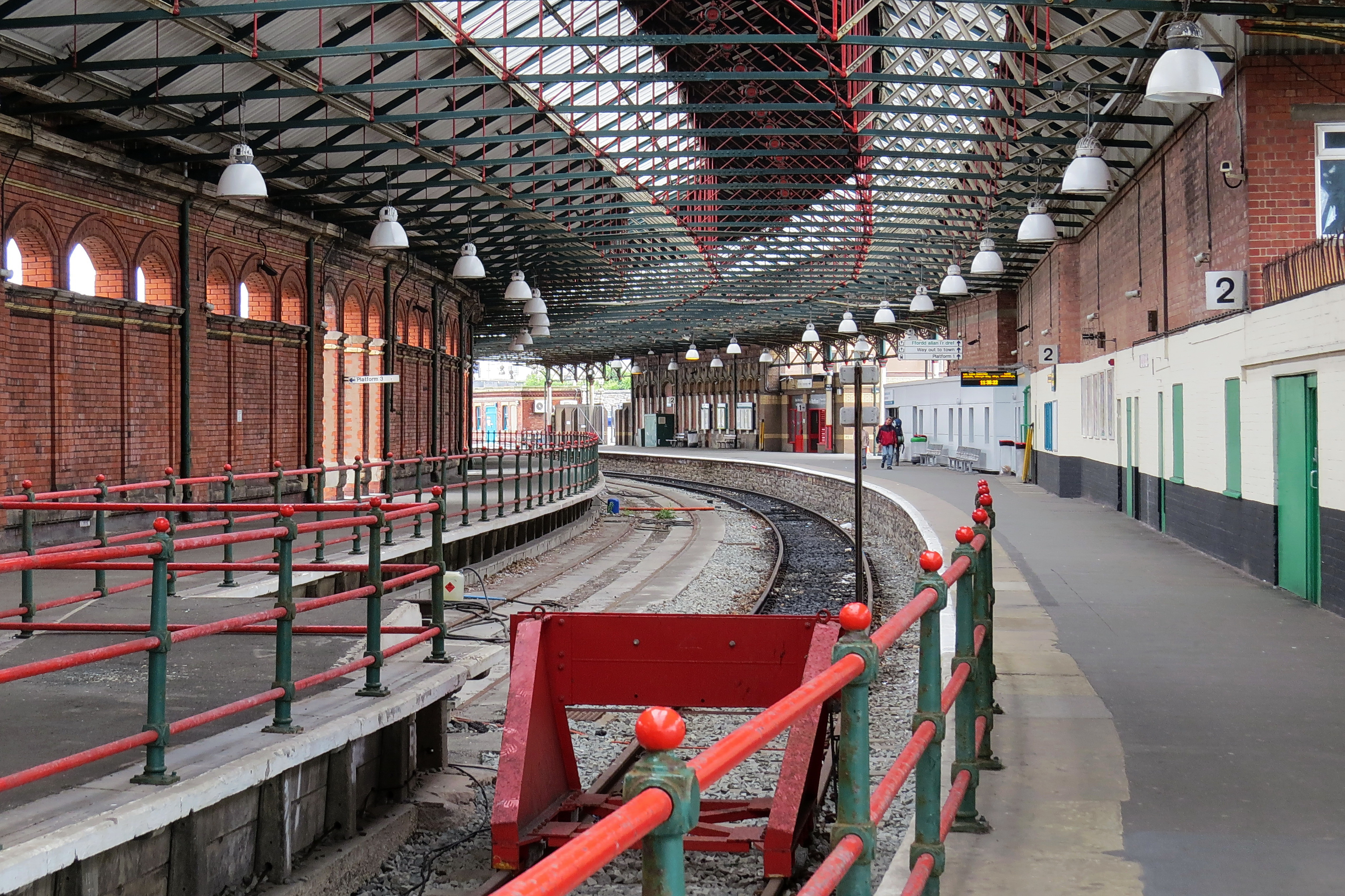

General information
- Location: Holyhead, Anglesey; Wales
- Coordinates: 53.308°N 4.631°W
- Grid reference: SH247822
- Owner: Network Rail
- Manager: Transport for Wales Rail
- Platforms: 3

Other information
- Station code: HHD
- Classification: DfT category E

History
- Original company: Chester and Holyhead Railway
- Pre-grouping: London and North Western Railway
- Post-grouping: London, Midland and Scottish Railway

Key dates
- 1 August 1848: First station opened
- 15 May 1851: Station resited
- 1 January 1866: Station resited

Passengers
- 2020/21: ▼44,462
- 2021/22: ▲0.139 million
- 2022/23: ▲0.202 million
- 2023/24: ▲0.223 million
- 2024/25: ▲0.237 million

Listed Building – Grade II
- Feature: Train Shed at Holyhead Station
- Designated: 25 July 1994
- Reference no.: 14739
Location
Notes
- Passenger statistics from the Office of Rail and Road

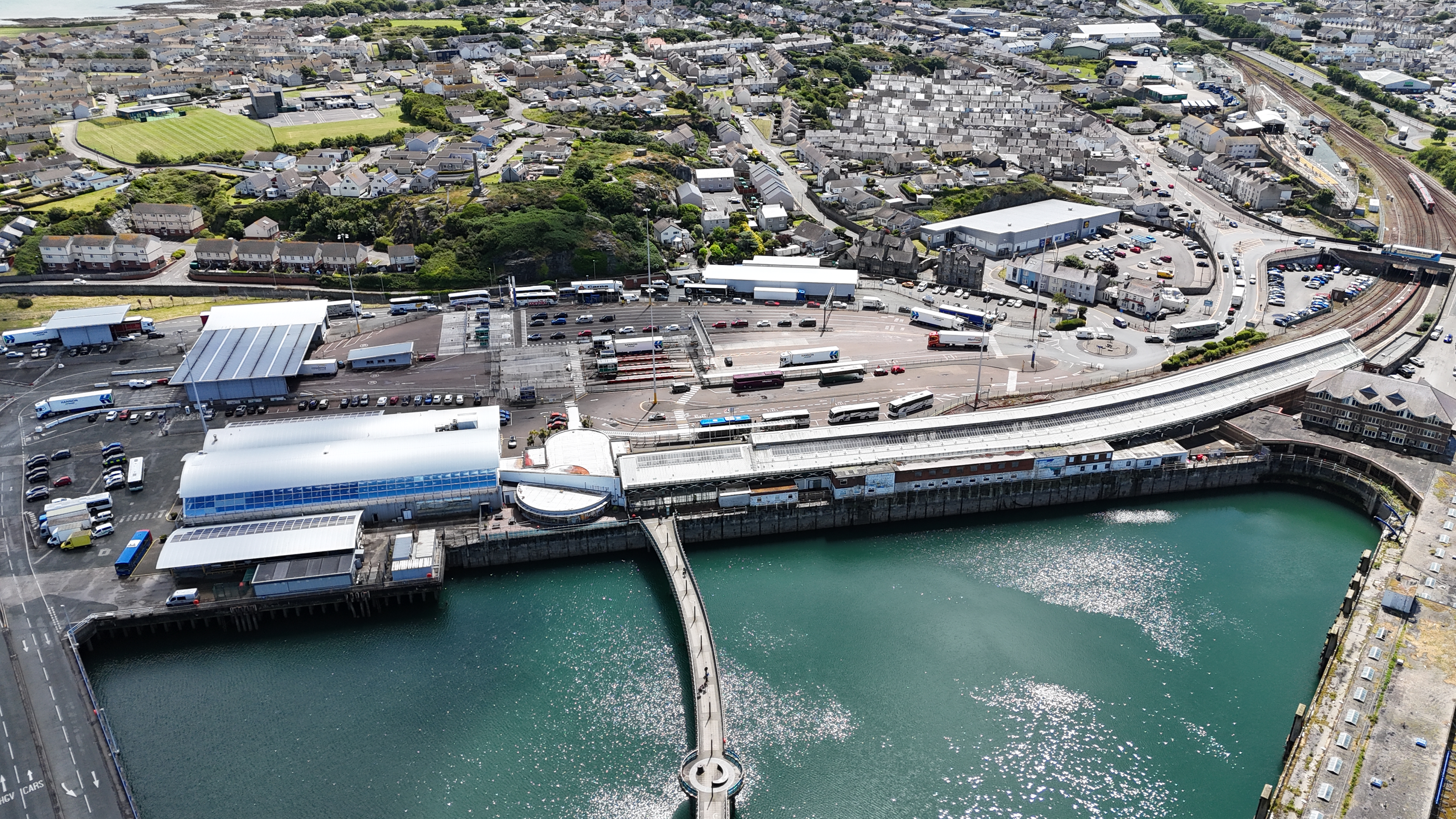
Holyhead Ferry Terminal and Holyhead Railway Station

Holyhead railway station (Welsh: Gorsaf reilffordd Caergybi) serves the Welsh town of Holyhead (Welsh: Caergybi) on Holy Island, Anglesey. The station is the western terminus of the North Wales Main Line 105 1/2 miles (170 km) west of Crewe and is managed by Transport for Wales Rail. It connects with the Port of Holyhead ferry terminal. The station is connected to the town centre by a stainless steel pedestrian/cycle bridge named The Celtic Gateway (Welsh: Porth Celtaidd).

== History ==
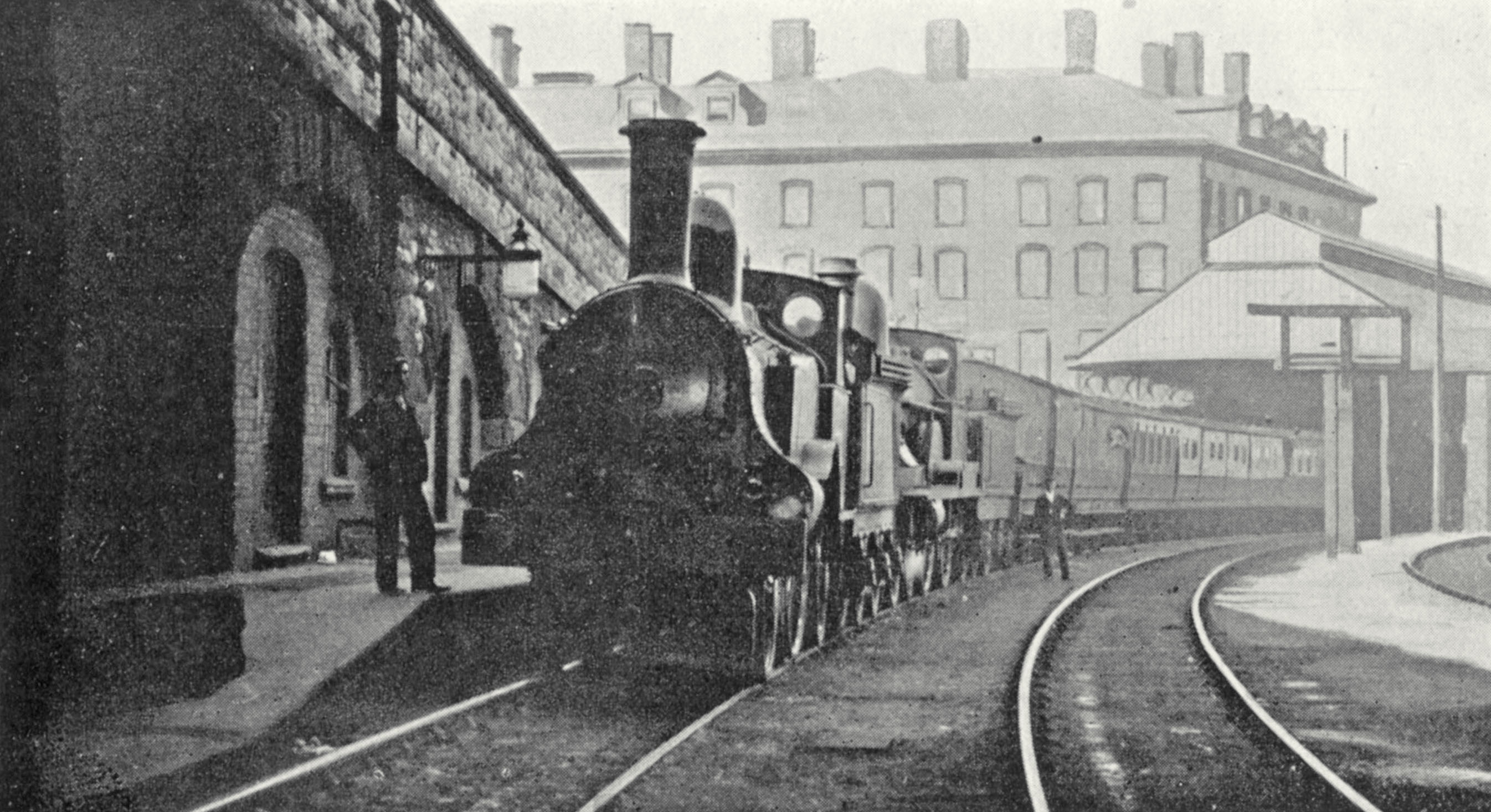
The 3.15 p.m. Irish Boat Train in Holyhead station, 1905

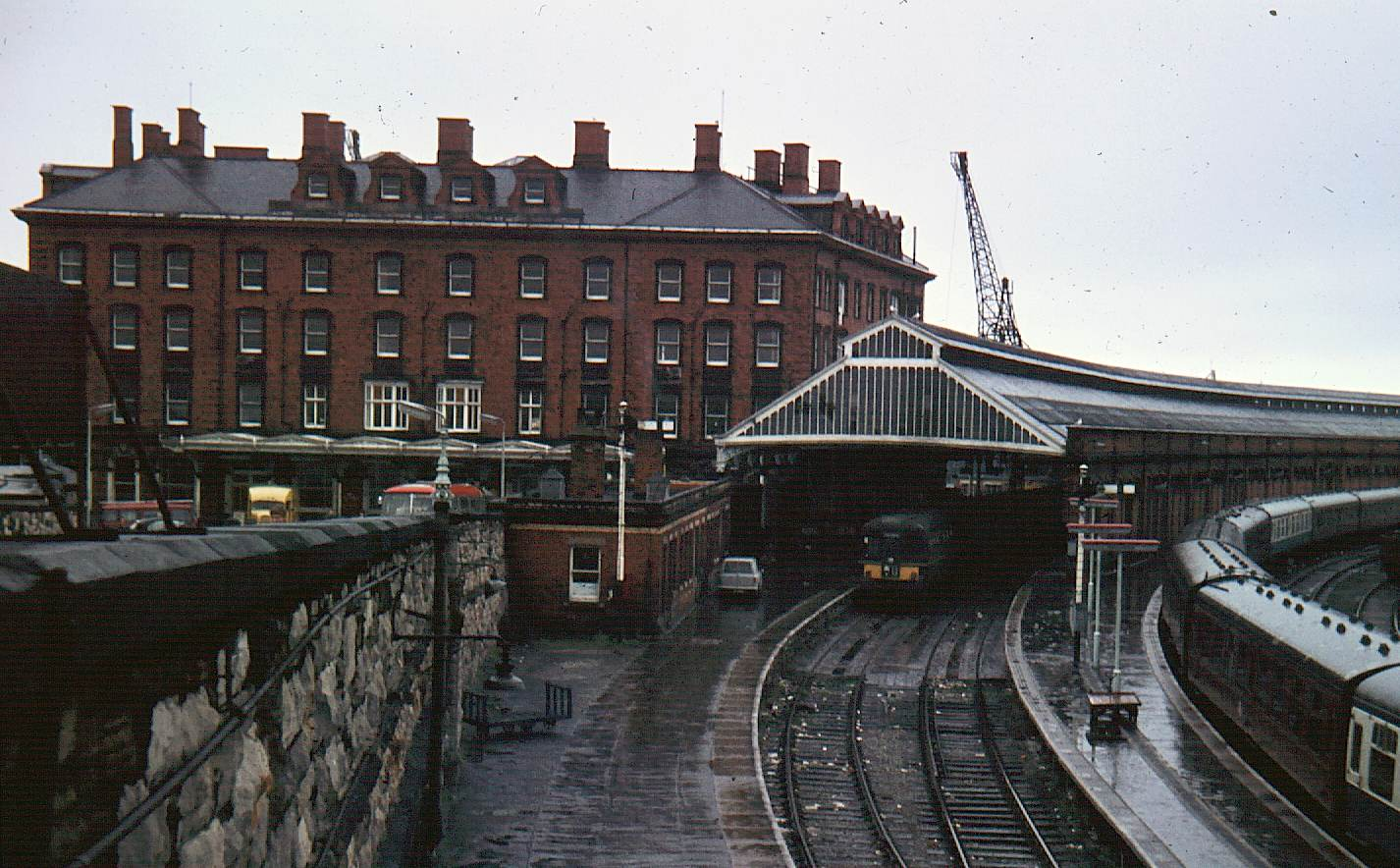
Holyhead station in September 1967 under British Rail.

The first station in Holyhead was opened by the Chester and Holyhead Railway on 1 August 1848, but this was replaced by the second on 15 May 1851.

The present station was opened by the London and North Western Railway on 17 January 1866 and still retains its overall roof. It is believed to be the longest train shed in Wales. It originally had four platforms, but only three are currently in use, the track to the former platform three having been lifted. The station approach contains a Grade II listed clock turret which was unveiled on 17 June 1878 by Albert Edward, Prince of Wales to mark completion of old harbour extension. The clock is by J. B. Joyce & Co of Whitchurch.

Platform one on the western side of the station is separated from the other two by the ferry terminal buildings and inner harbour and is the one normally used by Avanti West Coast services to London Euston. Most Transport for Wales DMU services use platform two. Platform three is outside the train shed and is used by the early morning Premier Service to Cardiff Central, plus a few other trains at busy periods. There are carriage sidings and servicing facilities alongside platform one, whilst platform three also has an engine release line & run-round loop available.

A rail-served container terminal next to the station closed in 1991 when the traffic transferred to Liverpool. It has since been demolished and is now used as a car parking area for the Stena Line ferry service.

Passenger ships previously used to berth in the inner harbour next to Platform 1, this ceased when the port was re-developed. Stena Line built an administration building between platforms 1 and 2 in the early 1990s.

=== Stationmasters ===
- Charles Massingberd: 1848–1879
- William Guest: 1879–1906
- Joseph Jones: until 1912 (afterwards station master at London Euston)
- Andrew William Taylor: 1912–1913 (formerly station master at Flint, afterwards station master at Wigan)
- Hugh Morgan: 1913–1936
- H.W. Smith: 1936–1942

== Facilities ==
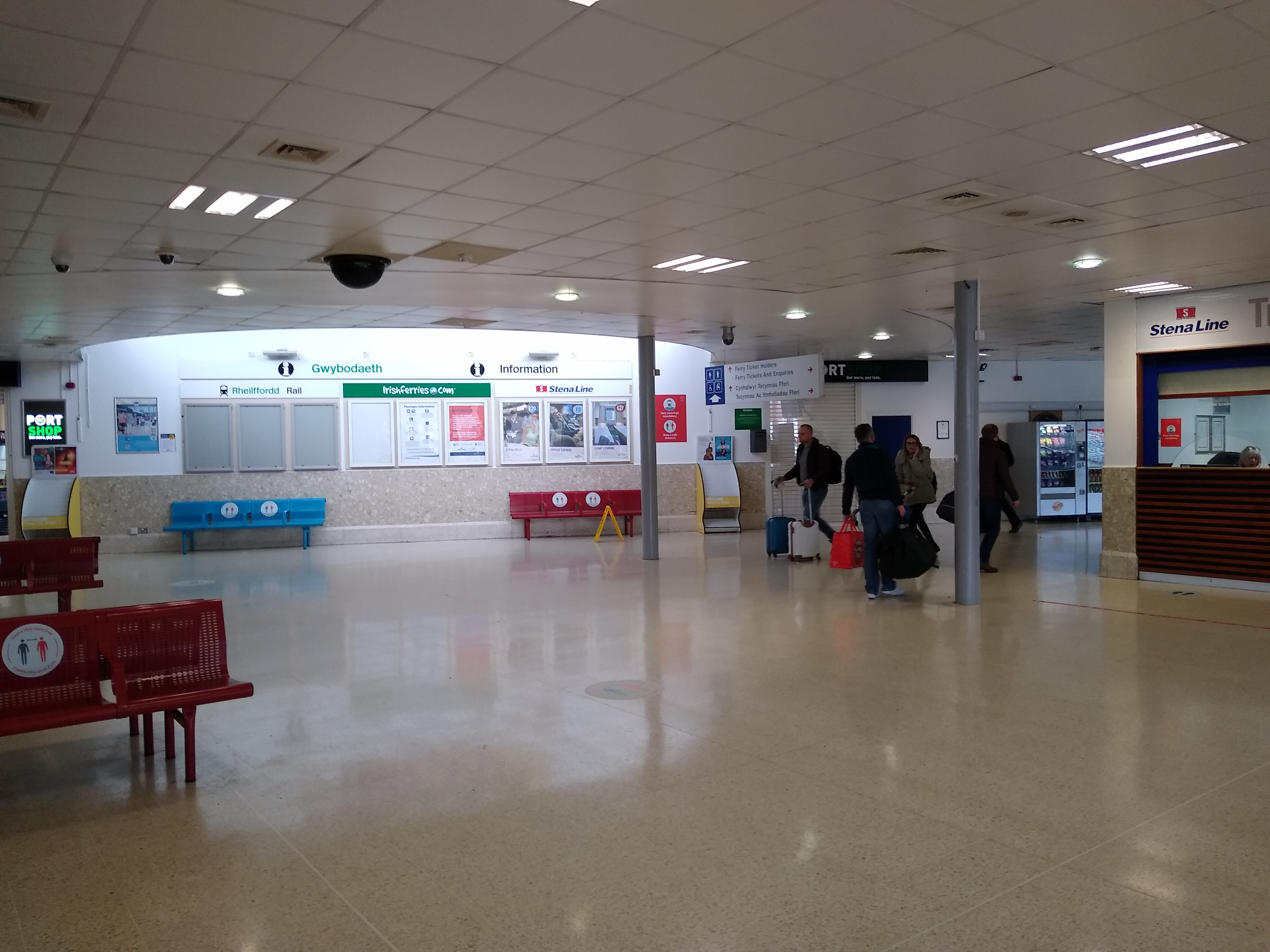
Interior of the joint railway station and ferry terminal

The station is fully staffed, with the ticket office in the main ferry terminal being staffed seven days a week. Self-service ticket machines are also provided. The terminal offers covered waiting accommodation, a payphone, a photo booth, a left luggage office, toilets, shops, and a cafe. Train running details are offered via digital information screens, timetable posters and automated announcements. Step-free access is available to all platforms.

== Services ==
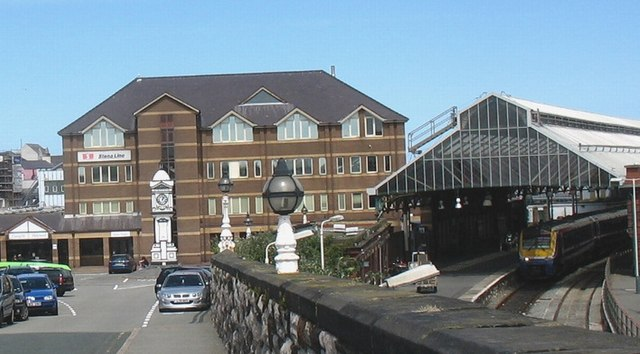
Stena House and Platform 2

On weekdays and Saturdays, Holyhead is served by an hourly Transport for Wales service to Manchester Airport, as well as a service to Cardiff Central via Shrewsbury that runs every two hours. A limited number of trains (mostly early morning and late evening) run to/from Crewe. On Sundays, the service is roughly hourly. Most Sunday services run to/from Crewe, with a limited number of trains to Birmingham, Cardiff and Manchester.

Avanti West Coast operate services to London Euston via the West Coast Main Line. On weekdays, there are 6 trains per day to London Euston, as well as 1 train per day which runs to Birmingham New Street via Crewe. On Saturdays, there are 6 trains per day to London Euston, and on Sundays there are 5 trains per day to London Euston.

Holyhead station adjoins the Port of Holyhead, where sailings to Dublin are operated by Irish Ferries and Stena Line. Up to September 2014 Stena Line operated a high-speed service to Dún Laoghaire, a suburb 12km south of Dublin City Centre.

Preceding station	National Rail	Following station
Valley	Transport for Wales Rail Holyhead – Crewe	Terminus
Bangor	Transport for Wales Rail Holyhead – Cardiff Central	Terminus
Bangor	Avanti West Coast London Euston – Holyhead	Terminus
	Ferry services	
Terminus	Irish Ferries; Ferry	Dublin Port
Terminus	Irish Ferries high-speed catamaran	Dublin Port
Terminus	Stena Line; Ferry	Dublin Port
