= Wellington railway station (Shropshire) =

Railway station in Shropshire, England

Coordinates: 52.7015°N 2.517°W

Wellington (Shropshire)
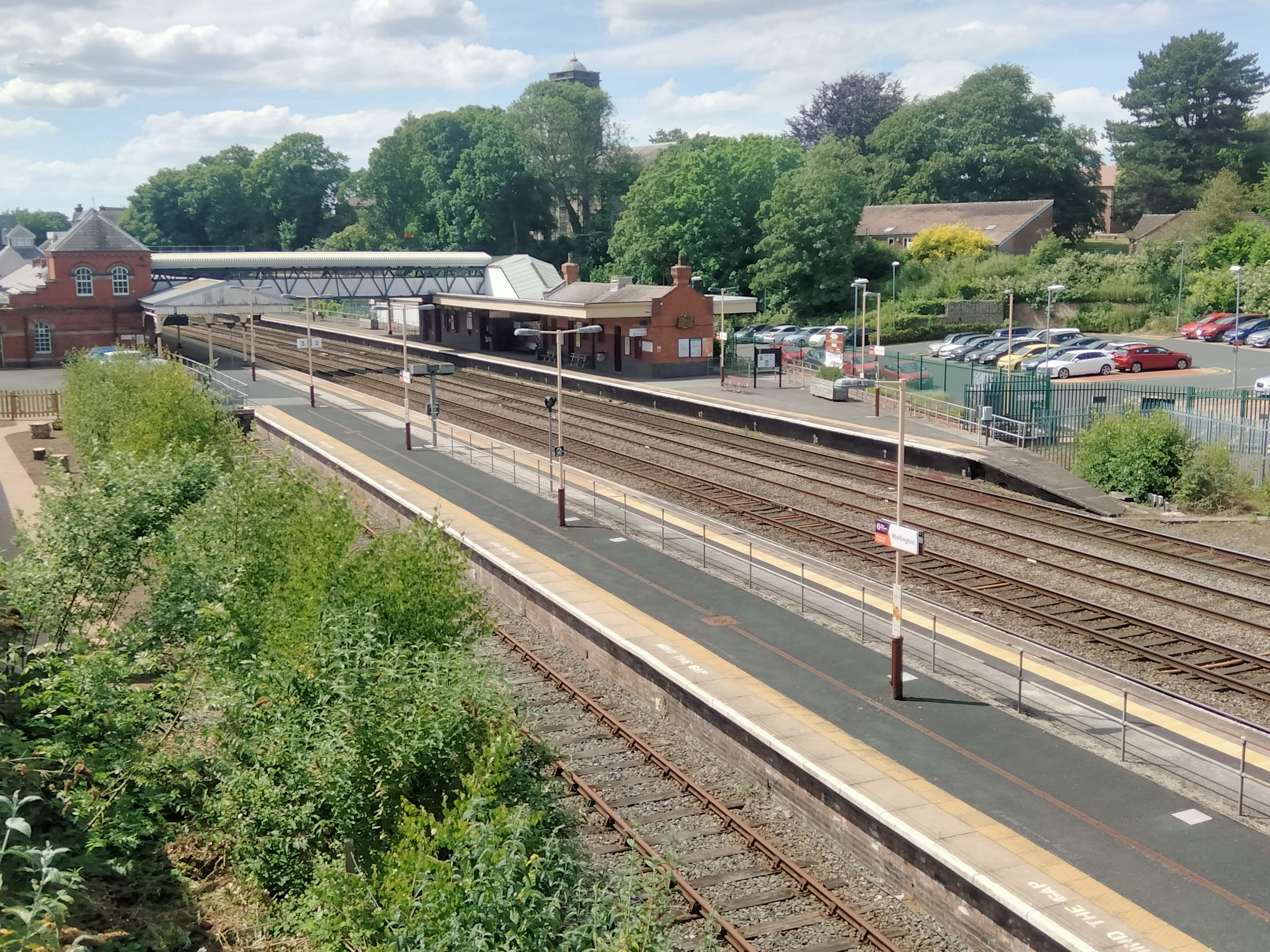
- View of the station facing west towards Shrewsbury (June 2022).

General information
- Location: Wellington, Telford and Wrekin, England
- Grid reference: SJ651116
- Manager: West Midlands Railway
- Platforms: 3

Other information
- Station code: WLN
- Classification: DfT category E

History
- Opened: 1 June 1849

Passengers
- 2021/22: ▲0.470 million
- 2022/23: ▲0.547 million
- 2023/24: ▲0.606 million
- 2024/25: ▲0.676 million
- 2025/26: ▲0.756 million
Location
Notes
- Passenger statistics from the Office of Rail and Road

Wellington railway station serves the town of Wellington, in Shropshire, England. It lies on the former Great Western Railway's route between London Paddington and Birkenhead Woodside, via Birmingham Snow Hill. The station is managed by West Midlands Railway, which also operates services along with Transport for Wales.

== History ==
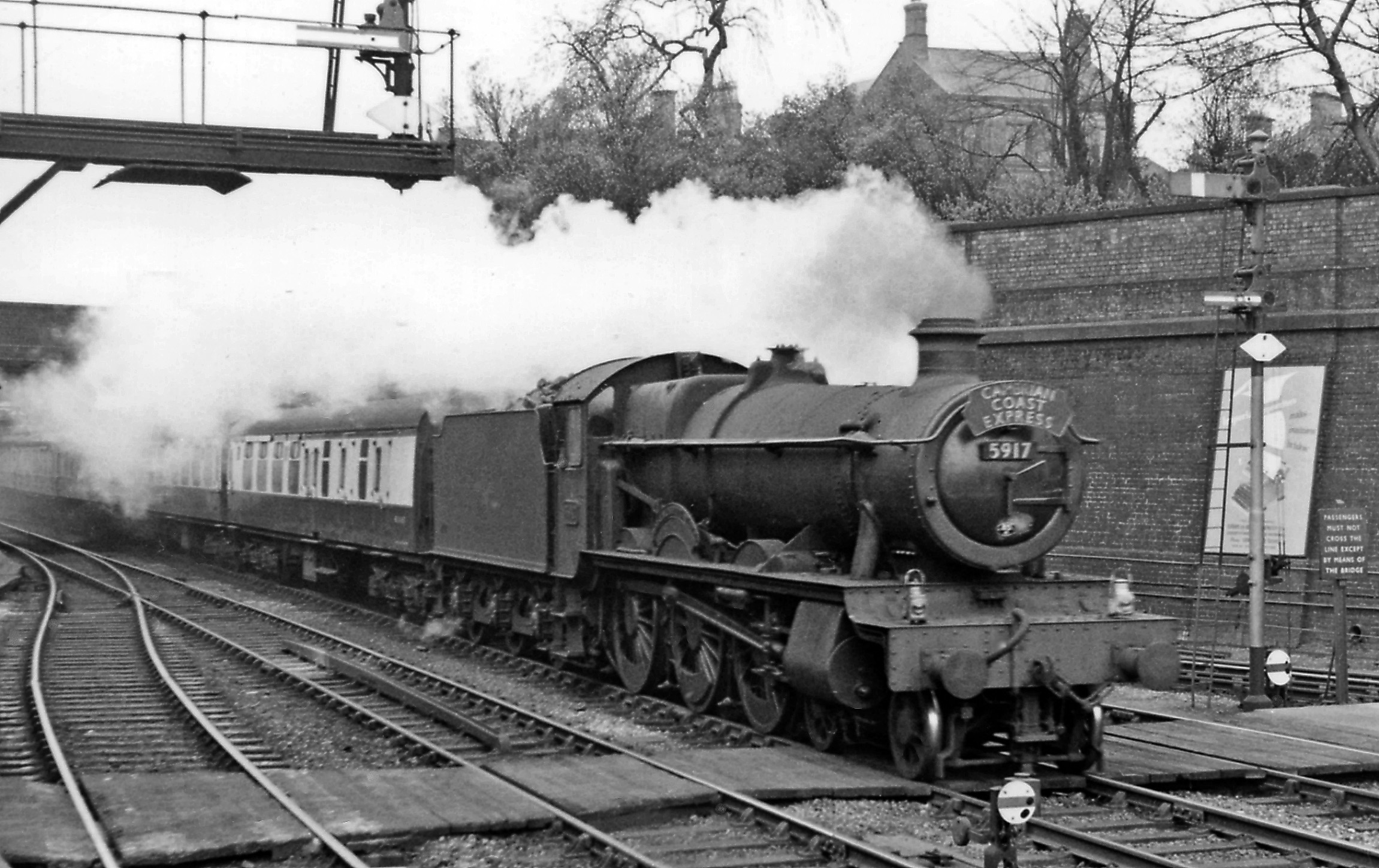
An up Cambrian Coast Express (1960)

The station was built at the junction of the Shrewsbury and Birmingham Railway (S&BR) with the Shropshire Union Railways and Canal Company's line from Stafford, via Newport. It was opened on 1 June 1849. The S&BR reached Wolverhampton Low Level later that year, but was frustrated in their attempts to reach Birmingham by the London and North Western Railway (LNWR); it was not until both they and the neighbouring Shrewsbury and Chester Railway became part the Great Western Railway (GWR) in November 1854 that trains could run to Birmingham Snow Hill. Wellington thereafter was run jointly by the LNWR and GWR until the 1923 Grouping.

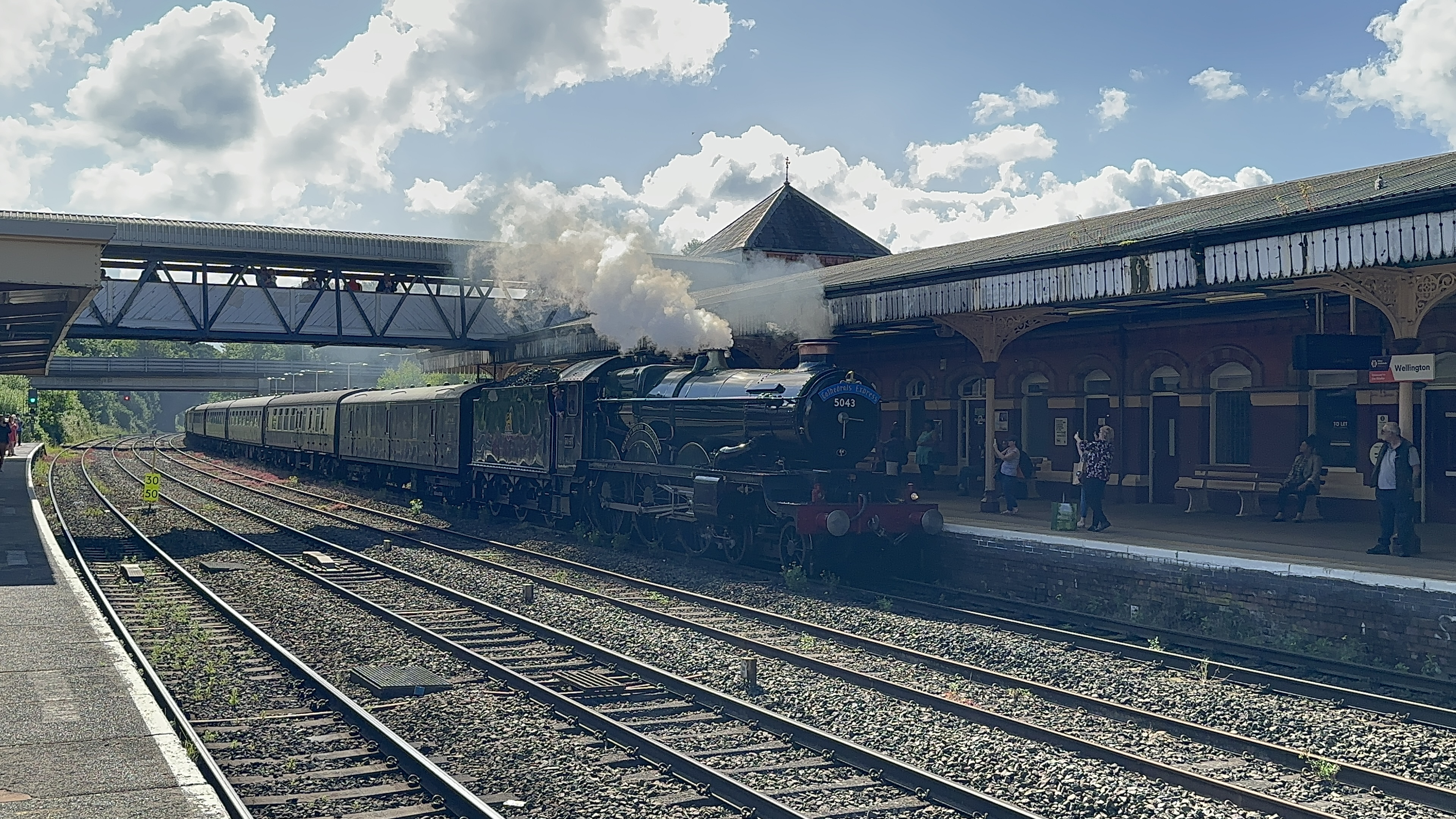
A steam excursion passes platform 2

It subsequently became a busy junction interchange station, serving the following lines:

- the Wellington and Drayton Railway northbound to Market Drayton, which opened in 1867)
- the Wellington and Severn Junction Railway southbound to Coalbrookdale, which opened in 1857
- the Shropshire Union Railways and Canal Company line north-eastbound to Stafford.

All three branches closed to passengers in the early 1960s; the Coalbrookdale line was the first to go in July 1962, that to Market Drayton and Nantwich followed in September 1963 and the Stafford line almost exactly a year later under the Beeching cuts in 1964. Services to Birmingham Snow Hill, via Wolverhampton Low Level, finally ended in March 1968; a year after the ending of through trains to London Paddington via this route, with trains henceforth diverted to the ex-LNWR Wolverhampton High Level and onwards to Birmingham New Street over the Stour Valley Line.

The station was formerly home to a small three-road engine shed and a coaling plant, which was originally designated WLN under the GWR from 1939-1949; then, under British Railways, it received the shed code 84H between 1950 and 1963. It became shed 2M for one year and was closed on 10 August 1964. A car park now occupies the site. Two of the locomotives which were allocated to the shed over its lifetime are preserved; those being LMS Ivatt 2MT no. 41241 and GWR 5700 no. 7754, at the Keighley & Worth Valley Railway and the Llangollen Railway respectively.

The town of Wellington was designated as part of the new town of Telford in the 1960s. As Telford did not have initially have its own railway station at first, the station was renamed Wellington – Telford West to indicate that it now served the new town. After Telford Central opened in 1986, Wellington eventually reverted to its original name, although this did not happen for a number of years.

At its peak, the station had six platforms in operation; As of June 2024, it has only three: two through platforms and one bay platform. Platform 3, the remaining bay platform, is now out of regular use following the withdrawal of the Wellington to Walsall local service. It is only semi-regularly visited by track maintenance or cleaning units, but sees very rare use by regular services in emergencies.

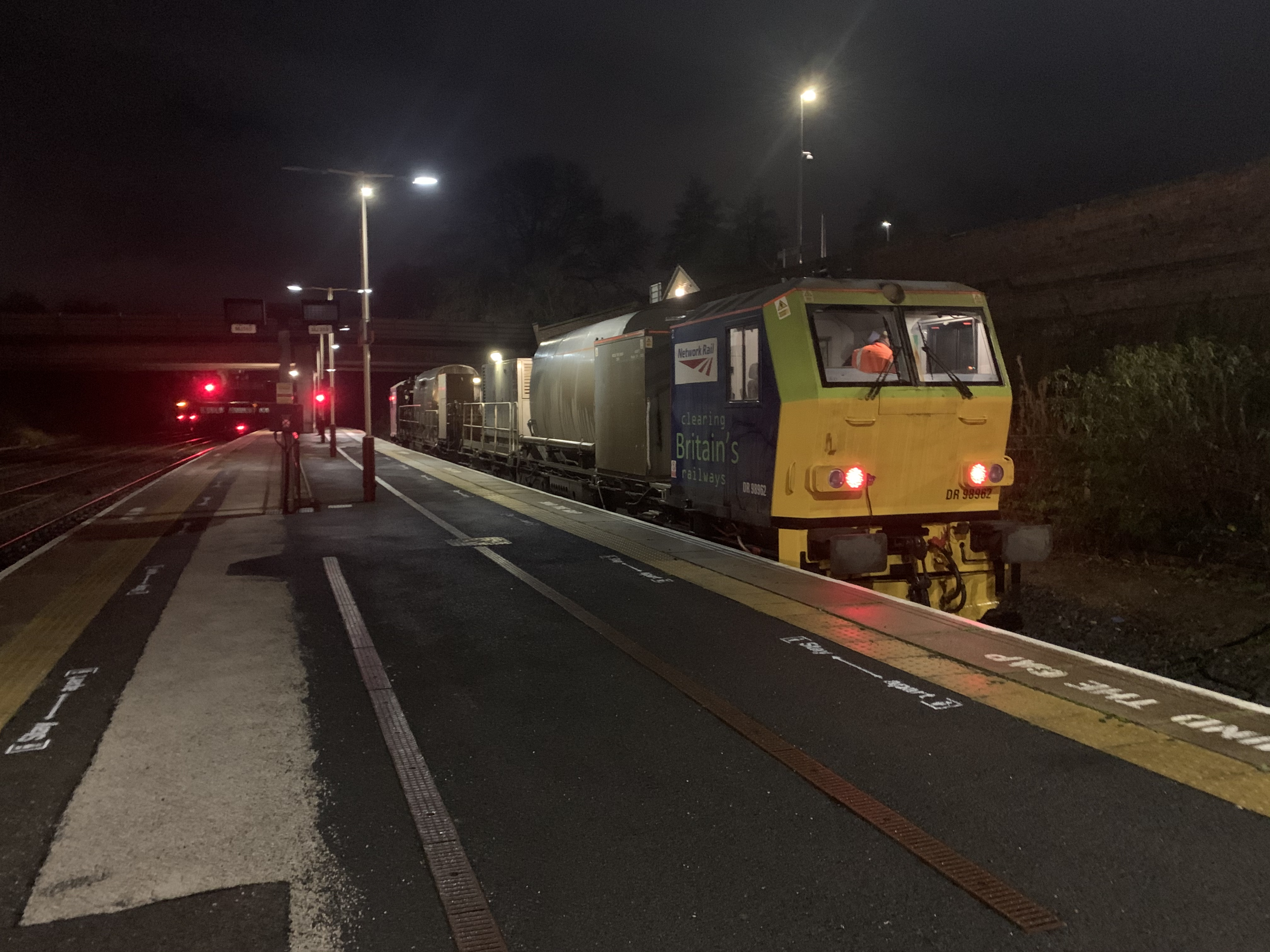
A track maintenance unit in platform 3

A disused bay platform can be seen directly adjacent to platform 3, which has been transformed into a small garden by volunteers. Traces of another former platform face can be seen from the car park behind platform 1; this is the outer side of an up island platform.

In late 2009-early 2010, the station was refurbished by London Midland.

=== Former services ===
Until March 1967, Wellington was served by the GWR, latterly British Rail Western Region, express services between London Paddington and Birkenhead Woodside; these were withdrawn upon the commissioning of the electrification of the West Coast Main Line.

Between 28 April 2008 and 28 January 2011, Wellington was a stop on Wrexham & Shropshire's service between Wrexham General and London Marylebone.

Avanti West Coast formerly ran one daily service to and from London Euston on the West Coast Main Line, via Birmingham and Coventry, using Class 221 Super Voyager units. These began at the December 2014 timetable change with Virgin Trains. This was withdrawn in June 2024.

Through trains to Walsall were withdrawn in December 2008. These recommenced in May 2019, following an introduction of two early morning services a week starting at Walsall and continuing to Shrewsbury. They were operated as extensions of the Shrewsbury to Birmingham Line. This replaced the former Liverpool Lime Street service. However, in December 2019, following problems with services and disruptions, the service was withdrawn once again.

== Facilities ==
The station has a ticket office on platform 2 that is staffed part-time. A ticket vending machine is provided on platform 1. There are canopied waiting areas on both sides, with toilets adjoining the booking hall on platform 2. Train running information is offered via automated announcements, CIS displays, timetable poster boards and a help point on both platforms. Step-free access is part available to all platforms.

In 2024, a small restaurant opened on platform 2.

== Services ==
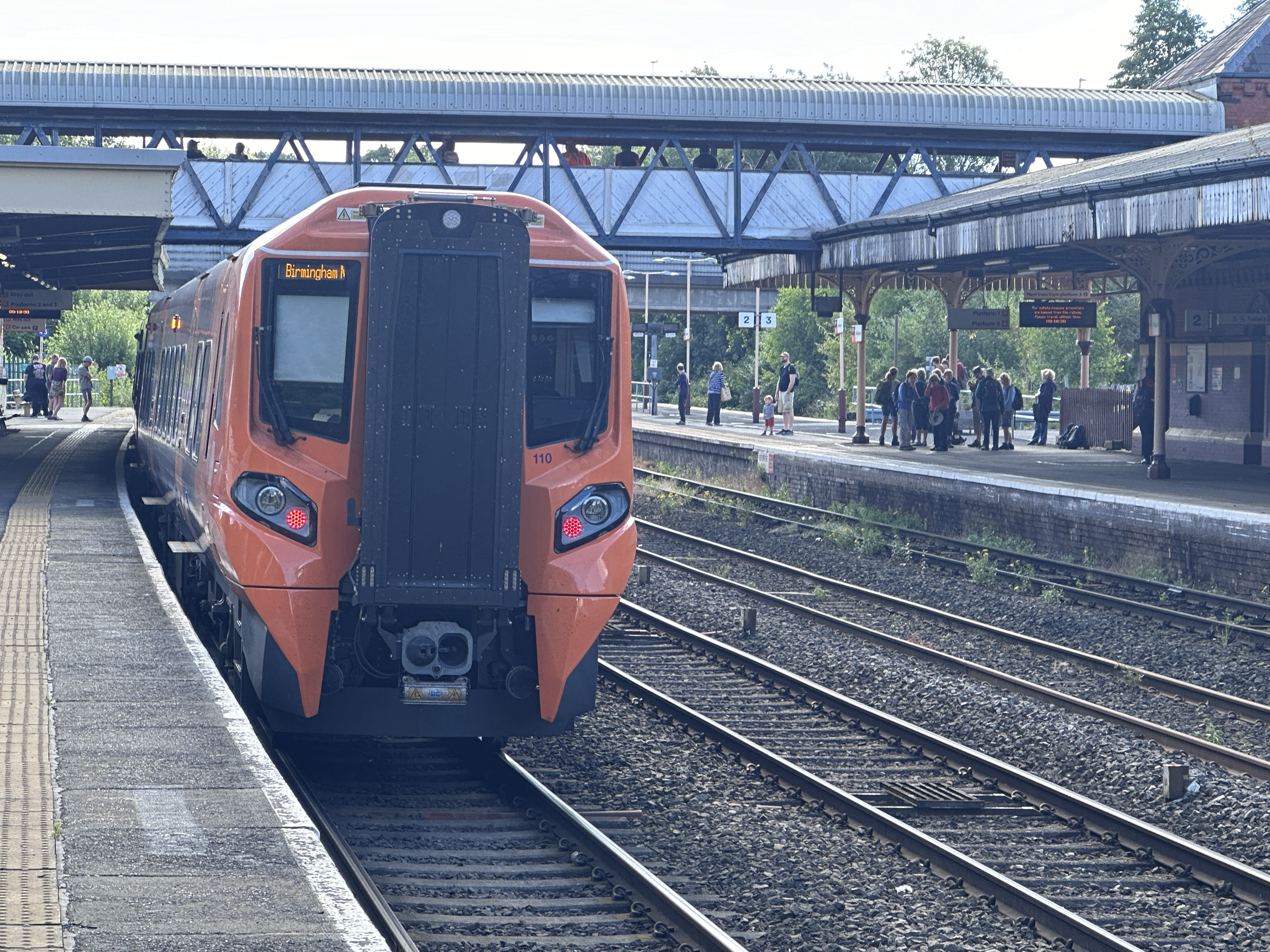
A West Midlands Railway service to Birmingham New Street calls at Wellington

Wellington is served by two train operating companies; they provide the following general off-peak services in trains per hour/day (tph/tpd):

West Midlands Railway:

- 2 tph to Birmingham New Street, via Telford Central and Wolverhampton; of which:
  - 1 tph calls at Telford Central, Shifnal, Wolverhampton, and Smethwick Galton Bridge
  - 1 tph calls at Oakengates, Telford Central, Shifnal, Cosford, Albrighton, Codsall, Bilbrook, Wolverhampton, Willenhall, Darlaston and Tame Bridge Parkway
- 2 tph to Shrewsbury.

Transport for Wales:

- 1 tph to Birmingham International, via Wolverhampton and Birmingham New Street.
- 1 tph to Shrewsbury; of which:
  - 5 tpd continues to Machynlleth, which splits to Aberystwyth and Pwllheli
  - 4 tpd to Holyhead, via Chester and Llandudno Junction
- 2 tpd to Llandudno
- 1 tpd to Manchester Piccadilly, via Warrington Bank Quay.

On Sundays, hourly services are provided by both operators.

Preceding station	National Rail	Following station
Telford Central	Transport for Wales; Cambrian Line	Shrewsbury
Telford Central or Oakengates	Transport for Wales; Birmingham – Chester	Shrewsbury
Telford Central or Oakengates	West Midlands Railway; Birmingham – Wolverhampton – Shrewsbury	Shrewsbury
	Disused railways	
Longdon Halt; Line and station closed	Great Western Railway; Wellington and Drayton Railway	Terminus
Terminus	Great Western Railway; Wellington and Severn Junction Railway	Ketley; Line and station closed
Admaston; Line open, station closed	London and North Western Railway; Stafford–Shrewsbury line	Hadley; Line and station closed
