= Telford Central railway station =

Railway station in Shropshire, England

Coordinates: 52.681°N 2.441°W

Telford Central
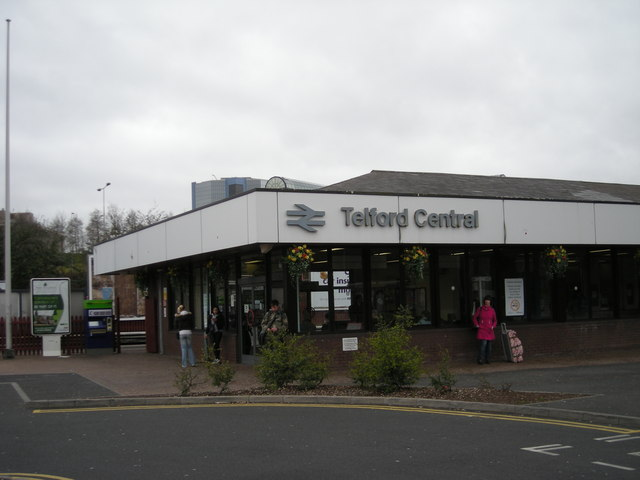

General information
- Location: Telford, Telford and Wrekin; England
- Grid reference: SJ702093
- Managed by: West Midlands Railway
- Platforms: 2
- Train operators: West Midlands Railway; Transport for Wales

Other information
- Station code: TFC
- Classification: DfT category C2

History
- Opened: 12 May 1986

Passengers
- 2020/21: ▼0.205 million
- Interchange: 1,304
- 2021/22: ▲0.698 million
- Interchange: ▲3,859
- 2022/23: ▲0.883 million
- Interchange: ▼2,986
- 2023/24: ▲1.016 million
- Interchange: ▲4,348
- 2024/25: ▲1.178 million
- Interchange: ▼3,835
Location
Notes
- Passenger statistics from the Office of Rail and Road

Telford Central railway station serves the town of Telford, Shropshire, England. It is located on the Wolverhampton to Shrewsbury Line and is operated by West Midlands Trains. It is situated close to the Telford Centre, the main commercial district of the town.

== History ==
Telford was designated as a new town in the 1960s and, until the 1980s, was served by two stations which predated its foundation: Oakengates and Wellington railway stations. Wellington was at one stage renamed "Wellington - Telford West" to indicate that it was located in the new town. (Until 1985, the line through the designated area also had a 'halt station' called New Hadley Halt, between Oakengates and Wellington.)

The situation changed in May 1986, when Telford Central opened. The new station was equipped with full-length platforms to accommodate inter-city trains. The development included a large car park, which took advantage of its location next to the M54 motorway to provide a park and ride facility. The £700,000 (Note: about £2 million today.) cost was jointly funded by British Rail, the Telford Development Corporation and Shropshire County Council.

The station and car park were built on the former Hollinswood sidings that served the Lilleshall Company and local industry.

== Facilities ==
The station is staffed all week, with the ticket office open Monday - Saturday 06:00 - 19:00 and Sunday 10:00 - 17:00. A ticket machine is provided in the booking hall for use outside these times and for the collection of pre-paid tickets. Until Summer 2020, a coffee kiosk and photo booth were located in the main building on Platform 1 (for Wolverhampton and Birmingham), although these were removed and replaced with a set of vending machines. Nevertheless, a coffee kiosk was re-added after the pandemic. Toilet facilities are also provided on Platform 1, whilst Platform 2 (Shrewsbury and beyond) has bench seating, a ticket machine and a waiting shelter only. CIS displays, automatic announcements and timetable posters provide train running information on both platforms. Step-free access is available to both platforms (via lifts and ramps accessed via the footbridge or public roads).

== Services ==
Telford Central is served by two train operating companies, West Midlands Trains and Transport for Wales Rail with the following standard service:

=== Transport for Wales (Transport for Wales Rail) ===
Transport for Wales operates services at the station using Class 158 and Class 197 Diesel multiple units.

==== Weekdays and Saturdays ====
- 1 train per 2 hours (1 tp2h) northbound to Dovey Junction via Shrewsbury, whereby:
  - Half of the train continues to Pwllheli (Mon-Sat);
  - Half of the train continues to Aberystwyth (Mon-Sat).
- 1 tp2h northbound to Holyhead via Shrewsbury and Chester (Mon-Sat).
- 1 train per day northbound to Manchester Piccadilly via Chester and Warrington Bank Quay. (Nighttime service)
- 1 tph southbound to Birmingham International via Wolverhampton and Birmingham New Street (Mon-Sat).

==== Sundays ====
- 1 trains per 2 hours (1 tp2h) northbound to Dovey Junction via Shrewsbury, whereby:
  - Half of the train continues to Pwllheli;
  - Half of the train continues to Aberystwyth.
- 1 tp2h northbound to Chester via Shrewsbury.
- 1 tph southbound to Birmingham International via Wolverhampton and Birmingham New Street.

=== West Midlands Railway (West Midlands Trains) ===
West Midlands Railway operates services at the station using Class 196 Diesel multiple units. Previously, services were operated using Class 170 Diesel multiple units.

==== Weekdays and Saturdays ====
- 2 tph northbound to Shrewsbury, of which:
  - 1 tph calls at Oakengates and Wellington (Mon-Sat);
  - 1 tph calls at Wellington only (Mon-Sat).
- 2 tph southbound to Birmingham New Street via Wolverhampton, of which:
  - 1 tph calls at Shifnal, Cosford, Albrighton, Codsall, Bilbrook, Wolverhampton, Willenhall, Darlaston and Tame Bridge Parkway (Mon-Sat).
  - 1 tph off-peak calls at Shifnal, Wolverhampton and Smethwick Galton Bridge (Mon-Sat);
  - 1 tph peak calls at Shifnal, Codsall, Wolverhampton and Smethwick Galton Bridge (Mon-Fri).

==== Sundays ====
- 1 tph northbound to Shrewsbury, via Oakengates and Wellington;
- 1 tph southbound to Birmingham New Street via Shifnal, Cosford, Albrighton, Codsall, Bilbrook, Wolverhampton and Smethwick Galton Bridge.

Sunday services consist of an hourly fast service (Chester or Aberystwyth to Birmingham International), operated by Transport for Wales, and an hourly stopping service (Shrewsbury to Birmingham), operated by West Midlands Trains.

=== Former services to London ===
Although the station was built to accommodate inter-city trains to and from London Euston, with the road leading to the station aptly named Euston Way, British Rail services ceased in the early 1990s and Virgin Trains West Coast withdrew a short-lived trial daily service between Shrewsbury and London in 2000. A new company, Wrexham & Shropshire, reintroduced express services (to London Marylebone) on 28 April 2008; these were withdrawn on 28 January 2011. In December 2014, Virgin Trains re-introduced two daily services to and from London Euston.

Prior to the June 2024 timetable change, Avanti West Coast operated a daily direct service to and from London Euston via Birmingham New Street and Coventry, with Class 221s.

A new operator owned by Alstom, the Wrexham, Shropshire & Midlands Railway, has proposed to restart services to and from London Euston. However, the proposal was rejected by the Office of Rail and Road in July 2025.

Preceding station	National Rail	Following station
Shifnal	West Midlands Railway; Birmingham – Wolverhampton – Shrewsbury	Oakengates or Wellington
Shifnal	Transport for Wales; Birmingham – Wolverhampton – Chester	Oakengates or Wellington
Wolverhampton	Transport for Wales; Cambrian Line	Wellington
Wolverhampton	Transport for Wales; Birmingham – Chester – Holyhead	Wellington
	Proposed services	
Wolverhampton	Wrexham, Shropshire & Midlands Railway	Shrewsbury
	Previous services	
Cosford	Wrexham & Shropshire London – Wrexham	Wellington (Shropshire)
Wolverhampton	Avanti West Coast London – Shrewsbury	Wellington (Shropshire)
