= New Hadley Halt railway station =

Railway station in Ketley, England

New Hadley Halt

General information
- Location: Ketley, Shropshire; England
- Coordinates: 52.7000°N 2.4734°W
- Grid reference: SJ680115
- Platforms: 2

Other information
- Status: Disused

History
- Original company: Great Western Railway
- Post-grouping: Great Western Railway

Key dates
- 3 November 1934: Opened
- 13 May 1985: Closed
Location

New Hadley Halt was a minor station between Oakengates and Wellington on the former Great Western Railway's London Paddington to Birkenhead via Birmingham Snow Hill line. It was opened by the Great Western Railway in 1934. It was closed on 13 May 1985 due to uneconomic required repairs and it was demolished in 1986.

Preceding station	Disused railways	Following station
Wellington; Line and station open	Great Western Railway; Wolverhampton–Shrewsbury line	Oakengates; Line and station open
