= Codsall railway station =

Railway station in Staffordshire, England

Coordinates: 52.627°N 2.202°W

Codsall
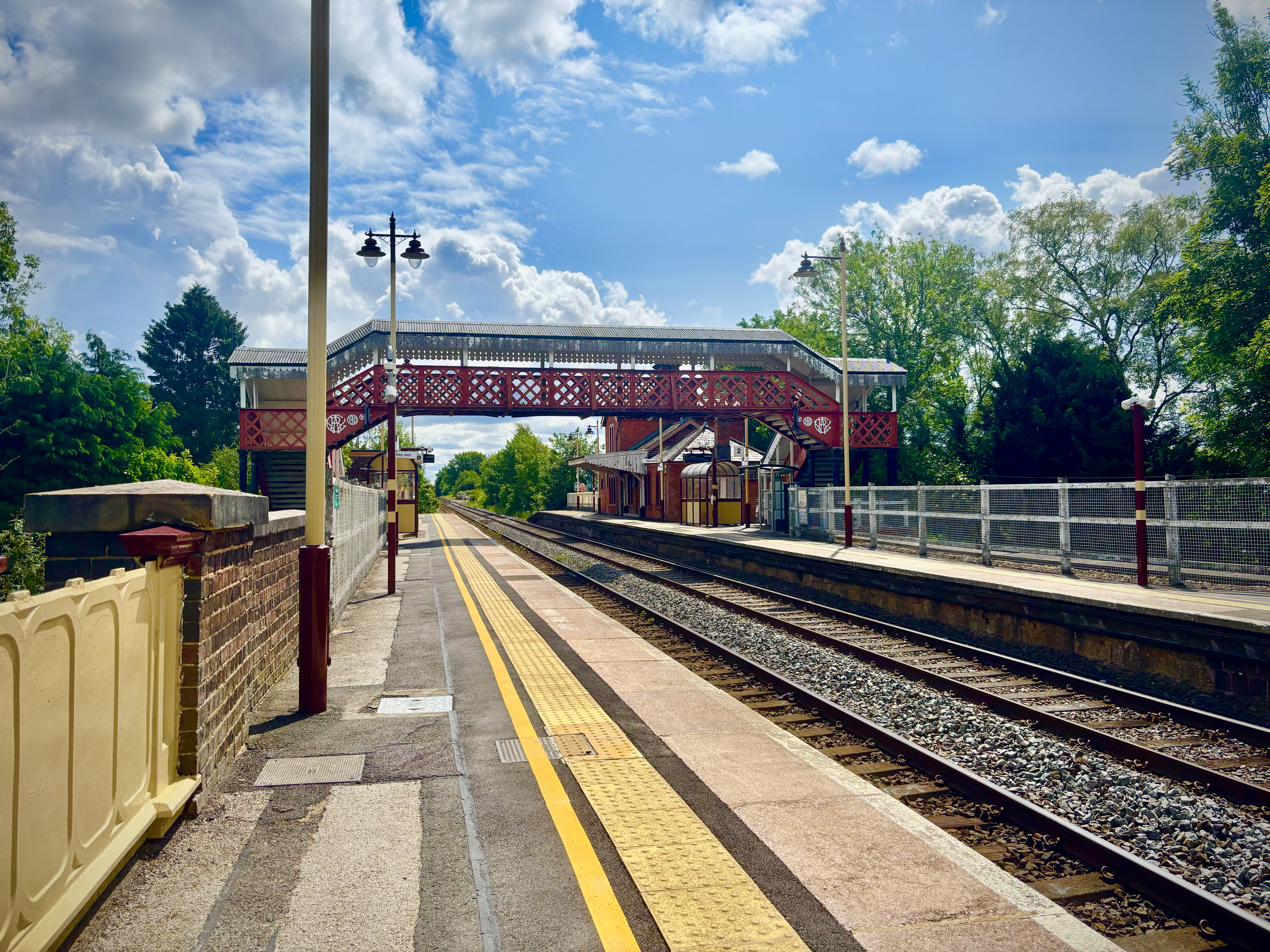
- The station in 2025

General information
- Location: Codsall, South Staffordshire; England
- Grid reference: SJ864033
- Manager: West Midlands Railway
- Platforms: 2

Other information
- Station code: CSL
- Classification: DfT category F2

History
- Opened: 1849

Passengers
- 2021/22: ▲87,982
- 2022/23: ▲106,340
- 2023/24: ▲122,224
- 2024/25: ▲135,854
- 2025/26: ▲166,394
Location
Notes
- Passenger statistics from the Office of Rail and Road

Codsall railway station serves the village of Codsall in Staffordshire, England.

== History ==
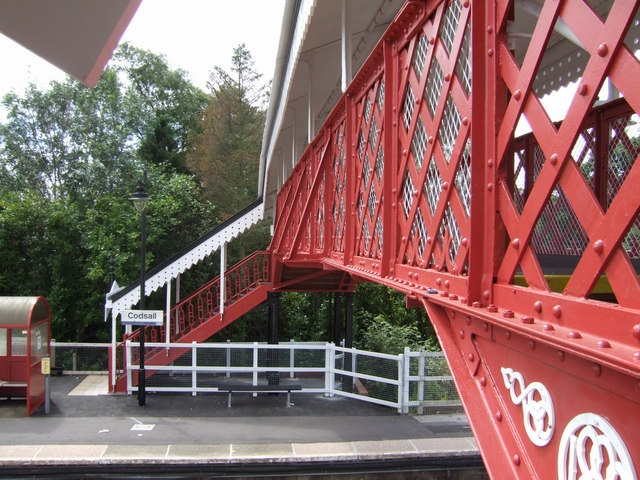
Restored listed footbridge

The original listed GWR footbridge, between the two platforms and which dated from 1883, was accidentally destroyed by contractors using a road-rail crane in June 2005. Five of the original cast iron columns have been damaged beyond repair. The replacement replica columns were cast at Barr and Grosvenor's foundry in Wolverhampton during 2007. Approximately 70% of the original wrought iron span was found to be salvageable for reuse in the replacement which has been rebuilt a little higher than the original to comply with current regulations.

The GWR signal box stood slightly to the east of Codsall station.

It was taken out of use and control of the area passed to Madeley Junction as a result of the 2006 resignalling scheme. The lever and locking frame from the signal box were recovered by Network Rail for re-use in the south-west of England. The remaining re-usable parts of the signal box have been relocated to the Dean Forest Railway.

The station house on the westbound platform has undergone a renovation in recent years and is now home to a CAMRA award-winning public house known as The Station. This opened in 1999 as a Holdens Brewery house.

== Facilities ==
The station is unstaffed, and has the basic facilities that can be expected at a station of its type. There is a ticket machine on platform 1 and covered waiting areas, help and assistance points and passenger information displays on both platforms.

== Services ==
Codsall is typically served by one train per hour in each direction between Birmingham New Street and Shrewsbury via Wolverhampton and Telford Central, which calls at all local stations en route. Additional trains also call at peak periods, with the service becoming 2tph. Most services are operated by West Midlands Trains, with one westbound Transport for Wales service westbound towards Telford and Shrewsbury after midnight Monday-Sunday and an additional nighttime service to Wolverhampton on Sundays. West Midlands Railway operate their services using Class 196 DMUs.

Preceding station	National Rail	Following station
Bilbrook	West Midlands Railway; Wolverhampton–Shrewsbury line	Albrighton
Bilbrook	Transport for Wales; Wolverhampton–Shrewsbury line Limited service	Albrighton
