= Telford railway station =

Telford railway station may refer to one or other of two articles:

- Telford Central railway station, a station in England
- Telford, a stopping place on the former Central Australia Railway
