= Shifnal railway station =

Railway station in Shropshire, England

Coordinates: 52.666°N 2.372°W

Shifnal
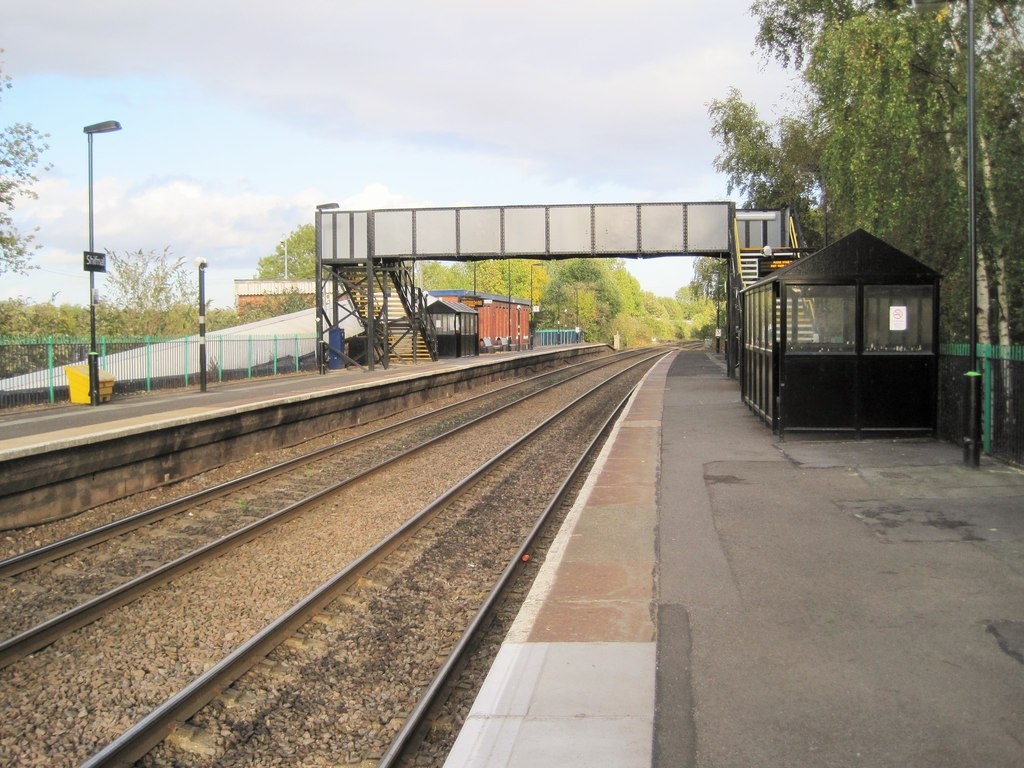

General information
- Location: Shifnal, Shropshire; England
- Grid reference: SJ749076
- Manager: West Midlands Railway
- Platforms: 2

Other information
- Station code: SFN
- Classification: DfT category F2

History
- Opened: 1849

Passengers
- 2021/22: ▲114,584
- 2022/23: ▲142,132
- 2023/24: ▲173,102
- 2024/25: ▲236,680
- 2025/26: ▲298,602
Location
Notes
- Passenger statistics from the Office of Rail and Road

Shifnal railway station is a railway station which serves the town of Shifnal in Shropshire, England. The station is managed by West Midlands Trains, who provide the majority of services that call here (it is also served by Transport for Wales).

The station (opened in 1849) is located on a viaduct/causeway high above the village itself. It is on the Wolverhampton–Shrewsbury line. When Shifnal was controlled by semaphore signalling it boasted a three-storey signal box. The building by the entrance at street level is not in railway use and there are no permanent buildings left at platform level.

== Facilities ==
The station is unstaffed, but does have a ticket machine. Waiting shelters are provided on both platforms and service running information is given via CIS displays, timetable poster boards and customer help points on each side. Level access is possible from the car park on the Birmingham-bound platform (1) only - the main entrance on Market Place is below platform level and is only accessible via a staircase, whilst the footbridge between the two platforms also has steps.

== Services ==
As of June 2024 Shifnal is served by West Midlands Railway using Class 196 Diesel multiple units.

The off-peak service pattern is as follows:

Mondays to Saturdays:

- 2 trains per hour (tph) northbound to Shrewsbury via Telford Central and Wellington, departing from Platform 2. 1 tph calls at Oakengates.
- 2 trains per hour (tph) southbound to Birmingham New Street via Wolverhampton, departing from Platform 1.
  - Of which:
    - 1 tph runs fast, off-peak calling additionally at Smethwick Galton Bridge only.
    - 1 tph calls at all stations between Shifnal and Wolverhampton, then at Willenhall, Darlaston & Tame Bridge Parkway only.

Sundays:

- 1 tph northbound to Shrewsbury.
- 1 tph southbound to Birmingham New Street.

Services on Sundays call at all stations between Birmingham New Street and Shrewsbury.

Additionally, one Transport for Wales service calls per day after midnight, westbound only to Telford and Shrewsbury. An additional nighttime Transport for Wales service heading eastbound to Wolverhampton on Sundays only.

Preceding station	National Rail	Following station
Wolverhampton	West Midlands Railway Birmingham – Wolverhampton – Shrewsbury	Telford Central
Cosford	West Midlands Railway Birmingham – Wolverhampton – Shrewsbury	Telford Central
Cosford	Transport for Wales Birmingham–Wolverhampton–Chester; Limited service	Telford Central
