= Wrexham & Shropshire =

British train operating company, 2008-2011

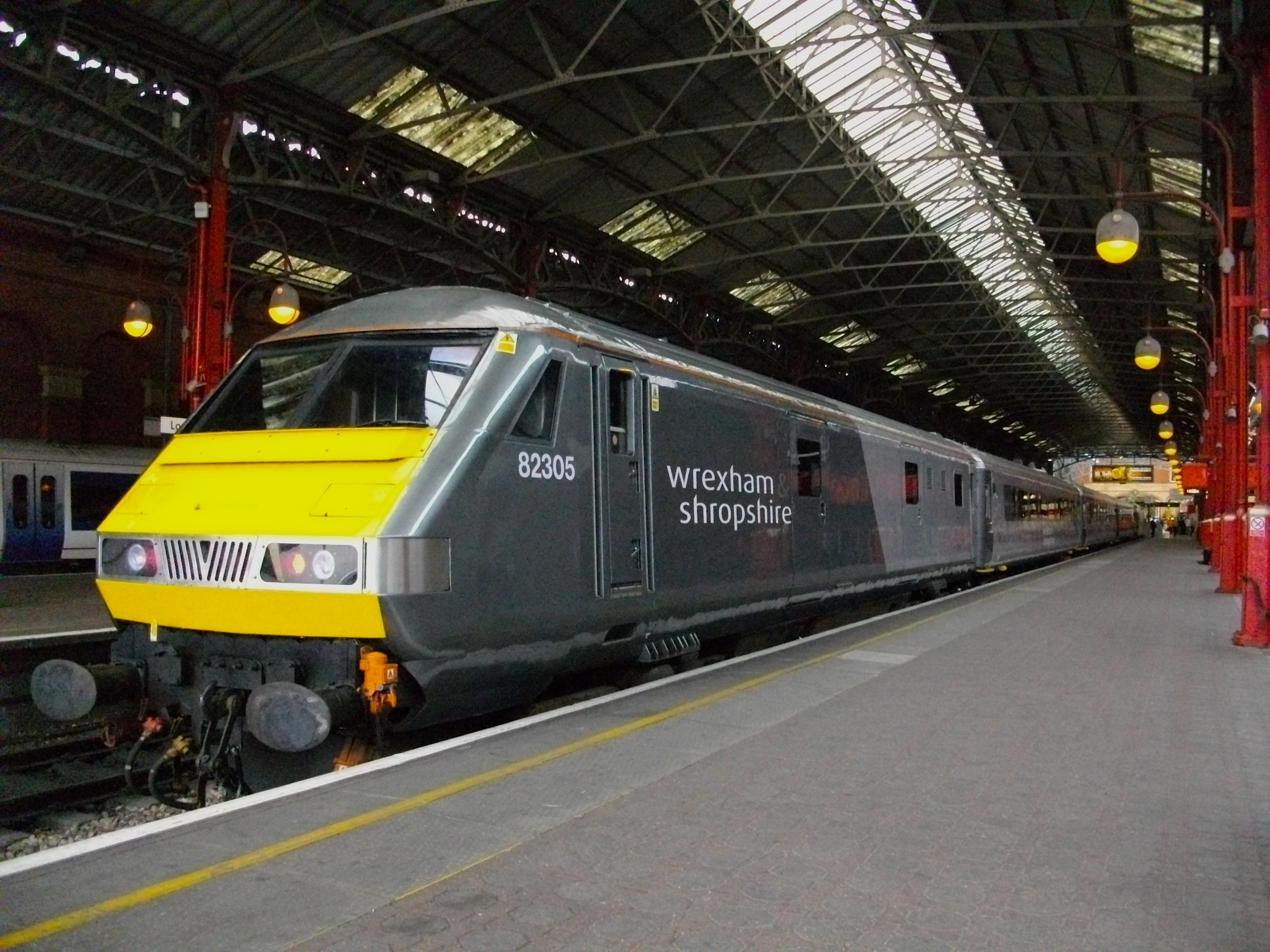
- Driving Van Trailer coupled to Mark 3 carriages at Marylebone in September 2009

Overview
- Franchises: Open access operator Not subject to franchising 28 April 2008 – 28 January 2011
- Main route: Wrexham General - Shrewsbury - Wellington - Tame Bridge - London Marylebone
- Other route: None
- Fleet: 5 Class 67 locomotives; 16 Mark 3 carriages; 5 Driving Van Trailers
- Stations called at: 12 (also called at Wembley Stadium during events)
- Parent company: Arriva
- Reporting mark: WS

Other
- Website: www.wrexhamandshropshire.co.uk

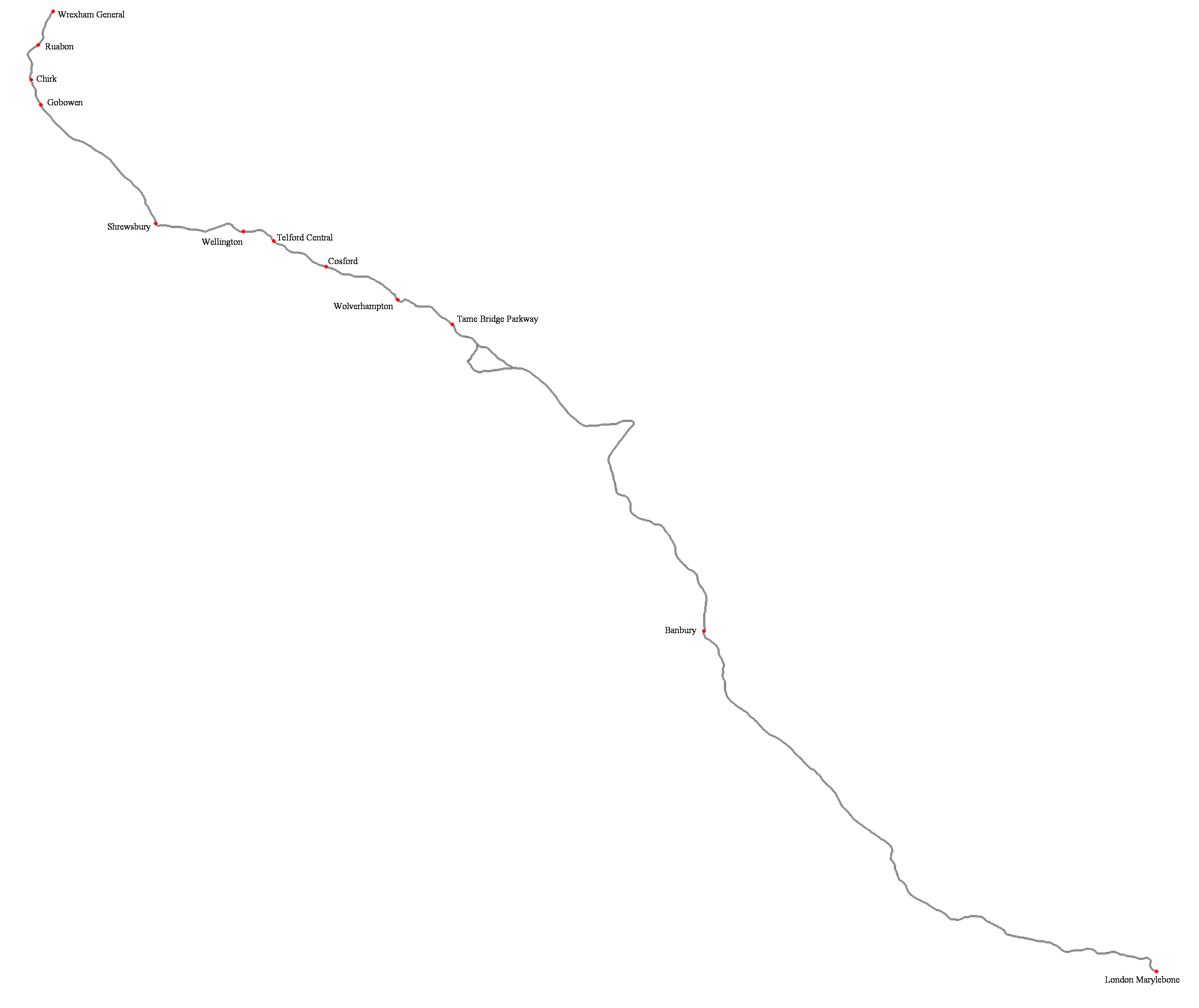
Geographical representation of the Wrexham & Shropshire route

Wrexham & Shropshire (legally Wrexham, Shropshire & Marylebone Railway Company Limited) was a British open-access operator that provided passenger rail services between Wrexham General and London Marylebone from April 2008 until January 2011.

The company was founded in early 2006 to restore the discontinued service between London and stations in Shropshire and the Welsh Marches. In October 2006, an evaluation service was run from London Marylebone to Wrexham General to test the route's viability. In March 2007, Wrexham & Shropshire applied for track access rights to the Office of Rail and Road (ORR) to operate services. This application was granted from December 2007, and passenger services started on 28 April 2008. Wrexham & Shropshire had planned to operate a small fleet of Class 158 or Class 170 diesel multiple units. However, it was instead decided to use locomotive-hauled rakes of Mark 3 carriages, paired with Driving Van Trailers and Class 67 locomotives.

It began as a joint venture between John Laing and Renaissance Trains. The former sold its rail operations division and its shareholding in Wrexham & Shropshire to the German state railway company Deutsche Bahn in January 2008. In September 2009, DB Regio announced that it had arranged to take complete ownership of the company. DB Regio partially aligned the company with another of its subsidiaries, Chiltern Railways, and at one point attempted to merge the two companies. Financial support for the venture was forthcoming from the Welsh Assembly. New facilities were opened at Wrexham General, while a refurbishment programme of the Mark 3 carriages resulted in higher quality rolling stock being introduced from September 2009.

In 2009, it became clear that the service was attracting fewer than anticipated passengers, an outcome that Wrexham & Shropshire attributed to a wider economic downturn. The number of trains operated was decreased from a peak of five per day to three per weekday by December 2010. A rival service by Virgin Trains between London and Wrexham via Chester had also begun in October 2008; other operators also had ambitions to start direct train services between London and Shrewsbury. During January 2011, it was announced that there was no prospect of the service ever becoming profitable; on 28 January 2011, Wrexham & Shropshire ceased all operations.

== History ==
=== Formation ===
Wrexham & Shropshire was established during early 2006 with the aim of operating rail passenger services between Wrexham and London Marylebone. The company was a joint venture between John Laing and Renaissance Trains. Unlike the majority of train operating companies active at that time, this new operator had not been awarded a franchise to run the service, but instead pursued the venture as an open access operator. There was no incumbent competition, as direct railway services between the region and London had been withdrawn by InterCity in 1992.

The franchised operator Virgin Trains had launched its own service between Shrewsbury and London Euston in May 1998, but the company had decided to withdraw this service during 1999.

In October 2006, an evaluation service ran from London Marylebone to Wrexham General via the proposed route using the EWS Company Train. This evaluation train, formed from a rake of Mark 3 carriages with a British Rail Class 67 locomotive on either end. This was a satisfactory arrangement, and it was announced that a broadly similar arrangement would be used for the regular service during December 2006. However, Wrexham & Shropshire's original plans had envisaged using either Class 158 or Class 170 diesel multiple units, but a lack of available rolling stock had compelled the company to adopt the locomotive-hauled arrangement instead. Reportedly, planners had initially identified five potential routes for the service.

During October 2006, the Welsh Assembly announced that Wrexham & Shropshire did not qualify for employment grants which the company had intended to use to improve the facilities at Wrexham General railway station in order to turn it into its operational centre. This outcome led to speculation that, if sufficient funding could not be found, the company might have to relocate its base to Shrewsbury, and that such a move would adversely impact the number of services that would be operated to/from Wrexham as well as other stations. However, in November 2006, the Welsh Assembly announced that the Wrexham & Shropshire was eligible for the grant and, as a result, a site survey at Wrexham General was undertaken. Upon its completion, the depot was to be open to all train operating companies.

=== Approval and launch ===
In March 2007, Wrexham & Shropshire lodged an application with the Office of Rail Regulation for track access rights to operate services. In September 2007, the company was granted access rights from December 2007 for a seven-year period. The timing of this decision meant that Wrexham & Shropshire's original plan to launch passenger services in 2007 had to be postponed into the first part of the following year.

On 28 April 2008, Wrexham & Shropshire commenced scheduled passenger operations. The occasion was hailed by Deputy First Minister Ieuan Wyn Jones as "a key role in building a more effective rail network for Wales". The launch of Wrexham and Shropshire saw the restoration of regular direct trains between Wrexham and London for the first time in 41 years.

The relatively lengthy journey time, which was partly due to the use of unfavourable train paths, was attributed as a detracting element of the service. Favourable features included the rolling stock itself, which was frequently observed to be of a high standard and relatively luxurious. The firm rapidly established an excellent reputation for customer service, being scored on multiple surveys in the high 90s, including a 99 per cent customer satisfaction rating in 2010, the highest of any British train operator.

=== Ownership changes and proposed merger ===
In January 2008, John Laing's rail operations division, which included its shareholding in Wrexham & Shropshire, were sold to the German state railway company Deutsche Bahn. After this transaction, the shareholders in Wrexham & Shropshire were DB Regio (50%), Renaissance Trains (36%) and John Laing (14%). In September 2009, DB Regio announced that it would be taking complete ownership of Wrexham & Shropshire, resulting in its partial alignment with fellow DB-owned UK train operating company Chiltern Railways.

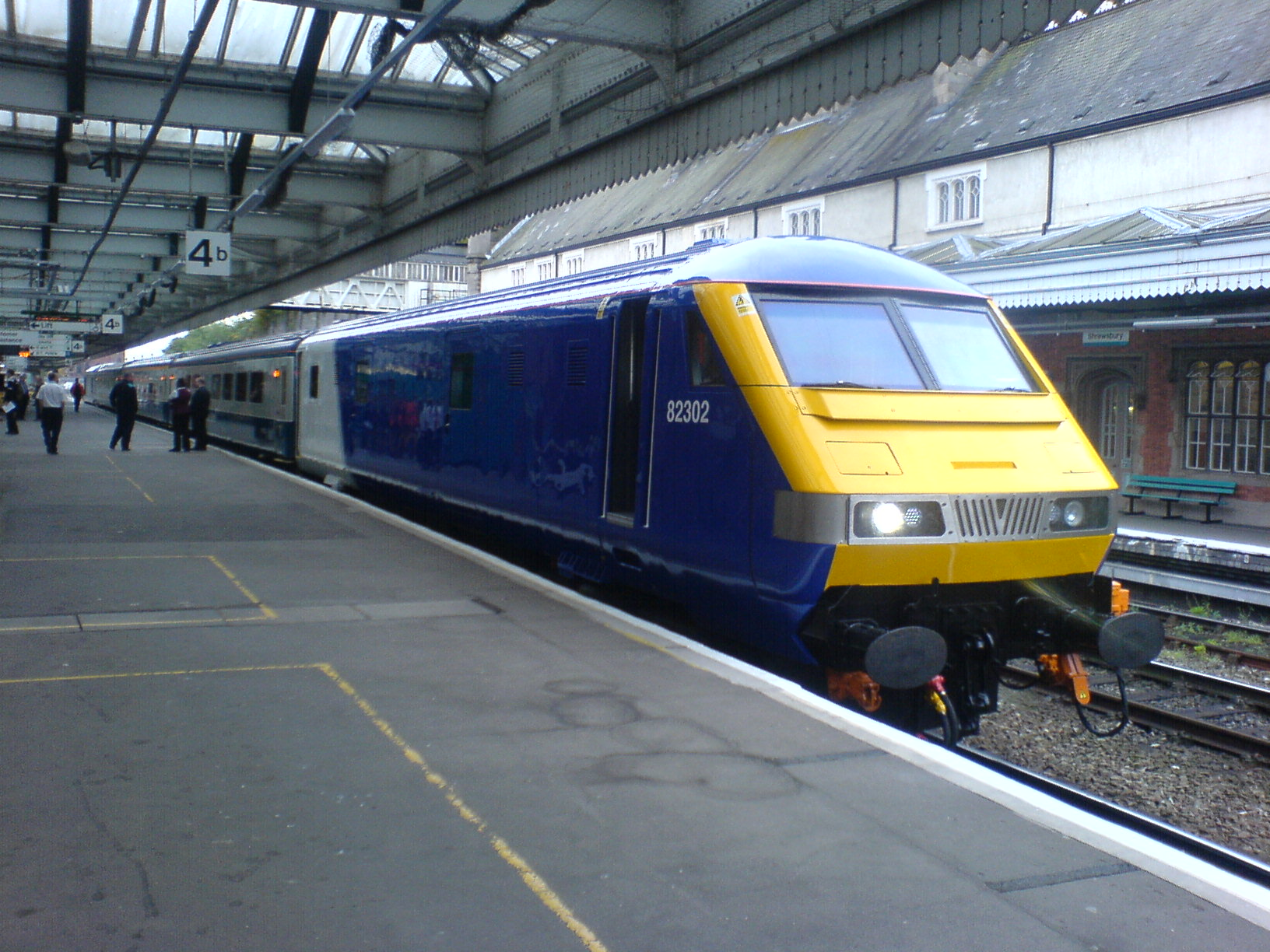
Driving Van Trailer in Chiltern Railways livery at Shrewsbury

In September 2009, Wrexham & Shropshire announced that from the beginning of 2010, it hoped to transfer operation of the Wrexham & Shropshire branded services to fellow DB Regio subsidiary Chiltern Railways. In light of the problems encountered with Wrexham & Shropshire abstracting revenue from Chiltern Railways, the Department for Transport did not sanction the merger, effectively preventing it from going ahead.

=== Demise ===
On 28 January 2011, Wrexham & Shropshire ceased all operations after a review had concluded there was no prospect of the business ever being profitable; it had incurred losses of £2.9 million in 2010 alone. While the decision to terminate its services had been heavily influenced by financial factors, the company was not insolvent and was still able to fulfil all of its financial commitments. The low passenger numbers and lack of profitability were attributed to the Great Recession. Customers who had purchased advanced tickets beyond this date were able to use them on alternative routes using the trains of other companies. The last train that was run by the company was the 18:30 from London Marylebone to Wrexham General.

Following the end of operations, Wrexham & Shropshire's assets were dispersed and typically saw use elsewhere. The majority of the company's former rolling stock was transferred to Chiltern Railways and promptly re-deployed on its core Birmingham-London route. The Class 67 locomotives were returned to general use with their owner DB Schenker. Where possible, Wrexham & Shropshire's staff were found new positions with other train operators.

== Services ==
=== Route ===
From Wrexham General services ran via Ruabon, Chirk, Gobowen, Shrewsbury, Wellington, Telford Central, Cosford and Wolverhampton to Tame Bridge Parkway. From here services would proceed to Banbury and London Marylebone either via Stechford, Birmingham International and Coventry, or via Birmingham New Street and Solihull.

Because of a Moderation of Competition clause inserted into Virgin Trains' Track Access Contract with Network Rail by the government, Wrexham & Shropshire were not able to service a number of West Coast Main Line stations. Wrexham & Shropshire's Track Access Contract did not allow it to call at Birmingham New Street or Coventry, although the contract did allow it to call at Wolverhampton and Birmingham International to pick up only on northbound services and set down only on southbound services, although Wrexham & Shropshire elected not to serve the latter.

Likewise to protect Chiltern Railways from revenue abstraction (even though both entities were owned by the same parent company, DB Regio), northbound services could only pick up and southbound services set down at Banbury. From December 2009, the Banbury restrictions were lifted and services also called at Leamington Spa. The Leamington Spa stops were removed in May 2010, after the Department for Transport found that revenue had been abstracted from Chiltern Railways.

=== Diversionary routes ===
During weekend engineering works, Wrexham & Shropshire services were frequently diverted. When the Wrexham to Shrewsbury line was closed services operated from Wrexham General to Shrewsbury via Chester and Crewe. When the Shrewsbury to Wolverhampton line was closed services reversed at Shrewsbury before reversing again at Crewe and proceeding via Stafford to Wolverhampton. When the line south of Birmingham was closed, services operated via the West Coast Main Line, Willesden Junction, Acton Junction and Ealing Broadway to South Ruislip before reversing to reach Marylebone. When the South Ruislip to Marylebone line was closed services would be diverted to London Paddington.

=== Timetable ===
Wrexham & Shropshire's initial timetable was for five trains per weekday between Wrexham and London with a journey time of approximately four hours and 15 minutes. This timetable had been formulated several years prior to the service's launch, largely by planners at John Liang.

In March 2009, the weekday service was reduced to four trains per day with one cut back to only operate from London to Shrewsbury, Wrexham & Shropshire citing the wider economic downturn for the cancelled services. From July until September 2010, a fourth Saturday service was operated. In December 2010, the weekday service was reduced further to three per day, with insufficient customer demand being cited as the reason.

=== Rival services ===
In February 2008, Virgin Trains announced that its intention to operate a direct service between Wrexham General and Euston on a trial basis from December 2008, with a morning southbound and evening northbound service. Virgin's service operated from Wrexham General via Chester and Crewe to London Euston along the West Coast Main Line using Class 221 Super Voyagers, with a journey time of approximately two and a half hours, compared with Wrexham & Shropshire's average of four hours. As this was an extension of a Chester - Euston service, it did not serve stations in Shropshire or the West Midlands.

Arriva Trains Wales lodged an application with the Office of Rail Regulation to operate two daily trains from Aberystwyth to London Marylebone. The application was rejected in February 2010 because the Office of Rail Regulation was concerned about the financial viability of the service. DB Regio had stated that if the application was successful that it would cease funding Wrexham & Shropshire and operations would cease.

== Rolling stock ==
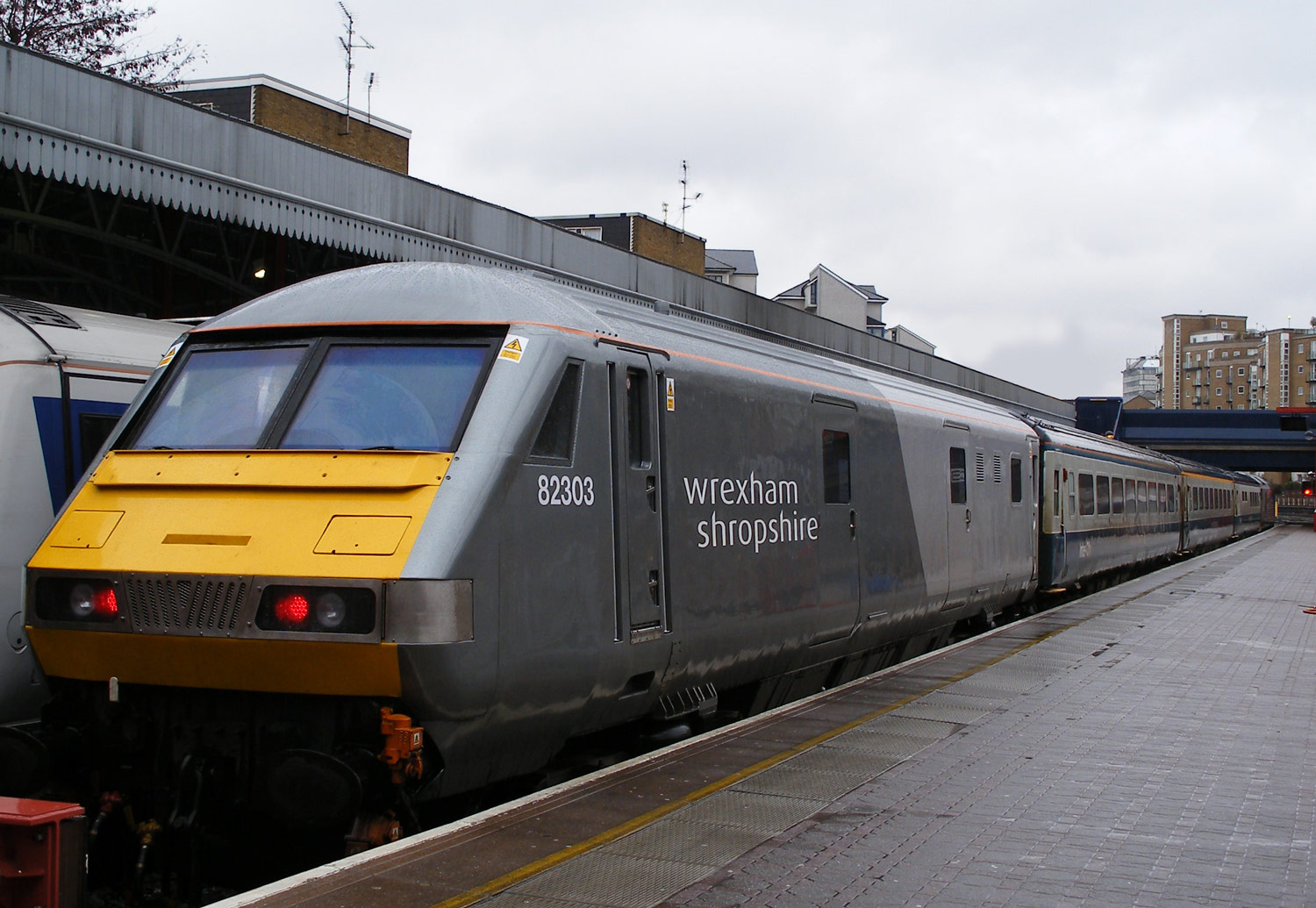
Driving Van Trailer at London Marylebone

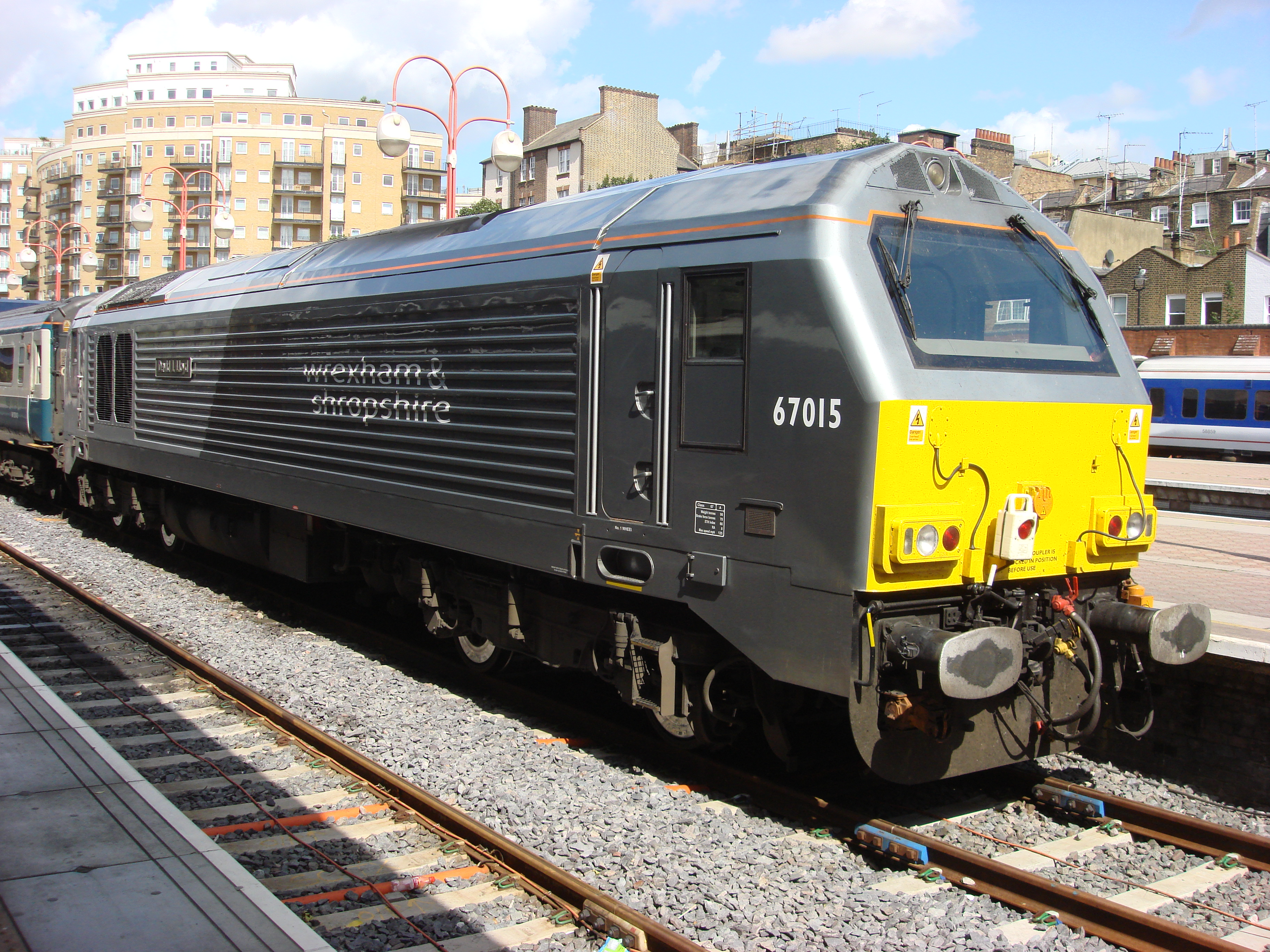
67015 at London Marylebone

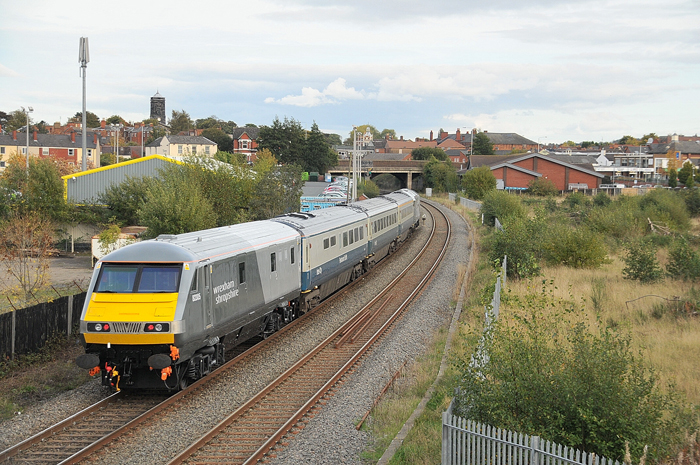
Driving Van Trailer trailing a set of Cargo-D Mark 3s

Services were operated by a DB Schenker Class 67, Mark 3 carriages and a Driving Van Trailer. To operate the service, DB Regio purchased a fleet of ex Virgin West Coast Mark 3s and Driving Van Trailers and put them through a refurbishment programme at Marcroft Engineering, Stoke-on-Trent. A dedicated fleet of four Class 67s (012-015) were repainted in Wrexham & Shropshire livery in preparation for the service's launch in April 2008, followed by a fifth (010) in April 2009.

When services commenced, none of the carriages were ready, thus Mark 3s were hired from Cargo-D and operated in top and tail with a Class 67 at each end. The Driving Van Trailers entered service in October 2008, but it would be September 2009 before the first Mark 3s were ready. Originally the four sets consisted of three Mark 3s, this was later increased to four from May 2009 although these were not refurbished internally.

Following Wrexham & Shropshire's reduction in service levels from December 2010, a single Mark 3 set was leased to Chiltern Railways to operate a Birmingham Moor Street to London Marylebone peak-hour service.

=== Fleet ===
Class	Image	Type	Quantity	Top speed		Route operated	Built
Class	Image	Type	Quantity	mph	km/h	Route operated	Built
67		Diesel–electric locomotive	5	125	200	Wrexham–London Marylebone	1999–2000
Mark 3		Passenger carriage	16	125	200	Wrexham–London Marylebone	1975–1988
Mark 3		Driving Van Trailer	5	125	200	Wrexham–London Marylebone	1988–1990

=== Depots ===
The Mark 3 sets were based at Chiltern Railways' Aylesbury depot. They were also stabled at Wembley depot and in the bay platforms at the south end of Wrexham General that were reactivated.

== See also ==
- Railways of Shropshire
