= Albrighton railway station =

Railway station in Shropshire, England

Coordinates: 52°38′18″N 2°16′08″W

Albrighton
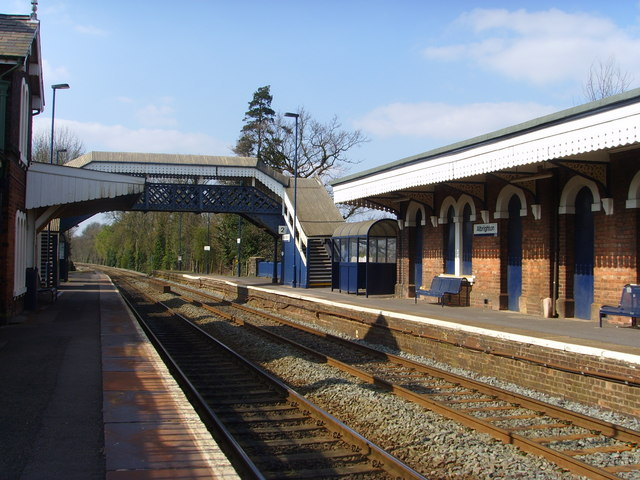

General information
- Location: Albrighton, Shropshire; England
- Grid reference: SJ818045
- Manager: West Midlands Railway
- Platforms: 2

Other information
- Station code: ALB
- Classification: DfT category F2

Key dates
- 12 November 1849: Opened

Passengers
- 2021/22: ▲56,078
- 2022/23: ▲69,556
- 2023/24: ▲91,340
- 2024/25: ▲92,196
- 2025/26: ▲0.102 million
Location
Notes
- Passenger statistics from the Office of Rail and Road

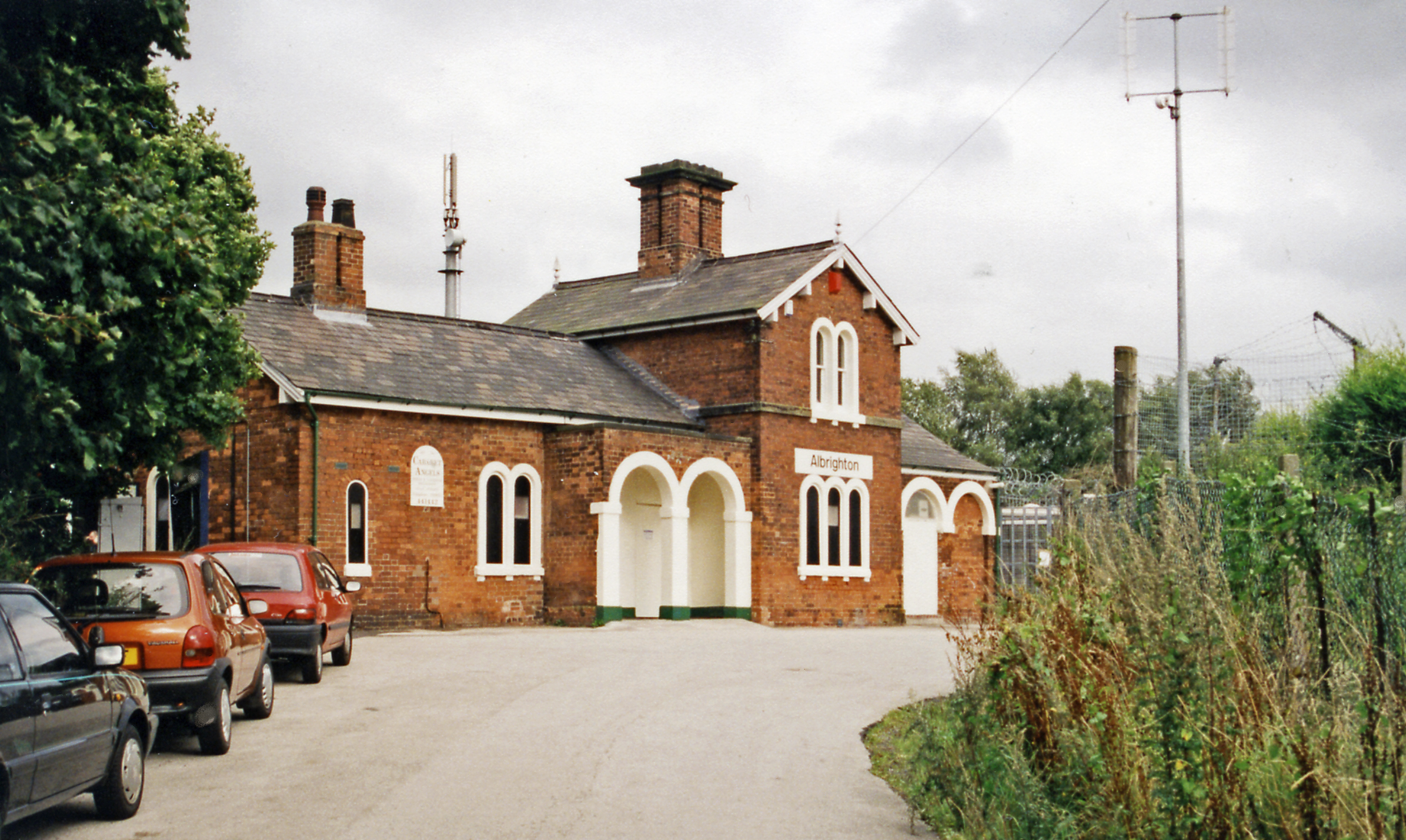
The station approach seen in 1999

Albrighton railway station is a railway station which serves the village of Albrighton in Shropshire, England. The former up goods yard is now occupied by a small estate of low rise offices.

== History ==
Opened by the Shrewsbury and Birmingham Railway, it became part of the Great Western Railway, staying there during the Grouping of 1923. The line then passed on to the London Midland Region of British Railways on nationalisation in 1948.

When Sectorisation was introduced, the station was served by Regional Railways.

== Refurbishment ==
The station underwent a refurbishment, at a cost of £1.5 million, which commenced in spring 2012. The project is supported by the local civic society and will see the listed buildings and structures restored.

== Services ==
Albrighton is typically served Monday to Sunday by one train per hour in each direction between Birmingham New Street and Shrewsbury via Wolverhampton, with some extra trains at peak times on weekdays.These services are operated by West Midlands Trains under the 'West Midlands Railway' brand using British Rail Class 196 DMUs. One Transport for Wales service calls per day after midnight, westbound only to Telford and Shrewsbury. Sunday services are hourly calling at all stations, with an additional nighttime Transport for Wales service heading eastbound to Wolverhampton on Sundays only.

== See also ==
- Listed buildings in Albrighton, Bridgnorth

Preceding station	National Rail	Following station
Codsall	West Midlands Railway; Birmingham - Wolverhampton - Shrewsbury	Cosford
Codsall	Transport for Wales; Birmingham - Chester	Cosford
