= Oakengates railway station =

Railway station in Shropshire, England

Coordinates: 52.693°N 2.450°W

Oakengates
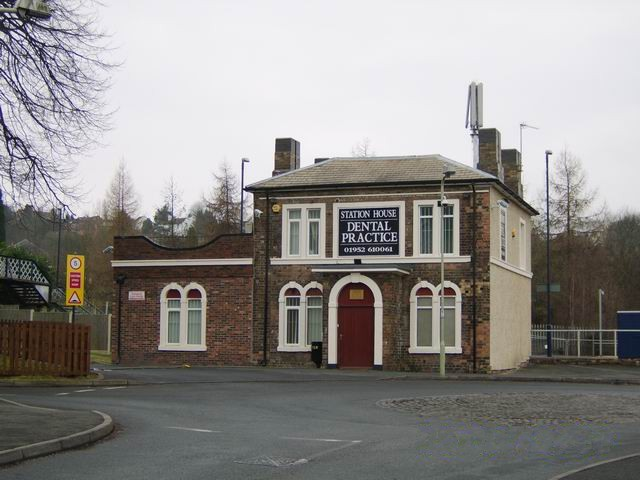

General information
- Location: Oakengates, Telford and Wrekin; England
- Grid reference: SJ696107
- Manager: West Midlands Railway
- Platforms: 2

Other information
- Station code: OKN
- Classification: DfT category F2

History
- Opened: 1849

Passengers
- 2021/22: ▲47,932
- 2022/23: ▲54,020
- 2023/24: ▲71,524
- 2024/25: ▲71,964
- 2025/26: ▲79,584
Location
Notes
- Passenger statistics from the Office of Rail and Road

Oakengates railway station serves the town of Oakengates, Telford and Wrekin, Shropshire, England. It has two platforms.

Rail services are primarily provided by West Midlands Trains with Transport for Wales providing a service on late evenings through the week, and a limited service on Sundays.

Between Oakengates and Telford Central is the Oakengates Tunnel.

== Oakengates Tunnel ==
This tunnel was a major problem in the construction of the railway, delaying the project by three years between 1846 and 1849. Details of the difficulties, including unseasonable weather, are contained in a report dated 21 August 1848 from Robert Stephenson, Consulting Engineer, and William Baker, the Shropshire Union Railway Engineer. Originally built for broad-gauge railways, this tunnel is the only one on the Shrewsbury to Wolverhampton line and the longest of the three railway tunnels presently in use in Shropshire, stretching for 471 yards.

The tunnel passed under the summit level of the Shropshire Canal and was the scene of a disaster in 1855, when a breach from the canal into the tunnel occurred. The entire summit level emptied into the tunnel, causing flooding in the town, although there were no reports of any personal injury.

An accident occurred at the station on 11 September 1877, when a Great Western train, the 7:40 am from Shrewsbury, arrived at Oakengates station on time at 8:09 am. The boiler of its locomotive, no. 153, exploded due to failure of the midfeather. The explosion mortally wounded the driver, Anthony Robson Potter, and injured the fireman, Alfred Cliff.

== Services ==
Oakengates is typically served Monday to Sunday by one train per hour in each direction between Birmingham New Street and Shrewsbury via Wolverhampton, with some extra trains at peak times on weekdays. These services are operated by West Midlands Trains under the 'West Midlands Railway' brand using Class 196 DMUs. Transport for Wales serves the station with one train per day to Shrewsbury (single direction) after midnight. This train is the last northbound departure of the day.

Preceding station	National Rail	Following station
Telford Central	West Midlands Railway; Birmingham – Wolverhampton – Shrewsbury	Wellington
Telford Central	Transport for Wales; Birmingham – Chester; Limited service	Wellington
