= Cosford railway station =

Railway station in Shropshire, England

Coordinates: 52.6448°N 2.3°W

Cosford
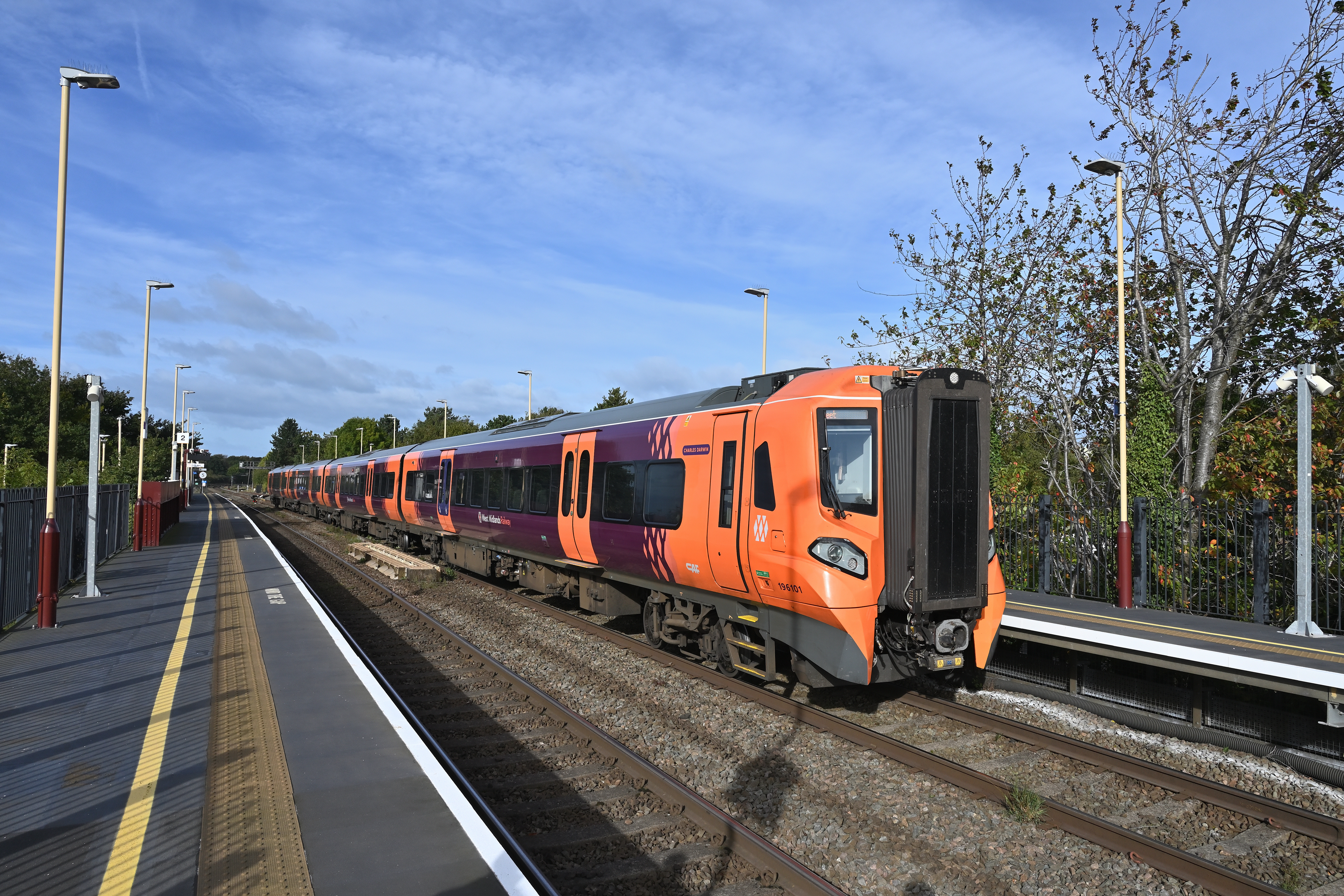
- 196101 at Cosford working a Shrewsbury to Birmingham New Street service

General information
- Location: Cosford, Shropshire; England
- Grid reference: SJ797052
- Manager: West Midlands Railway
- Platforms: 2

Other information
- Station code: COS
- Classification: DfT category F2

History
- Opened: 1937

Passengers
- 2021/22: ▲49,816
- 2022/23: ▲62,352
- 2023/24: ▲71,394
- 2024/25: ▲82,350
- 2025/26: ▲92,834
Location
Notes
- Passenger statistics from the Office of Rail and Road

Cosford railway station is a railway station which serves the village of Cosford in Shropshire, England. It also serves RAF Cosford which is also home to a branch of the Royal Air Force Museum. The station is served by West Midlands Trains, who manage the station, and Transport for Wales. Between 2008 and 2011 it was also served by the direct London operator, Wrexham & Shropshire.

== History ==
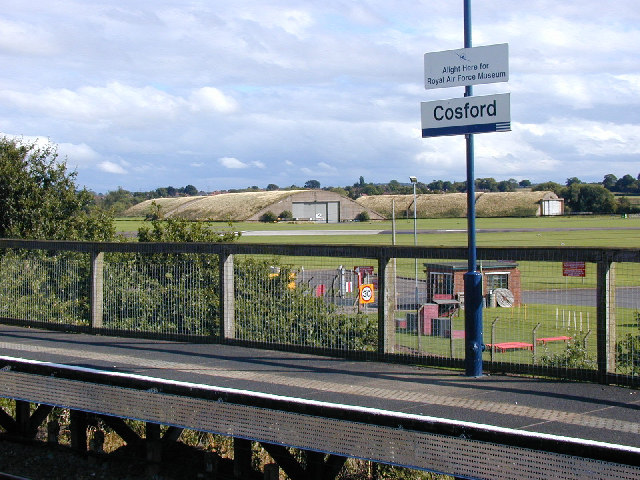
The pre-2012 station with wooden platforms. The aerodrome can be seen in the background.

The line between Shrewsbury and Wolverhampton was opened as a through route in November 1849. Cosford station was opened much later than other stations on the line when the decision was taken to site an RAF base there just before the start of the Second World War. Originally the station was known as Cosford Aerodrome Halt, but due to wartime security concerns, this was shortened to just Cosford in 1940. Trains originally ran to Wolverhampton Low Level and the GWR main line to Birmingham Snow Hill eastbound, but were diverted to Wolverhampton High Level and the ex-LNWR Stour Valley line to Birmingham New Street in 1967.

=== 2011-12 reconstruction ===
The station was closed to passengers from 29 October 2011 until 30 April 2012. Costing £2.1 million, Network Rail replaced the wooden 1937 station buildings as well as the platforms, which were constructed from century-old wood railway sleepers with the new platforms made from glass reinforced polymer, and the stairs leading up to them. Its re-opening was delayed by five weeks. The redevelopment has been criticised for a lack of disabled access.

== Signal box ==
The most recent Cosford signal box stood a little to the west of the station. As well as forming a block post this signal box controlled entrance and exit to up and down refuge loops and the previous rail connection into the adjacent RAF site from the up refuge loop. It has been abolished as a result of the 2006 resignalling scheme with control passing to Madeley Junction. Much of the redundant signalling equipment has been distributed to various heritage railways, the Gloucestershire Warwickshire Railway is believed to have received the majority. This structure is thought to have been the last signal box constructed by the Great Western Railway in Shropshire. Much of the contents and structure of this 1939 constructed signalbox has been salvaged for reuse on another heritage railway. The remaining brickwork was demolished in the small hours of Sunday 21 October 2007. Remarkably, the signalman's portacabin style privy remains in-situ as of late August 2008. The advent of longer trains destined for Ironbridge Power Station resulted in much reduced used of the refuge loops as they were too short to accommodate the length of coal trains that were in use until the closure of the power station in 2015.

== Services ==
Cosford is typically served Monday to Saturday by one train per hour in each direction between Birmingham New Street and Shrewsbury via Wolverhampton, with extra trains at peak times on weekdays. These services are operated by West Midlands Trains under the 'West Midlands Railway' brand using British Rail Class 196 DMUs. One Transport for Wales service calls per day after midnight, westbound only to Telford and Shrewsbury. Sunday services are hourly calling at all stations, with an additional nighttime Transport for Wales service heading eastbound to Wolverhampton on Sundays only.

Additional services run on the second Sunday in June when the RAF Cosford Air Show is being held.

Preceding station	National Rail	Following station
Albrighton	Transport for Wales; Wolverhampton–Shrewsbury line	Shifnal
Albrighton	West Midlands Railway; Wolverhampton–Shrewsbury line	Shifnal
	Previous services	
Wolverhampton	Wrexham & Shropshire London – Wrexham	Telford Central
