= Bilbrook railway station =

Railway station in Staffordshire, England

Coordinates: 52.624°N 2.186°W

Bilbrook
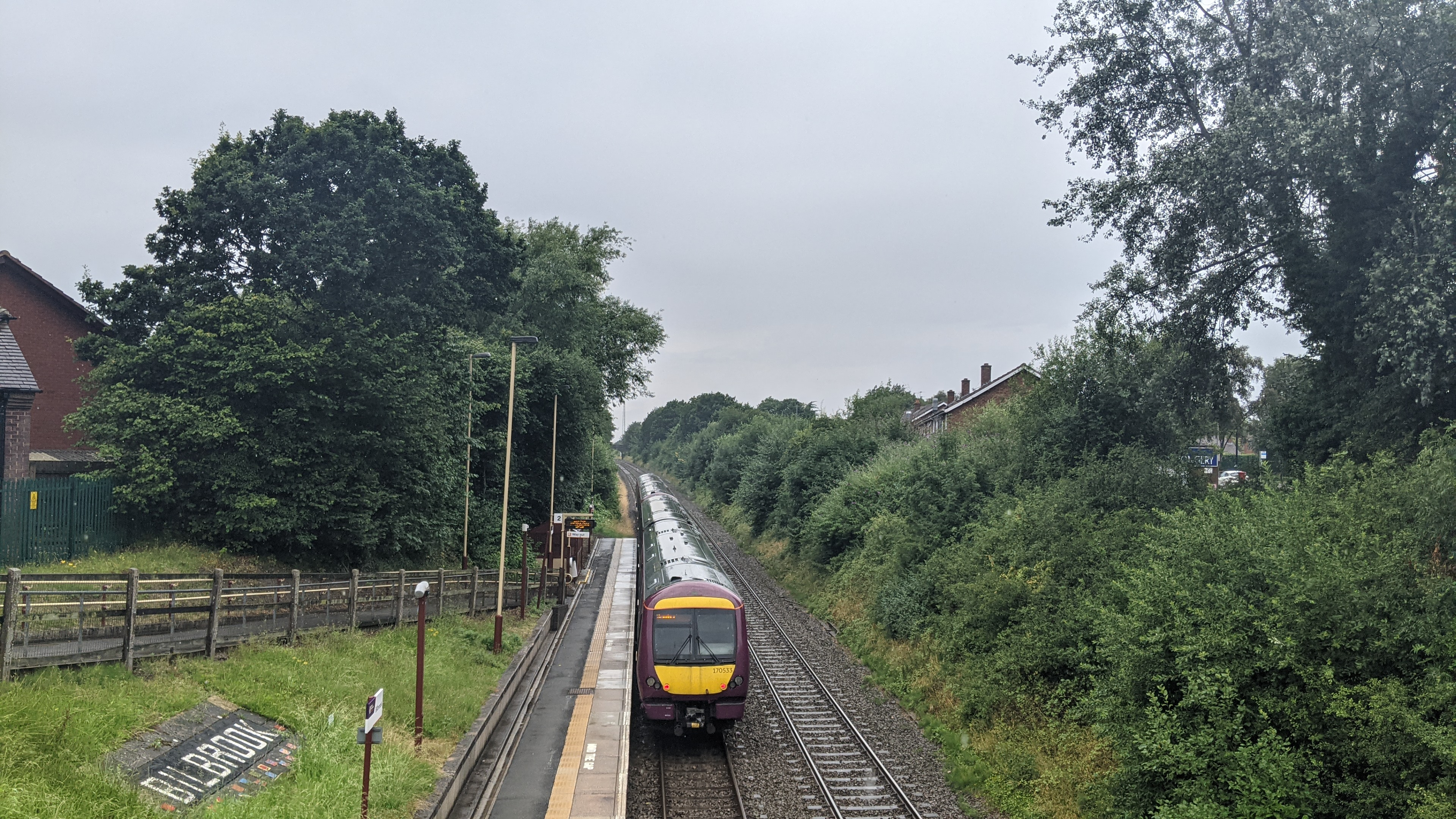

General information
- Location: Bilbrook, South Staffordshire; England
- Grid reference: SJ875028
- Manager: West Midlands Railway
- Platforms: 2

Other information
- Station code: BBK
- Classification: DfT category F2

History
- Opened: 30 April 1934

Passengers
- 2021/22: ▲79,802
- 2022/23: ▲102,336
- 2023/24: ▲0.135 million
- 2024/25: ▲0.139 million
- 2025/26: ▲0.150 million
Location
Notes
- Passenger statistics from the Office of Rail and Road

Bilbrook railway station is a railway station which serves the village of Bilbrook in Staffordshire, England. It was known as Birches and Bilbrook Halt when opened, being renamed to Bilbrook on 6 May 1974.

== Services ==
Bilbrook is typically served by one train per hour in each direction between Birmingham New Street and Shrewsbury via Wolverhampton which calls at all local stations on the Wolverhampton–Shrewsbury line. There is also an additional service in each direction in the morning and evening peak. These services are operated by West Midlands Trains with 1 Transport for Wales service a day Monday-Saturday and 2 a day on Sundays. On Sundays, there is one train every hour in each direction operated by West Midlands Trains which calls at all local stations from Wolverhampton to Shrewsbury. West Midlands Railway operate these services using Class 196 DMUs.

== Facilities ==
The station is unstaffed, but there is a ticket machine on platform 1 and covered waiting areas on both platforms. There is a nearby bus stop with services operated by National Express West Midlands.

Preceding station	National Rail	Following station
Wolverhampton	West Midlands Railway; Birmingham-Wolverhampton-Shrewsbury	Codsall
Wolverhampton	Transport for Wales; Birmingham - Wolverhampton - Chester	Codsall
	Disused railways	
Dunstall Park	Great Western Railway; Wolverhampton-Shrewsbury (1854-1968)	Codsall
