= Cargo-D =

English railway carriage company

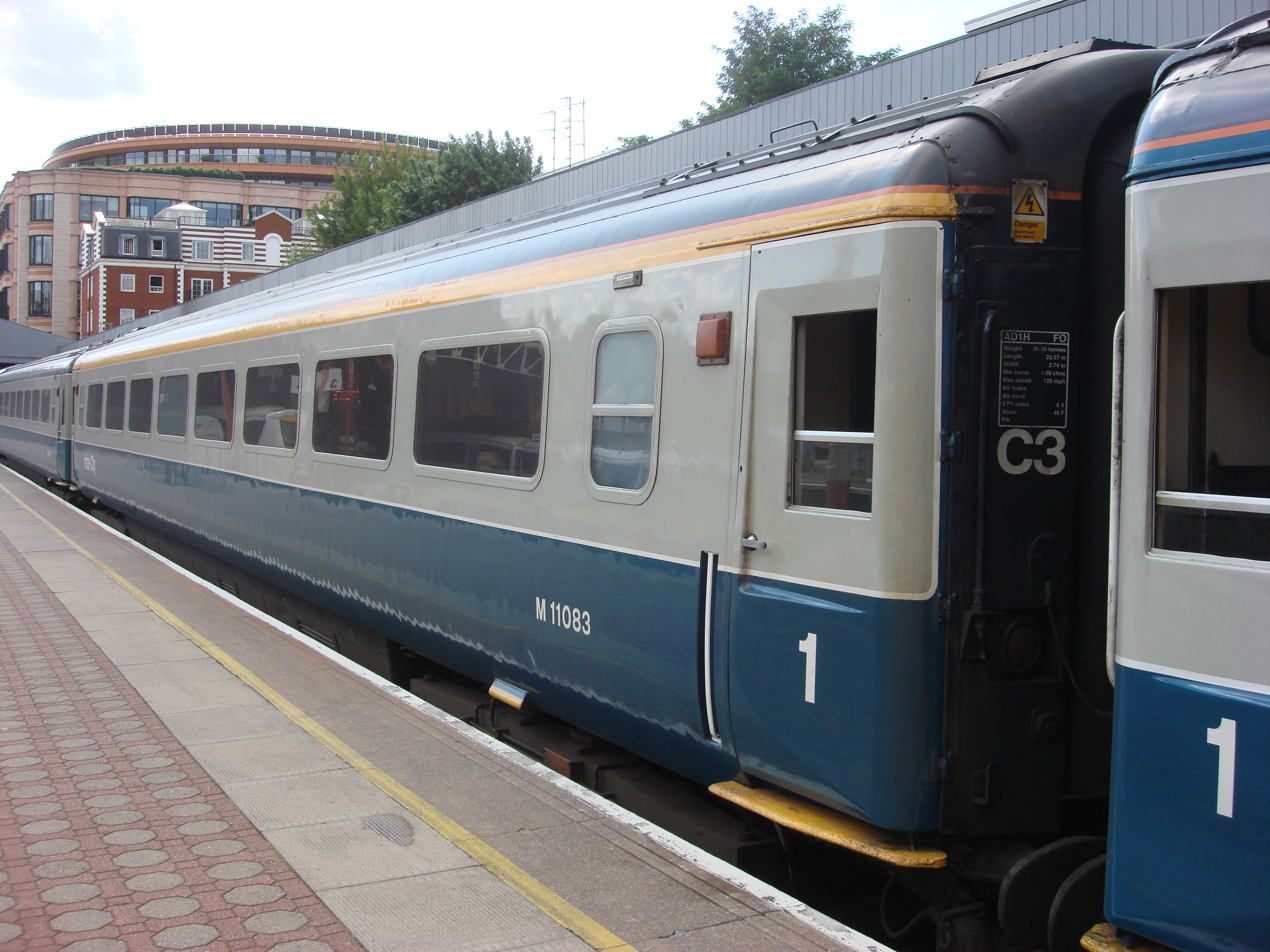
- Mark 3 at Marylebone in September 2008
- Founded: 2007
- Defunct: 2011
- Area served: United Kingdom
- Services: Railway carriage operator
- Owner: Mark Honey
- Website: www.cargo-d.co.uk

Cargo-D was a spot hire railway carriage company in England. It commenced operations in June 2007, ceasing in October 2011.

== History ==
In June 2007, Cargo-D entered the railway carriage market with a rake of British Rail Mark 2 and Mark 3 carriages that were prepared for service at Long Marston. They were painted in British Rail blue and grey livery.

In January 2008 it commenced a contract to hire Mark 3s to First Hull Trains for weekend London King's Cross to Doncaster services. In April 2008, Cargo-D commenced providing Mark 3s to Wrexham & Shropshire while its own Mark 3s were overhauled for service. In December 2008, it commenced a contract to provide four Mark 2s to First Great Western for a Cardiff to Taunton service.

In 2009, it commenced a contract to provide a Mark 3 set to Virgin Trains West Coast for a Fridays only service from London Euston to Preston.

In October 2011, Cargo-D was placed in administration and the carriages sold. At this stage, Cargo-D owned 35 Mark 2s and 18 Mark 3s.
