= Wolverhampton–Shrewsbury line =

Railway line in the West Midlands, England

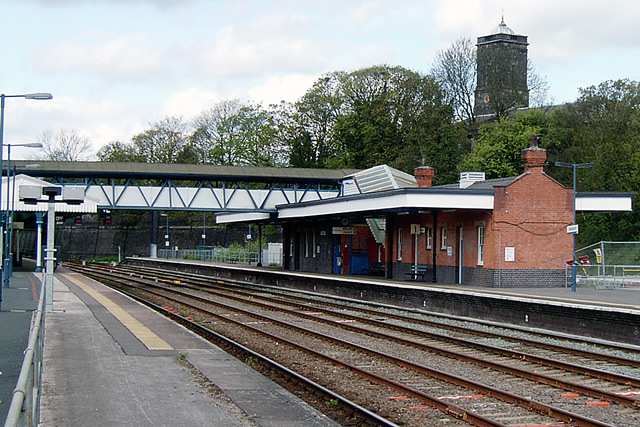
- Wellington station

Overview
- Owner: Network Rail
- Locale: West Midlands, Staffordshire, Shropshire
- Termini: Wolverhampton, Shrewsbury

Service
- Rolling stock: Class 150 Sprinter, Class 153 Super Sprinter, Class 158 Express Sprinter, Class 196 Civity

Technical
- Track gauge: 1,435 mm (4 ft 8 1/2 in) standard gauge
Route map
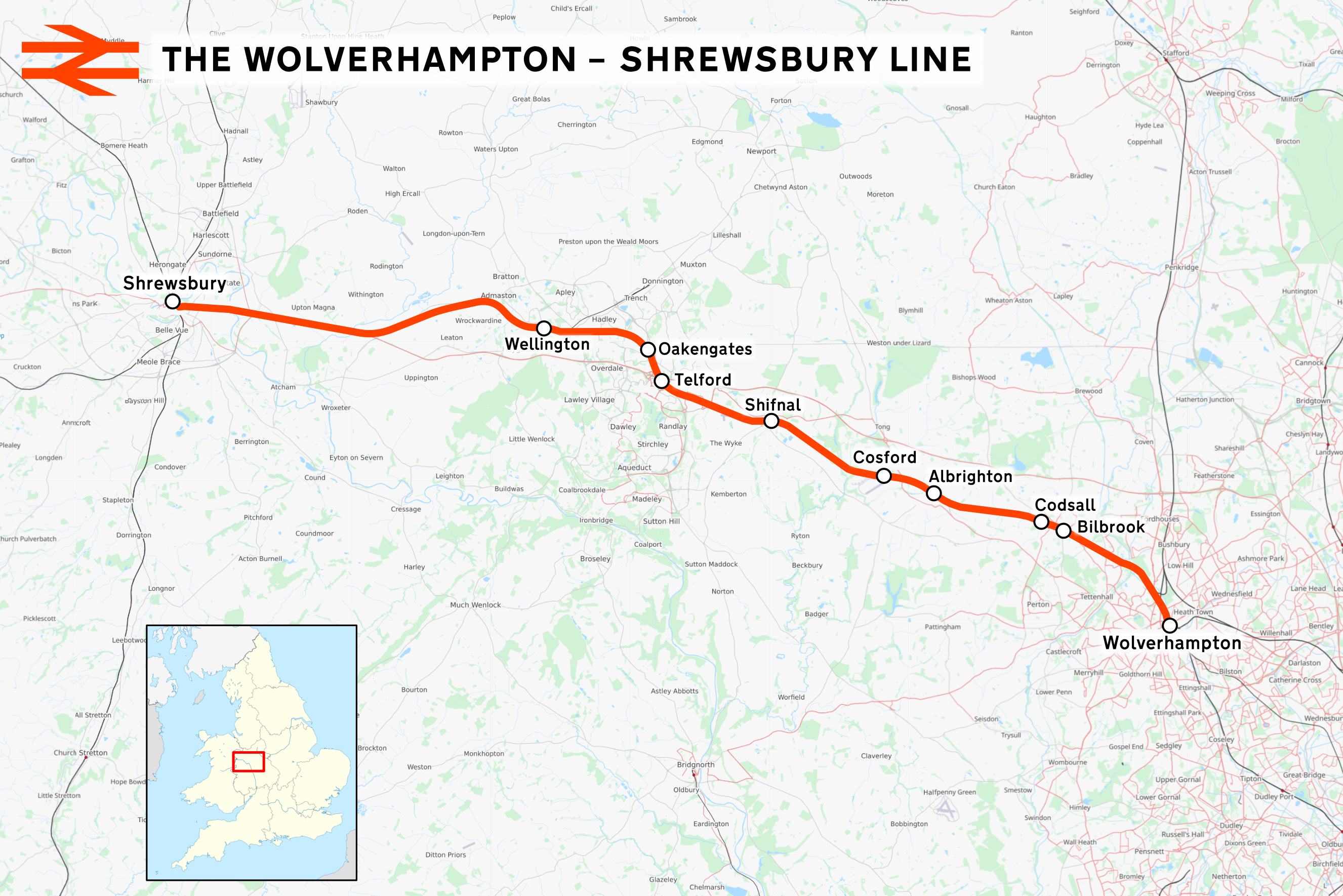
(Click to expand)

The Wolverhampton–Shrewsbury line is a railway line that connects Wolverhampton with Shrewsbury, via Wellington; it was originally built by the Shrewsbury and Birmingham Railway. The line is double tracked throughout, with rarely-used relief sidings at Cosford.

Electrification from Stafford Road Junction to Oxley is provided solely to enable electric stock to access Alstom's Oxley TRSMD and is therefore constructed as a "trolley wire" suitable for low speeds only.

Signalling was centred in the panel box at Madeley Junction until 2012 but, following the closure of the box there, the West Midlands Signalling Centre at Saltley has taken control of most of the route via its Oxley/Telford workstation. Previously, Oxley signal box controlled the depot access and sidings until it closed on 27 November 2010, under the West Midlands Resignalling scheme. Towards Shrewsbury, Abbey Foregate signal box takes over for the last few miles beyond Wellington.

The line also had a service to Walsall, which ran to Wellington, but this was cut back to Wolverhampton and then eventually withdrawn altogether.

== History ==
The line was opened by the Shrewsbury and Birmingham Railway (S&BR) in 1849, which merged with the Great Western Railway (GWR) in 1854. In GWR days, until the 1960s, it formed part of an important main line route from London Paddington to Birkenhead Woodside. The line historically ran into GWR's Wolverhampton Low Level station, before the latter was closed to passenger services in 1972; it now runs into the nearby former High Level station.

Telford Central was opened on the line by British Rail in 1986, to serve the new town of Telford, which had grown up along its route since the late 1960s.

== Route ==
The towns and villages served by the route are listed below from east to west:

West Midlands:

- Wolverhampton – 6 platforms.

Staffordshire:

- Bilbrook – 2 platforms
- Codsall – 2 platforms.

Shropshire:

- Albrighton – 2 platforms
- Cosford – 2 platforms
- Shifnal – 2 platforms
- Telford – 2 platforms
- Oakengates – 2 platforms
- Wellington – 3 platforms
- Shrewsbury – 5 platforms.

The map includes the former GWR Madeley Branch, which formed a connection from Madeley Junction to the Wellington to Craven Arms Railway at Lightmoor Junction.

== Services ==
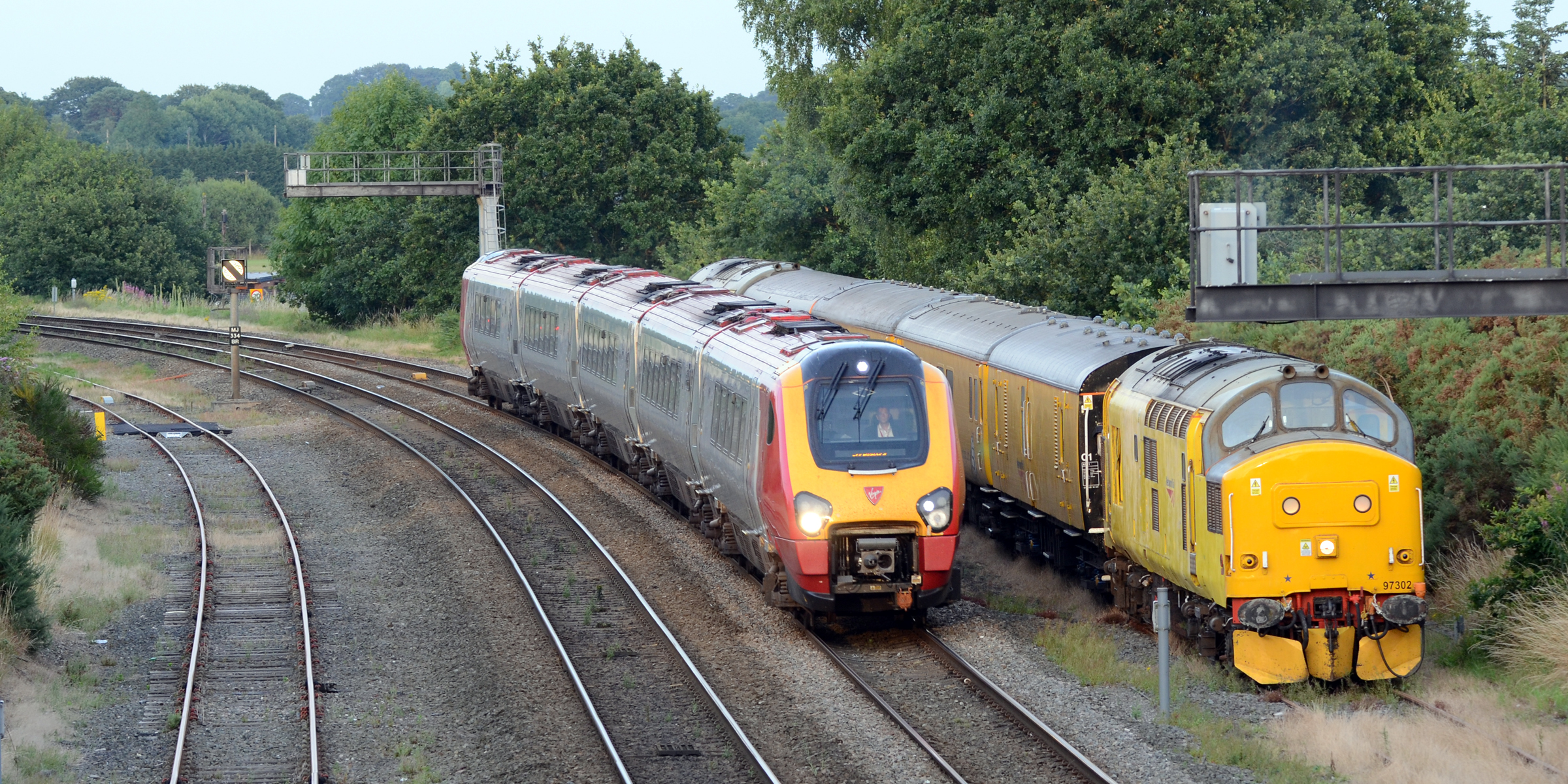
Cosford loops, with a measurement train waiting for a path

Services are operated by two train operating companies:

- West Midlands Railway operates two services per hour in each direction on the line; these alternate between a stopping service calling at all local stations to Wolverhampton before continuing to Birmingham New Street via Willenhall, Darlaston and Tame Bridge Parkway, and a semi-fast service calling at Wellington, Telford Central, Shifnal, Wolverhampton and Smethwick Galton Bridge. These services are operated using Class 196 diesel multiple units (DMUs), which were introduced into service in late 2022 and early 2023, following the withdrawal of Class 170 DMUs.
- Transport for Wales operates one service per hour in each direction on the line; this service calls at Telford Central and Wellington only before continuing to Birmingham International eastbound or to Chester, Holyhead, Pwllheli, Aberystwyth or Wrexham General when heading westbound. These services are typically operated with Class 158 DMUs, but sometimes use Class 150 or Class 153.

=== Former services ===
From December 2014 to June 2024, Virgin Trains and subsequently Avanti West Coast ran a daily return services between Shrewsbury and London Euston, calling at Wellington and Telford Central. These services were operated using Class 221 DEMUs.

== Freight ==
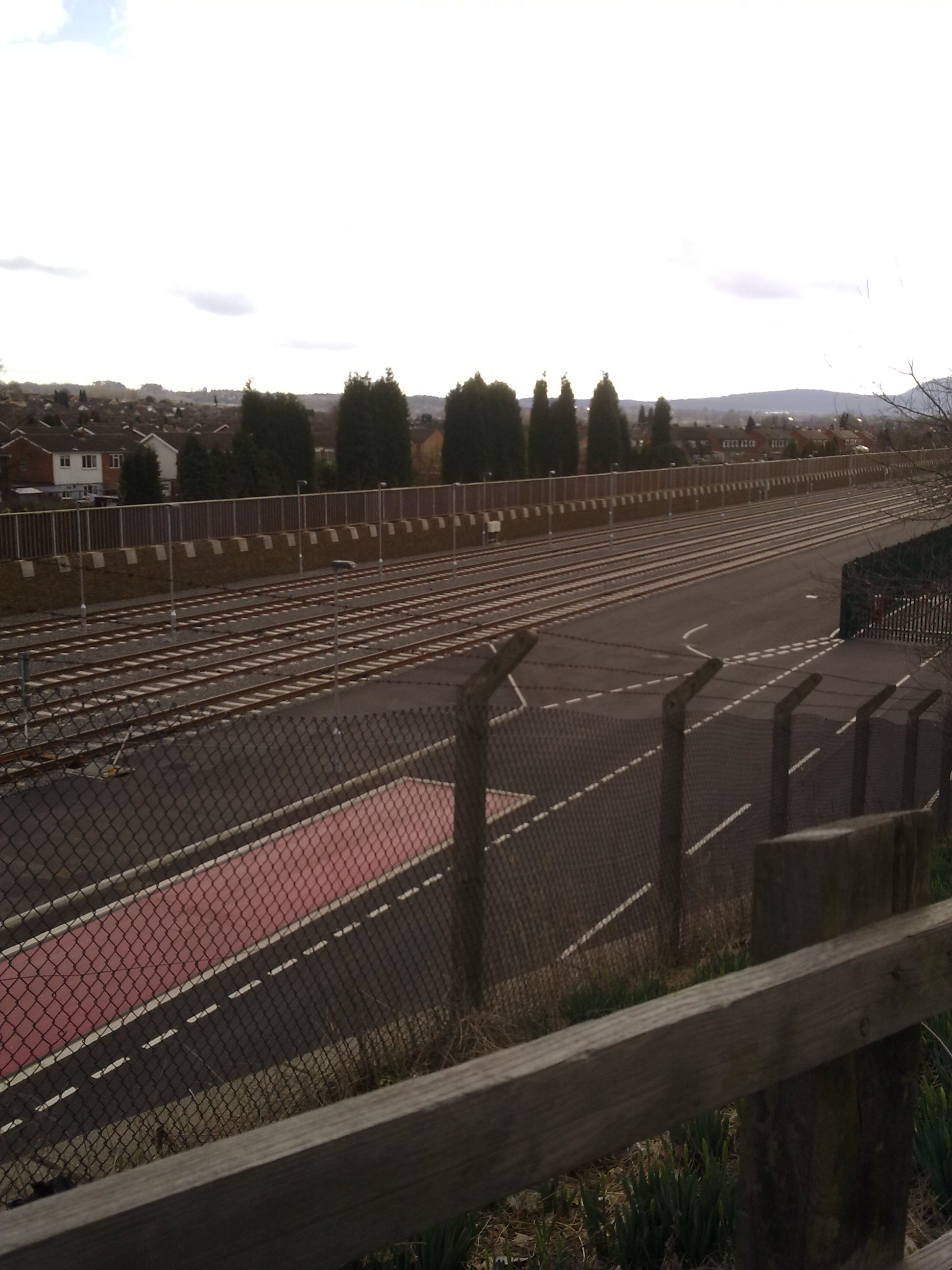
Telford Railfreight Depot

The Coalbrookdale line, which served Ironbridge Power Station to the south of Telford near Ironbridge, joined the Wolverhampton–Shrewsbury line at Madeley Junction, which is between Telford Central and Shifnal stations. Coal trains ran by EWS up to 2012 and by Fastline up to 2010 used the route, supplying the power station. Between 2012 and 2015, the power station was converted to run on biomass which was supplied mostly via Liverpool Docks by GBRf trains until closure of the plant in November 2015.

In 2008, the former Wellington to Stafford line was rebuilt as far as Donnington, for freight use. Telford International Railfreight Park is located at a 48 acres (0.19 km^{2}) site just off the Hortonwood Roundabout near Donnington which opened in 2009. The reopened line is single track and runs for 2 miles 68 chains (4.6 km) from the junction with the Wolverhampton–Shrewsbury line at Wellington (0.25 miles (0.40 km) east of Wellington station). Currently the only rail business to and from the site is Ministry of Defence traffic which runs down from Warrington so only uses a brief portion of the line between Shrewsbury and Wellington.

== See also ==
- Shrewsbury and Birmingham Railway
- Railways of Shropshire
