= Shrewsbury railway station =

Grade II listed railway station in Shropshire, England

Shrewsbury
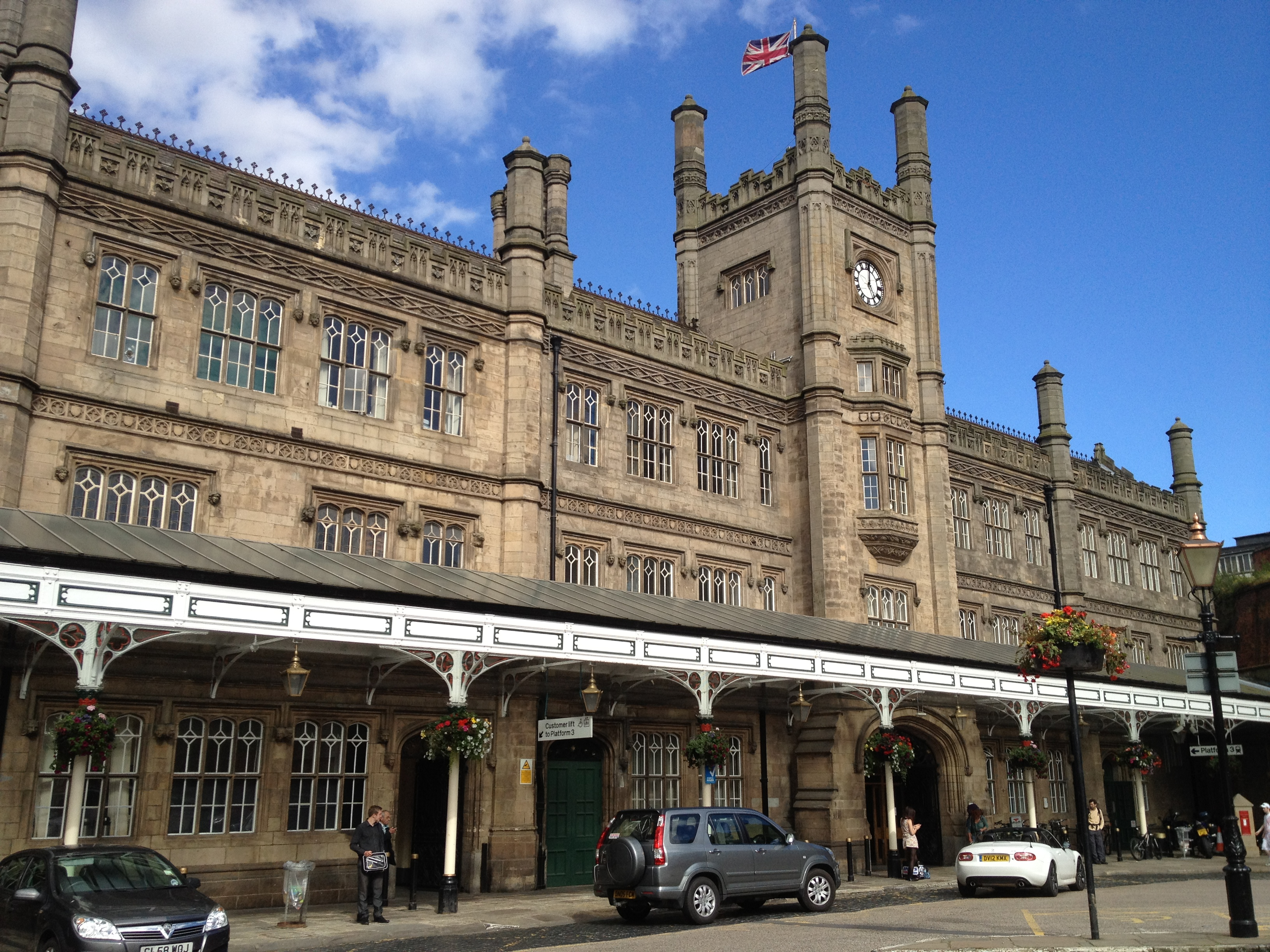
- Shrewsbury station frontage

General information
- Location: Shrewsbury, Shropshire; England
- Grid reference: SJ494129
- Manager: Transport for Wales
- Lines: Welsh Marches; Wolverhampton–Shrewsbury; Shrewsbury–Chester; Cambrian
- Platforms: 5 (numbered 3-7)

Other information
- Station code: SHR
- Classification: DfT category C1

Key dates
- 1848: Opened

Passengers
- 2020/21: ▼0.550 million
- Interchange: ▼27,369
- 2021/22: ▲1.582 million
- Interchange: ▲0.116 million
- 2022/23: ▲1.848 million
- Interchange: ▲0.194 million
- 2023/24: ▲2.013 million
- Interchange: ▲0.257 million
- 2024/25: ▲2.321 million
- Interchange: ▼0.245 million
Location
Notes
- Passenger statistics from the Office of Rail and Road

Shrewsbury railway station serves the town of Shrewsbury, in Shropshire, England. Built in 1848, it was designated a grade II listed building in 1969. Many services starting at or passing through the station are bound for Wales, and it is a key hub for its operator, Transport for Wales; services are also provided by West Midlands Railway.

== History ==
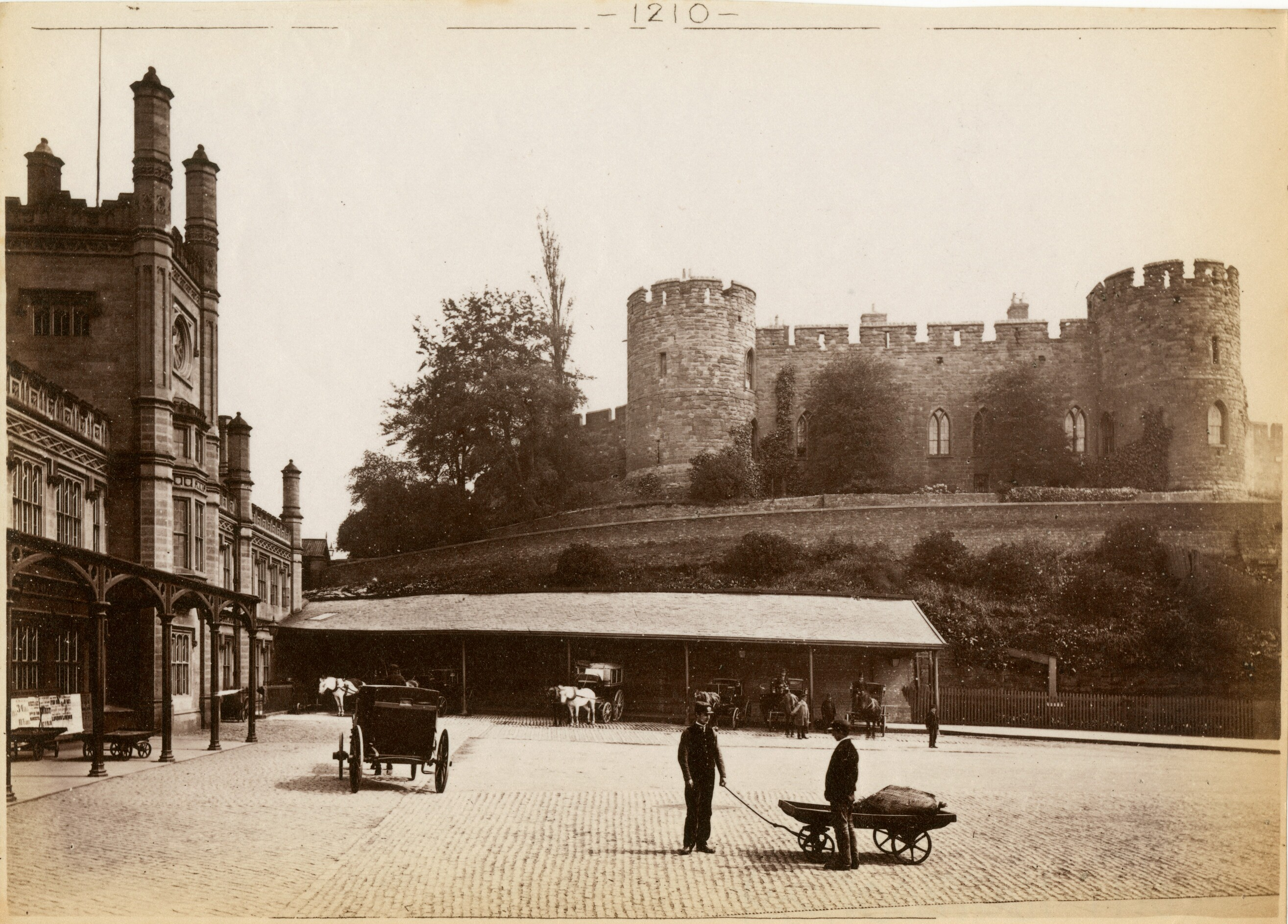
Shrewsbury railway station and castle by Francis Bedford, c. 1863–-1884

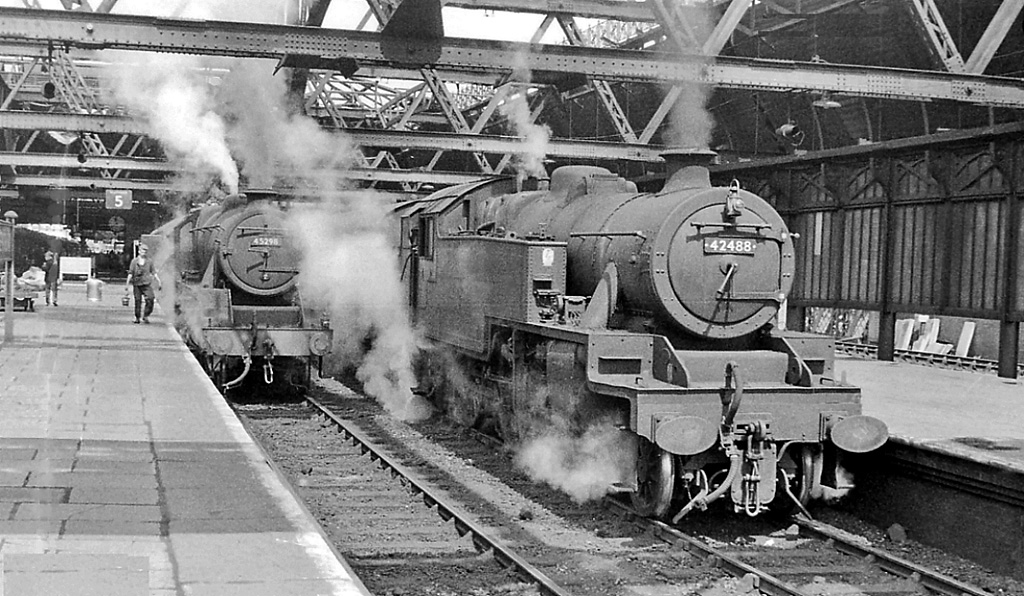
Station south end in 1962

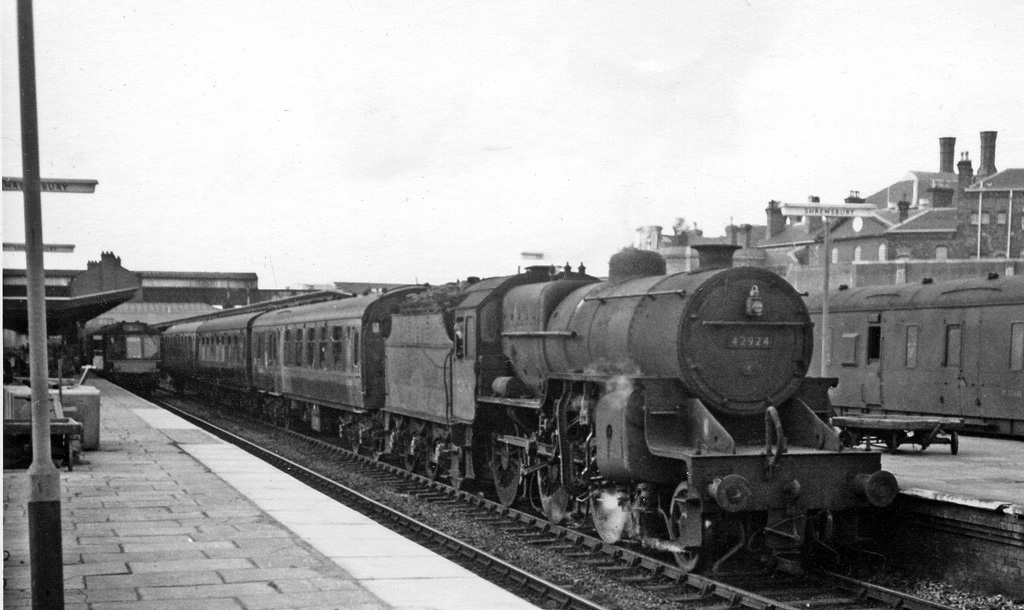
Stopping train at Shrewsbury station in 1965

The station was formerly known as Shrewsbury General and is the only remaining railway station in the town; others, including Shrewsbury Abbey, have long since closed.

Shrewsbury railway station was originally built in October 1848 for the county's first railway, the Shrewsbury to Chester Line. The architect was Thomas Mainwaring Penson of Oswestry and the contractor was Thomas Brassey. The building is unusual, in that the station was extended between 1899 and 1903 by the construction of a new floor underneath the original station building. The building style was imitation Tudor, complete with carvings of Tudor style heads around the window frames. This was done to match the Tudor building of Shrewsbury School (now Shrewsbury Library) almost directly opposite and uphill from the station. The station's platforms also extend over the River Severn. It was operated jointly by the Great Western Railway (GWR) and the London and North Western Railway (LNWR).

At Shrewsbury in steam days, the GWR regularly turned its locomotives by running round the triangle formed by using the Abbey Foregate loop, which links the Wolverhampton Line with the Welsh Marches Line and enables through running for freight trains, summer Saturday specials and formerly for trains like the Cambrian Coast Express. Until 1967, Shrewsbury was served by the GWR, latterly BR Western Region, express services between London Paddington and Birkenhead Woodside.

The station was given Grade II listed status in May 1969; this applies to the main building on Castle Foregate, adjacent to platform 3.

Arwel Hughes composed Tydi a roddaist (You gave) in 20 minutes during a wait between train connections in 1938. A plaque to mark this was unveiled on platform 3 in 2004.

== Signalling ==
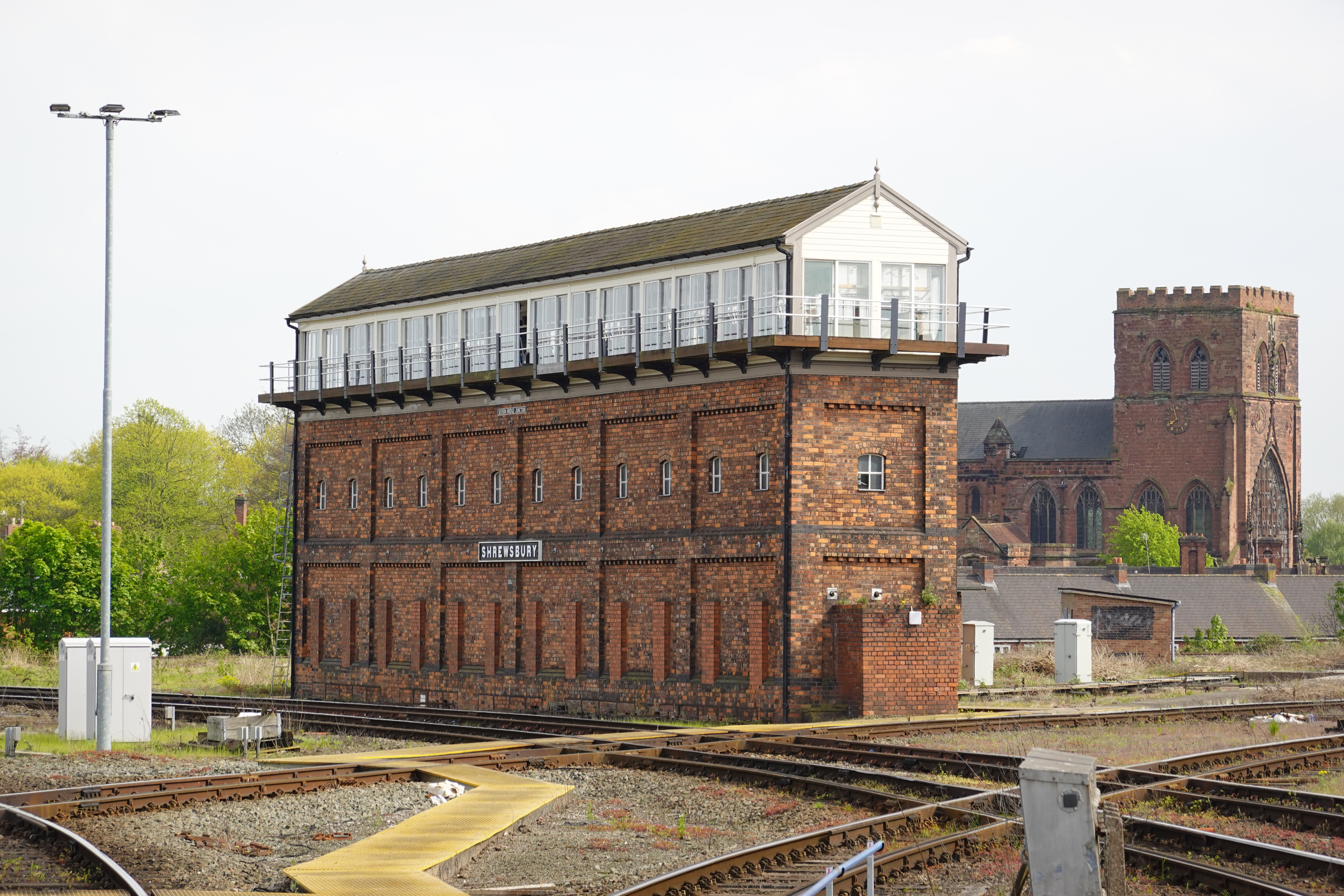
Shrewsbury Severn Bridge Junction Signal Box

Severn Bridge Junction signal box, at the south east end of the station and built by the LNWR, is the largest surviving mechanical signal box in the world, with a frame accommodating 180 levers, and is a listed building. Whilst the line beyond Abbey Foregate signal box to Wolverhampton has been updated to electronic signalling, Shrewsbury itself is set to remain lever operated for the foreseeable future. As a result of Shrewsbury's joint (GWR/LNWR) history, and having been transferred at different times between the Western and London Midland regions of BR and more recently Network Rail – it is now in the Great Western territory again – the signalling is a diverse mixture of lower-quadrant and upper-quadrant semaphore signals, with a few colour lights too. Crewe Junction, on the north end of the station, accommodates around 120 levers and is of the same design as Severn Bridge Junction.

The other Shrewsbury signal boxes are at Abbey Foregate (to a GWR design), controlling the eastern corner of the triangle and Sutton Bridge Junction, where the Aberystwyth line diverges from the Hereford line (the now closed Severn Valley Railway to Bridgnorth and Hartlebury also left the main line there).

Two other boxes at Crewe Bank (to a 1940s LMS design) (52.7175°N 2.7477°W) and Harlescott Crossing (to an 1860s GWR design) (52.7379°N 2.7287°W) (both near the Shrewsbury end of the line to Crewe) were both abolished in October 2013, when the Crewe line had its signalling replaced by a new modular system controlled from the South Wales Rail Operating Centre in Cardiff. The box at Harlescott Crossing was subsequently demolished. The former box had been "switched out" of use for several years previously and had been proposed for abolition by Network Rail back in 2009.

In Autumn 2010 changes were made to allow Cambrian and Welsh Marches line trains to depart in a southerly direction from platform 3. An upper quadrant signal replaced the previous shunting disc and a facing point lock was added to the points. Though the track layout could already accommodate this, until the lock was added only non-passenger movements southbound from platform 3 could be made.

== Platforms and facilities ==
There are five platforms in use, numbered 3 to 7 (platforms 1 and 2 have been disused since the 1980s and have no track; around 2019 platform 2 was dismantled). Of these, platforms 4 to 7 are grouped on a main island, while platforms 1 to 3 are separate, located by the main station building. The platforms are numbered in order from west (Shrewsbury Castle side) to east (The Dana side) from 1 to 7.

Platform 3 was until recently only used by trains running in from the Wolverhampton direction and out towards Chester. Changes made in 2010 to the signalling and track now allow additional passenger trains (those coming in from and going out to the Hereford, Heart of Wales and Cambrian lines) to use platform 3. A passenger lift was opened on the platform in 2009 and a waiting room opened shortly after. A lift was previously built for access to platforms 4–7, with the additional platform 3 lift making the station fully accessible for wheelchair and mobility-impaired users.

Platforms 4 and 7 are through platforms, usually used for trains between Holyhead (via Chester and Wrexham General) and Cardiff Central/Birmingham International and between Manchester Piccadilly (via Crewe) and Cardiff Central, Carmarthen, and Milford Haven. Platforms 5 and 6 are bay platforms, used mainly for trains to and from Aberystwyth and Birmingham, as well as trains for the Heart of Wales Line and local stopping trains to Birmingham New Street.

The island platforms are connected to the main station building and platform 3 by a pedestrian subway running underneath the station. A pedestrian footbridge over the platforms still exists but has long been disconnected from the station; instead, it is a public walkway allowing pedestrians to cross over the station area, and part of a route named "The Dana". All platforms are fitted with CIS screens and automatic announcement speakers and there are customer help points on platforms 3 and 4. A Starbucks, toilets, and vending machines selling snacks and drinks are sited between platforms 4 and 7. As of November 2024, a small coffee shop has opened in the former information centre on the ground floor of the main station building before the ticket gates.

Ticket gates are in operation at the entrance to platforms 4 to 7, with the nearby ticket office staffed throughout the week. Self-service ticket machines are also available for buying tickets or collecting tickets for pre-booked journeys.

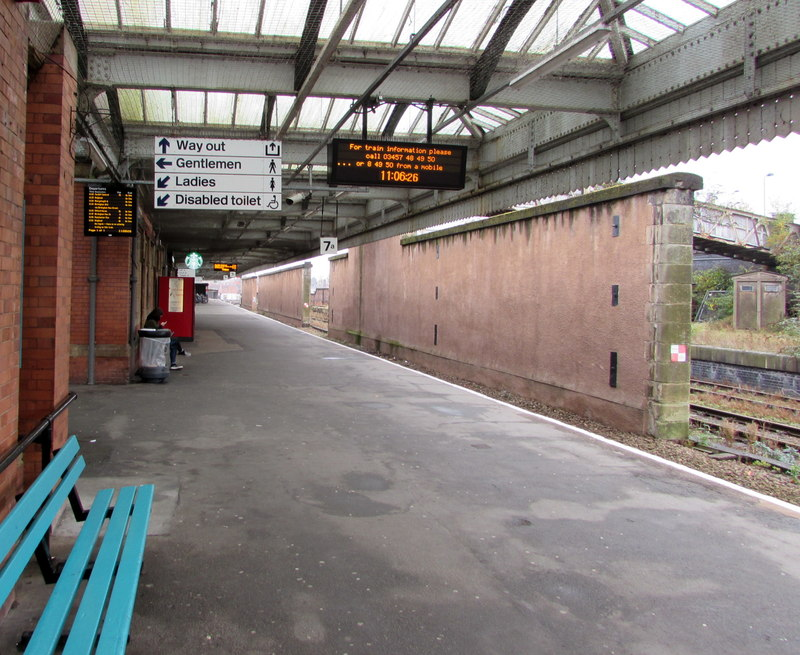
Wall separating "platform 8"

Opposite platform 7 is a high wall that divides the rest of the station from what could be considered to be platform 8. This platform does not see any use and was built for the use of transporting prisoners from HM Prison Shrewsbury. (The prison gateway, surmounted by bust of prison reformer John Howard, is visible from platform 7.) It is believed that this platform was only used a few times each year between 1868 up until just before the First World War.

== Services ==
=== Transport for Wales ===
- Alternate hourly service from Holyhead via Chester and Wrexham General to Birmingham International or Cardiff Central.
- Two-hourly services from Aberystwyth and Pwllheli via the Cambrian Line to Birmingham International which merge at Machynlleth. Some additional Aberystwyth trains start and finish here at certain times of day. Some late evening services also terminate at Machynlleth.
- Hourly services from Manchester Piccadilly to Cardiff Central via the Welsh Marches Line. Most services on this route extend to Swansea and Carmarthen, with through running to Milford Haven every two hours. Some services terminate at Tenby, Maesteg or Pembroke Dock. There is also a two-hourly local stopping service to Crewe on this route.
- Services via the Heart of Wales Line to Swansea. Five trains per day each way Monday–Saturday (plus one service to Llandrindod Wells except Saturdays) and two trains each way on Sundays.
- Locomotive-hauled Premier Service between Holyhead and Cardiff Central via Chester. Three trains each way per day.
- Local Stopping services to Wrexham General (morning & late evening only)

All of the services above are operated by Class 150s, Class 153s, Class 158s or Class 197s, except the Premier Service which is operated by a Class 67 and Mark 4 coaching stock.

=== West Midlands Railway ===
- 1 train per hour to Birmingham New Street via Tame Bridge Parkway operated by Class 196s, calling at all stations.
- 1 train per hour semi-fast to Birmingham New Street, calling at Wellington, Telford Central, Shifnal, Wolverhampton and Smethwick Galton Bridge.

=== Former services ===
Prior to the June 2024 timetable change, Avanti West Coast operated a daily direct service to and from London Euston via Birmingham New Street and Coventry, with Class 221s

Preceding station	National Rail	Following station
Terminus	Transport for Wales; Shrewsbury–Chester line	Gobowen
Church Stretton	Transport for Wales; Welsh Marches line	Yorton
Church Stretton	Transport for Wales; South – North Wales	Gobowen
Church Stretton	Transport for Wales; Heart of Wales line	Terminus
Newport	Transport for Wales; Premier Service	Wrexham General
Wellington	Transport for Wales; Cambrian Line	Welshpool or Terminus
Wellington	Transport for Wales; Birmingham – Chester	Gobowen
Wellington	West Midlands Railway; Birmingham – Wolverhampton – Shrewsbury	Terminus
	Historical railways	
Terminus	Great Western Railway; Shrewsbury to Chester Line	Leaton; Line open, station closed
Terminus	London, Midland and Scottish Railway; Crewe and Shrewsbury Railway	Hadnall; Line open, station closed
Terminus	Great Western Railway; Severn Valley Railway	Berrington; Line and station closed
Terminus	Shrewsbury and Welshpool Railway	Hanwood; Line open, station closed
Terminus	Shrewsbury and Wellington Joint Railway; Shrewsbury and Birmingham Railway	Abbey Foregate; Line open, station closed

== Accidents and incidents ==
- On 15 October 1907, a mail train hauled by Experiment class locomotive No. 2052 Stephenson was derailed at Shrewsbury due to excessive speed on a curve. Eighteen people were killed.
- On 6 November 2017, an Arriva Trains Wales Class 175 DMU, numbered 175109, caught fire, causing the station to be evacuated for approximately two hours. There were no casualties but significant travel disruption occurred.

== See also ==
- Listed buildings in Shrewsbury (southeast central area)
- Shrewsbury Traction Maintenance Depot
- Railways of Shropshire
