= List of United Kingdom locations: X-Z =

The United Kingdom

This is part of the list of United Kingdom locations: a gazetteer of place names in the United Kingdom showing each place's locality and geographical coordinates.

== Y ==
Location	Locality	Coordinates (links to map & photo sources)	OS grid reference
Y Bont-Faen (Cowbridge)	The Vale Of Glamorgan	51.45°N 03.45°W	SS9974
Y Felinheli (Port Dinorwig)	Gwynedd	53.17°N 04.21°W	SH5267
Y Fenni (Abergavenny)	Monmouthshire	51.82°N 03.03°W	SO2914
Y Ferwig	Ceredigion	52.10°N 04.65°W	SN1849
Y Fflint (Flint)	Flintshire	53.23°N 03.14°W	SJ2472
Y Ffôr	Gwynedd	52.91°N 04.39°W	SH3938
y-Ffrith	Denbighshire	53.33°N 03.44°W	SJ0483
Y Gelli Gandryll	Powys	52.07°N 03.13°W	SO2242
Y Gribyn	Powys	52.50°N 03.59°W	SN9291

=== Ya ===
Location	Locality	Coordinates (links to map & photo sources)	OS grid reference
Yaddlethorpe	North Lincolnshire	53.55°N 00.67°W	SE8807
Yafford	Isle of Wight	50.62°N 01.37°W	SZ4481
Yafforth	North Yorkshire	54.34°N 01.47°W	SE3494
Yair	Scottish Borders	55.57°N 02.87°W	NT4532
Yalberton	Devon	50.41°N 03.60°W	SX8658
Yalding	Kent	51.22°N 00.43°E	TQ7050
Yanley	North Somerset	51.41°N 02.64°W	ST5569
Yanworth	Gloucestershire	51.81°N 01.89°W	SP0713
Yapham	East Riding of Yorkshire	53.94°N 00.81°W	SE7851
Yapton	West Sussex	50.81°N 00.62°W	SU9703
Yarberry	North Somerset	51.30°N 02.87°W	ST3957
Yarborough	North East Lincolnshire	53.56°N 00.11°W	TA2509
Yarbridge	Isle of Wight	50.67°N 01.15°W	SZ6086
Yarburgh	Lincolnshire	53.41°N 00.03°E	TF3593
Yarcombe	Devon	50.86°N 03.08°W	ST2408
Yarde	Somerset	51.14°N 03.34°W	ST0639
Yardhurst	Kent	51.13°N 00.78°E	TQ9541
Yardley	Birmingham	52.46°N 01.82°W	SP1285
Yardley Gobion	Northamptonshire	52.08°N 00.89°W	SP7644
Yardley Hastings	Northamptonshire	52.19°N 00.74°W	SP8656
Yardley Wood	Birmingham	52.41°N 01.85°W	SP1080
Yardro	Powys	52.21°N 03.14°W	SO2258
Yarford	Somerset	51.05°N 03.14°W	ST2029
Yarhampton	Worcestershire	52.30°N 02.33°W	SO7767
Yarhampton Cross	Worcestershire	52.30°N 02.33°W	SO7767
Yarkhill	Herefordshire	52.07°N 02.58°W	SO6042
Yarley	Somerset	51.20°N 02.71°W	ST5045
Yarlington	Somerset	51.05°N 02.50°W	ST6529
Yarlside	Cumbria	54.11°N 03.19°W	SD2269
Yarm	Stockton-on-Tees	54.50°N 01.36°W	NZ4112
Yarmouth	Isle of Wight	50.69°N 01.50°W	SZ3589
Yarnacott	Devon	51.05°N 03.97°W	SS6230
Yarnbrook	Wiltshire	51.28°N 02.20°W	ST8654
Yarnfield	Staffordshire	52.88°N 02.20°W	SJ8632
Yarningale Common	Warwickshire	52.29°N 01.72°W	SP1966
Yarnscombe	Devon	50.98°N 04.05°W	SS5623
Yarnton	Oxfordshire	51.80°N 01.31°W	SP4712
Yarpole	Herefordshire	52.27°N 02.77°W	SO4764
Yarrow	Northumberland	55.17°N 02.45°W	NY7187
Yarrow	Scottish Borders	55.53°N 03.03°W	NT3527
Yarrow	Somerset	51.21°N 02.88°W	ST3847
Yarrow Feus	Scottish Borders	55.51°N 03.04°W	NT3425
Yarrowford	Scottish Borders	55.56°N 02.95°W	NT4030
Yarsop	Herefordshire	52.11°N 02.87°W	SO4047
Yarwell	Northamptonshire	52.56°N 00.43°W	TL0697
Yate	South Gloucestershire	51.53°N 02.41°W	ST7182
Yateley	Hampshire	51.33°N 00.83°W	SU8160
Yate Rocks	South Gloucestershire	51.55°N 02.40°W	ST7284
Yatesbury	Wiltshire	51.43°N 01.91°W	SU0671
Yattendon	Berkshire	51.46°N 01.20°W	SU5574
Yatton	Herefordshire	52.28°N 02.85°W	SO4266
Yatton	North Somerset	51.38°N 02.83°W	ST4265
Yatton Keynell	Wiltshire	51.48°N 02.20°W	ST8676
Yaverland	Isle of Wight	50.66°N 01.13°W	SZ6185
Yawl	Devon	50.74°N 02.97°W	SY3194
Yawthorpe	Lincolnshire	53.40°N 00.66°W	SK8991
Yaxham	Norfolk	52.65°N 00.97°E	TG0110
Yaxley	Cambridgeshire	52.51°N 00.26°W	TL1892
Yaxley	Suffolk	52.31°N 01.10°E	TM1273
Yazor	Herefordshire	52.10°N 02.87°W	SO4046

=== Ye ===
Location	Locality	Coordinates (links to map & photo sources)	OS grid reference
Yeabridge	Somerset	50.93°N 02.79°W	ST4415
Yeading	Hillingdon	51.52°N 00.40°W	TQ1182
Yeadon	Leeds	53.85°N 01.69°W	SE2040
Yealand Conyers	Lancashire	54.15°N 02.76°W	SD5074
Yealand Redmayne	Lancashire	54.16°N 02.76°W	SD5075
Yealand Storrs	Lancashire	54.17°N 02.78°W	SD4976
Yealmbridge	Devon	50.34°N 03.98°W	SX5951
Yealmpton	Devon	50.34°N 04.01°W	SX5751
Yearby	Redcar and Cleveland	54.58°N 01.07°W	NZ6021
Yearngill	Cumbria	54.78°N 03.33°W	NY1444
Yearsley	North Yorkshire	54.15°N 01.11°W	SE5874
Yeaton	Shropshire	52.76°N 02.84°W	SJ4319
Yeaveley	Derbyshire	52.95°N 01.73°W	SK1840
Yedingham	North Yorkshire	54.19°N 00.63°W	SE8979
Yelden	Bedfordshire	52.29°N 00.52°W	TL0167
Yeldersley Hollies	Derbyshire	52.98°N 01.67°W	SK2243
Yelford	Oxfordshire	51.73°N 01.48°W	SP3604
Yell	Shetland Islands	60.57°N 01.10°W	HU489886
Yelland	Devon	51.05°N 04.15°W	SS4931
Yelling	Cambridgeshire	52.24°N 00.15°W	TL2662
Yelsted	Kent	51.32°N 00.61°E	TQ8262
Yelvertoft	Northamptonshire	52.37°N 01.13°W	SP5975
Yelverton	Devon	50.48°N 04.08°W	SX5267
Yelverton	Norfolk	52.56°N 01.37°E	TG2902
Yenston	Somerset	50.98°N 02.41°W	ST7121
Yeoford	Devon	50.76°N 03.73°W	SX7898
Yeolmbridge	Cornwall	50.65°N 04.39°W	SX3187
Yeo Mill	Devon	51.02°N 03.65°W	SS8426
Yeo Vale	Devon	50.98°N 04.25°W	SS4223
Yeovil	Somerset	50.94°N 02.64°W	ST5516
Yeovil Marsh	Somerset	50.95°N 02.65°W	ST5418
Yeovilton	Somerset	50.99°N 02.65°W	ST5422
Yerbeston	Pembrokeshire	51.73°N 04.81°W	SN0608
Yesnaby	Orkney Islands	59.01°N 03.36°W	HY2215
Yetlington	Northumberland	55.37°N 01.96°W	NU0209
Yetminster	Dorset	50.88°N 02.58°W	ST5910
Yett	North Lanarkshire	55.80°N 03.96°W	NS7759
Yettington	Devon	50.65°N 03.34°W	SY0585
Yetts o' Muckhart	Clackmannanshire	56.19°N 03.61°W	NO0001
Yew Green	Warwickshire	52.30°N 01.67°W	SP2267
Yewhedges	Kent	51.26°N 00.80°E	TQ9655
Yew Tree	Sandwell	52.55°N 01.97°W	SP0295
Yew Tree	Tameside	53.47°N 02.07°W	SJ9597
Yewtree Cross	Kent	51.12°N 01.08°E	TR1641

=== Yi-Yn ===
Location	Locality	Coordinates (links to map & photo sources)	OS grid reference
Yieldshields	South Lanarkshire	55.73°N 03.80°W	NS8750
Yiewsley	Hillingdon	51.50°N 00.47°W	TQ0680
Ynus-tawelog	Swansea	51.76°N 04.00°W	SN6209
Ynyns Deullyn	Pembrokeshire	51.95°N 05.13°W	SM847336
Ynysboeth	Rhondda, Cynon, Taff	51.65°N 03.34°W	ST0796
Ynysddu	Caerphilly	51.62°N 03.20°W	ST1792
Ynysforgan	Swansea	51.67°N 03.92°W	SS6799
Ynyshir	Rhondda, Cynon, Taff	51.61°N 03.41°W	ST0292
Ynys-isaf	Powys	51.78°N 03.75°W	SN7911
Ynyslas	Ceredigion	52.50°N 04.06°W	SN6092
Ynys-Lochtyn	Ceredigion	52.16°N 04.46°W	SN317546
Ynysmaerdy	Neath Port Talbot	51.63°N 03.82°W	SS7495
Ynysmaerdy	Rhondda, Cynon, Taff	51.54°N 03.40°W	ST0384
Ynysmeudwy	Neath Port Talbot	51.72°N 03.84°W	SN7305
Ynysowen	Merthyr Tydfil	51.68°N 03.34°W	ST0799
Ynys Tachwedd	Ceredigion	52.51°N 04.06°W	SN6093
Ynystawe	Swansea	51.68°N 03.91°W	SN6800
Ynyswen	Powys	51.80°N 03.69°W	SN8313
Ynyswen	Rhondda, Cynon, Taff	51.66°N 03.51°W	SS9597
Ynysybwl	Rhondda, Cynon, Taff	51.63°N 03.37°W	ST0594
Ynysygwas	Neath Port Talbot	51.60°N 03.76°W	SS7891

=== Yo ===
Location	Locality	Coordinates (links to map & photo sources)	OS grid reference
Yockenthwaite	North Yorkshire	54.20°N 02.15°W	SD9079
Yockleton	Shropshire	52.68°N 02.88°W	SJ4010
Yondercott	Devon	50.90°N 03.32°W	ST0712
Yokefleet	East Riding of Yorkshire	53.70°N 00.77°W	SE8124
Yoker	City of Glasgow	55.89°N 04.38°W	NS5169
Yondertown	Devon	50.41°N 03.98°W	SX5959
Yondover	Dorset	50.73°N 02.72°W	SY4993
Yopps Green	Kent	51.26°N 00.29°E	TQ6054
York	Lancashire	53.79°N 02.45°W	SD7033
York	North Yorkshire	53.95°N 01.10°W	SE5951
Yorkhill	City of Glasgow	55.85°N 04.30°W	NS5665
Yorkletts	Kent	51.32°N 00.99°E	TR0963
Yorkley	Gloucestershire	51.75°N 02.53°W	SO6306
Yorkley Slade	Gloucestershire	51.76°N 02.52°W	SO6407
York Town	Hampshire	51.32°N 00.76°W	SU8659
Yorton	Shropshire	52.80°N 02.74°W	SJ5023
Yorton Heath	Shropshire	52.79°N 02.74°W	SJ5022
Yottenfews	Cumbria	54.43°N 03.49°W	NY0305
Youlgreave	Derbyshire	53.17°N 01.68°W	SK2164
Youlthorpe	East Riding of Yorkshire	53.98°N 00.84°W	SE7655
Youlton	North Yorkshire	54.06°N 01.25°W	SE4963
Youngsbury	Hertfordshire	51.84°N 00.01°W	TL3718
Young's End	Essex	51.84°N 00.51°E	TL7319
Young Wood	Lincolnshire	53.22°N 00.30°W	TF1371
Yoxall	Staffordshire	52.75°N 01.79°W	SK1418
Yoxford	Suffolk	52.25°N 01.50°E	TM3968

=== Yr-Yt ===
Location	Locality	Coordinates (links to map & photo sources)	OS grid reference
Yr Hôb (Hope)	Flintshire	53.11°N 03.04°W	SJ3058
Yr Wyddgrug (Mold)	Flintshire	53.15°N 03.15°W	SJ2363
Ysbyty Cynfyn	Ceredigion	52.39°N 03.83°W	SN7579
Ysbyty Ifan	Conwy	53.01°N 03.73°W	SH8448
Ysbyty Ystwyth	Ceredigion	52.32°N 03.86°W	SN7371
Ysceifiog	Flintshire	53.22°N 03.27°W	SJ1571
Ysgeibion	Denbighshire	53.11°N 03.40°W	SJ0658
Yspitty	Carmarthenshire	51.66°N 04.09°W	SS5598
Ystalyfera	Neath Port Talbot	51.75°N 03.79°W	SN7608
Ystrad	Rhondda, Cynon, Taff	51.64°N 03.47°W	SS9895
Ystrad Aeron	Ceredigion	52.18°N 04.16°W	SN5256
Ystradfellte	Powys	51.80°N 03.56°W	SN9213
Ystradgynlais	Powys	51.77°N 03.76°W	SN7810
Ystradmeurig	Ceredigion	52.28°N 03.90°W	SN7067
Ystrad Mynach	Caerphilly	51.63°N 03.24°W	ST1494
Ystradowen	Neath Port Talbot	51.79°N 03.81°W	SN7512
Ystradowen	The Vale Of Glamorgan	51.48°N 03.42°W	ST0177
Ystrad Uchaf	Powys	52.62°N 03.37°W	SJ0704
Ystumtuen	Ceredigion	52.38°N 03.86°W	SN7378
Ythanbank	Aberdeenshire	57.39°N 02.16°W	NJ9034
Ythanwells	Aberdeenshire	57.43°N 02.61°W	NJ6338

== Z ==
=== Ze ===
Location	Locality	Coordinates (links to map & photo sources)	OS grid reference
Zeal Monachorum	Devon	50.82°N 03.81°W	SS7204
Zeals	Wiltshire	51.07°N 02.31°W	ST7831
Zelah	Cornwall	50.31°N 05.07°W	SW8151
Zennor	Cornwall	50.18°N 05.57°W	SW4538

=== Zo ===
Location	Locality	Coordinates (links to map & photo sources)	OS grid reference
Zoar	Cornwall	50.02°N 05.12°W	SW7619
Zone Point	Cornwall	50.14°N 05.00°W	SW851314
Zouch	Nottinghamshire	52.80°N 01.25°W	SK5023
