= Yorton =

Village in Shropshire, England

Coordinates: 52.809°N 2.736°W

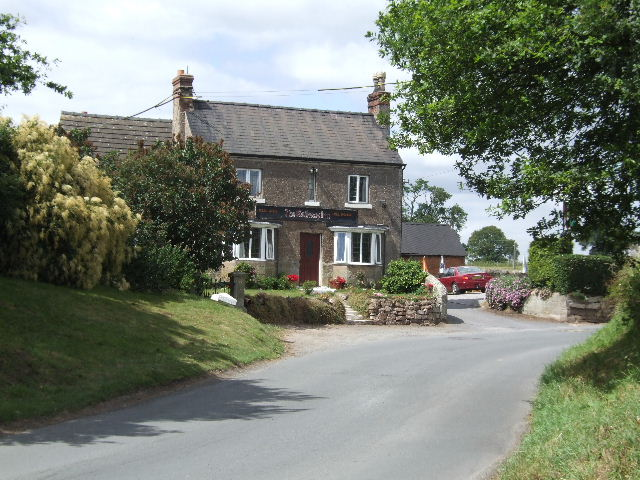
- The Railway Inn public house, Yorton

- Location within Shropshire
- OS grid reference: SJ503237
- Civil parish: Clive
- Unitary authority: Shropshire
- Ceremonial county: Shropshire
- Region: West Midlands
- Country: England
- Sovereign state: United Kingdom
- Post town: SHREWSBURY
- Postcode district: SY4
- Dialling code: 01939
- Police: West Mercia
- Fire: Shropshire
- Ambulance: West Midlands
- UK Parliament: North Shropshire

Yorton is a small village in Shropshire, England, north of the county town of Shrewsbury and south of the town of Wem.

== Governance ==
Yorton is represented in the unitary Shropshire Council and the North Shropshire constituency of the Parliament of the United Kingdom.

== Transport ==
=== Railway ===
Yorton railway station is located on the Welsh Marches Line between Wem and Shrewsbury. The station is a request stop. The station also serves the nearby larger village of Clive. The station primarily offers services between Shrewsbury and Crewe, stopping at Wem, Prees, Whitchurch, Wrenbury and Nantwich. The station is also served by morning peak services southbound to Wolverhampton, Birmingham New Street and Birmingham International, as well as evening peak services southbound to Hereford, Newport, Cardiff Central, Swansea, Carmarthen and Milford Haven and northbound to Wilmslow, Stockport and Manchester Piccadilly.

=== Bus ===
The village is served by the 511 bus route, operated by Arriva Midlands North, which runs between Shrewsbury and Whitchurch via Wem. Some services terminate in Wem and do not continue to Whitchurch.

Bus services in Yorton, Shropshire
Bus operator	Route	Destination(s)	Notes
Arriva Midlands North	511	Shrewsbury → Hadnall → Wem → Prees → Whitchurch	Some services terminate in Wem
