= Clive, Shropshire =

Village in Shropshire, England

Coordinates: 52.811°N 2.721°W

Clive
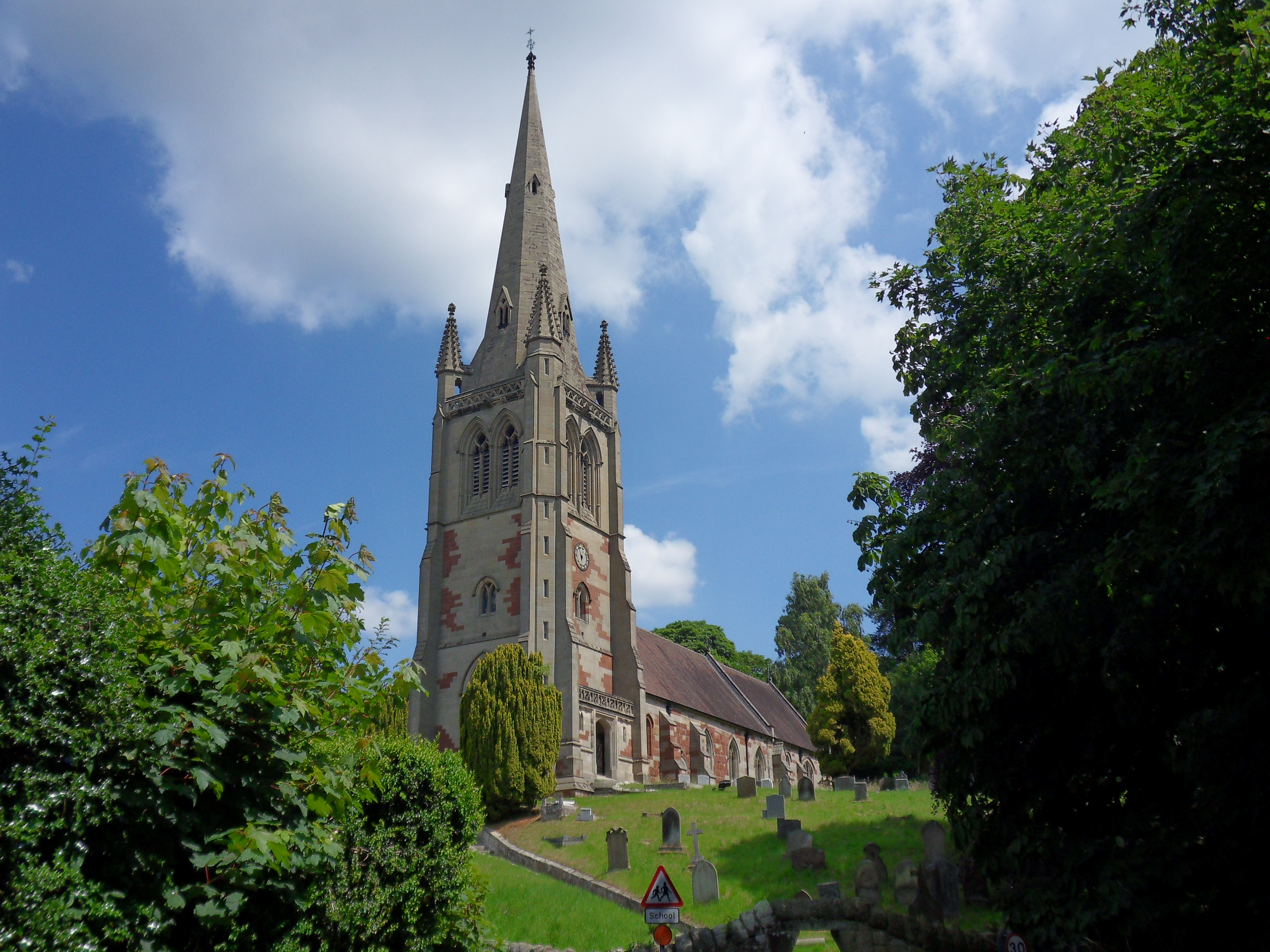
- All Saints Church, Clive

- Location within Shropshire
- Population: 530 (2011)
- OS grid reference: SJ514239
- Civil parish: Clive
- Unitary authority: Shropshire
- Ceremonial county: Shropshire
- Region: West Midlands
- Country: England
- Sovereign state: United Kingdom
- Post town: SHREWSBURY
- Postcode district: SY4
- Dialling code: 01939
- Police: West Mercia
- Fire: Shropshire
- Ambulance: West Midlands
- UK Parliament: North Shropshire

Clive is a village and civil parish in Shropshire, England, United Kingdom.

Clive is situated around the west side of Grinshill Hill. Grinshill sandstone, from the nearby quarry at Grinshill is used throughout the village for building material from walls and houses to the village church.

The English Restoration dramatist, William Wycherley (1641 – 1716) was born at Clive.

== Travel ==
=== Road ===
Clive is situated just off the A49, and the B5476.

=== Rail ===
The village is served by Yorton railway station, located on the Welsh Marches Line between Shrewsbury and Wem. The majority of services are between Shrewsbury and Crewe, operated by Transport for Wales, as well as some additional services to Manchester Piccadilly, Hereford, Cardiff Central, Swansea and Carmarthen.

=== Bus ===
The village is served by the 511 bus route, operated by Arriva Midlands North, which runs between Shrewsbury and Whitchurch via Wem. Some services terminate in Wem and do not continue to Whitchurch.

Bus services in Clive, Shropshire
Bus operator	Route	Destination(s)	Notes
Arriva Midlands North	511	Shrewsbury → Hadnall → Wem → Prees → Whitchurch	Some services terminate in Wem.

== Community life and local services ==
In the centre of the village is All Saints church which holds regular services. The vicar is Revd. Paul Cawthorne. The church's spire houses six bells, the eleventh heaviest six-peal of bells in the world.

Clive Church of England primary school is situated halfway up Grinshill Hill.

It has a monthly news letter with input from the local community.

Regular evening classes, from computing to weaving, are held in the village hall, where the Post office, which is open weekly on Monday and Wednesday, also operates.

The village is served by a mechanics, a car dealership, a doctors' surgery, a hairdressers, and a number of small businesses, such as decorators and electricians, are based in and around the village.

== Local governance ==
The parish council has nine members.

The village is located in the Shawbury ward of Shropshire Council. This has been represented by Alison Williams (Liberal Democrats) since 2024.

== See also ==
- Listed buildings in Clive, Shropshire
