= Prees Higher Heath =

Coordinates: 52.91930008°N 2.65030415°W

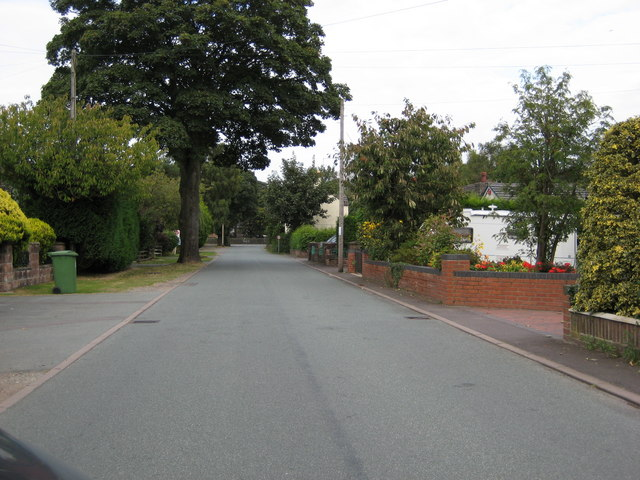
- Heathwood Road joins the A41

- Location within Shropshire
- Population: 1,163
- OS grid reference: SJ56373596
- Civil parish: Prees
- Unitary authority: Shropshire
- Ceremonial county: Shropshire
- Region: West Midlands
- Country: England
- Sovereign state: United Kingdom
- Post town: WHITCHURCH
- Postcode district: SY13
- Dialling code: 01948
- Police: West Mercia
- Fire: Shropshire
- Ambulance: West Midlands
- UK Parliament: North Shropshire

Prees Higher Heath (commonly shortened to Higher Heath) is a large village located within the civil parish of Prees in north Shropshire, England.

== Location ==
Prees Higher Heath is south of the town of Whitchurch, northeast of the small town of Wem and the village of Prees and west of Market Drayton. It is also north of the village of Prees Green and south of the villages of Tilstock and Prees Heath. The villages of Whixall and Edstaston are also west of the village.

== Population ==
The population in 2001 was recorded at 1,151, increasing to 1,163 as of the 2011 Census.

== Transport ==
=== Roads ===
The A49 and A41 roads pass on either side of the village.

=== Railway ===
There are two railway stations within a close distance to the village, the first of which is the railway station of Prees and the second is railway station of Whitchurch.

=== Bus ===
The village is served by the 511 bus route, operated by Arriva Midlands North, which runs between Shrewsbury and Whitchurch via Wem. Some services terminate in Wem and do not continue to Whitchurch. There is a total of nine bus stops in the village.

Bus services in Prees Higher Heath, Shropshire
Bus operator	Route	Destination(s)	Notes
Arriva Midlands North	511	Shrewsbury → Hadnall → Wem → Prees → Whitchurch	Some services terminate in Wem.

== See also ==
- Listed buildings in Prees
