= YRT =

YRT may refer to:

- York Region Transit, a transport operator in Ontario, Canada
- Yorton railway station, Shropshire, England (by CRS code)
- Youghiogheny River Trail, a path in McKeesport, Pennsylvania, United States
- Rankin Inlet Airport, Nunavut, Canada (by IATA code)
