= Listed buildings in Hadnall =

Hadnall is a civil parish in the district of Telford and Wrekin, Shropshire, England. It contains twelve listed buildings that are recorded in the National Heritage List for England. Of these, one is at Grade II*, the middle of the three grades, and the others are at Grade II, the lowest grade. The parish contains the village of Hadnall and the surrounding countryside. The listed buildings consist of houses and farmhouses with associated structures, a church, a windmill converted into a house, the lodge to a former mansion, a public house, and a charnel house.

== Key ==
Grade	Criteria
II*	Particularly important buildings of more than special interest
II	Buildings of national importance and special interest

== Buildings ==
Name and location	Photograph	Date	Notes	Grade
St Mary Magdalene's Church; 52.77595°N 2.70999°W		c. 1190	The oldest part of the church is the nave, it was altered in the 14th century, the tower dates from about 1840, and the church was restored in 1872–73, followed by the addition of the chancel and vestry. In 1903 the clerestory was added and the tower was altered. The church is built in Grinshill sandstone, and has tile roofs. It consists of a nave with a clerestory, a south porch, a chancel, a north vestry, and a west tower. The tower has three stages, diagonal buttresses, corner gargoyles, a stepped embattled parapet, and a pyramidal cap with a weathervane. In the nave are two Norman doorways, and the porch is timber framed with cruck construction.	II*
Hall Farmhouse; 52.77690°N 2.70862°W	—	Late 16th century	The farmhouse was extended in the 17th century, and partly rebuilt and further extended in the 19th century. The roof is tiled, and the earlier parts of the house are at the rear, and are timber framed with red brick nogging. This part consists of two parallel gabled ranges with one storey and an attic. They have jettied upper floors and gables with moulded bressumers, and there are gabled half-dormers. The front range has three storeys and three bays. In the centre is a sandstone porch with Tuscan columns, a frieze, a moulded cornice, and a triangular pediment. The doorway has pilasters, a moulded impost band, and a moulded cornice, and the windows are casements.	II
Smethcote Manor; 52.78338°N 2.73746°W	—	Early 17th century	The farmhouse was partly rebuilt in the 19th century. It is timber framed with brick nogging on a red sandstone plinth, partly rebuilt in brick painted to resemble timber framing, and with a slate roof. There are two storeys and an attic, a T-shaped plan consisting of a two-bay range, a gabled two-bay cross-wing, and a brick service wing with one storey and an attic recessed to the right. On the front is a gabled porch and a doorway with pilasters and a triangular pediment on shaped brackets. The windows are casements, and there are two gabled eaves dormers.	II
Hermitage Farmhouse; 52.77582°N 2.70940°W	—	Early to mid 17th century	The farmhouse was remodelled in the 18th century, and altered and extended in the 19th century. The original part is timber framed with brick nogging, it has been partly refaced, underbuilt and extended in brick, and the roofs are tiled. The extension has a dentil eaves cornice. There are two storeys and an L-shaped plan. The original part has one bay and a gabled cross-wing to the left. It contains casement windows and a gabled porch; the main gable and the porch gable have scalloped bargeboards and finials. The front facing the road has three bays and contains horizontally-sliding sash windows. The extension to the right contains sash windows, and there are lean-to additions at the rear.	II
Plex House; 52.78440°N 2.73869°W	—	Mid 17th century	A farmhouse. later a private house, it was altered and expanded in the 19th century. The early part is timber framed with brick nogging, and this has been refaced or rebuilt and extended in red brick. The roof is tiled, the house has two storeys and an attic, and an L-shaped plan, the original part with two bays, and the addition at the front with three bays. The addition has a moulded cornice, and parapeted and coped gables. The central porch has unfluted Doric columns and pilasters, a triglyph frieze, a cornice, and a blocking course, the doorway has a reeded impost band, and a radial fanlight with a keystone, and the windows are sashes. It was the home of Archdeacon The 11th Earl of Cavan, and was where he died in December 1950.	II
Former bakehouse, Smethcote Manor; 52.78338°N 2.73720°W	—	18th century	The bakehouse, later used for other purposes, is in red brick on a red sandstone plinth, with a dentil eaves cornice and a tile roof. It has one storey and a loft, and a lean-to on the right. On the front are two casement windows and a doorway, all with segmental heads, and in the left gable end is a loft door.	II
The Round House; 52.78501°N 2.70819°W	—	1787	Originally a windmill, it was remodelled in the 19th century, altered in the 20th century, and converted into a house. It is in red brick and has a circular plan with tapering sides, two storeys, and is in Gothic style. The doorway and the round-headed casement windows contain Y-tracery. In the upper floor are blind arrow loops, a datestone, and blocked square openings.	II
Hardwicke Lodge; 52.78804°N 2.70487°W	—	Early 19th century	The lodge to Hardwicke Grange, now demolished, was designed by Thomas Harrison in Tudor Revival style. It is in grey sandstone on a chamfered plinth, and has a moulded string course, an embattled parapet with chamfered coping, a slate roof, and one storey. The south front facing the drive has three bays, with a canted bay window in the middle bay, and Tudor arched doorways in the outer bays. The east front contains a cross-window with a hood mould. On the corner is a gateway that has a gate pier with a cruciform plan and a four-way gabled top, and a wrought iron gate.	II
Screen wall, Hardwicke Lodge; 52.78791°N 2.70487°W	—	Early 19th century	The screen wall to the south of the lodge is in grey sandstone. It has a chamfered plinth and coping, it is stepped up to the right, and is between about 2 metres (6 ft 7 in) and 3 metres (9.8 ft) high and about 3 metres (9.8 ft) long.	II
Haston Farmhouse; 52.78290°N 2.72802°W	—	Early 19th century	The farmhouse is in red brick with a dentil eaves cornice and a hipped slate roof. It has a square plan, three storeys and a basement, a front of three bays, sides of two bays, and a two-storey lean-to at the rear. The doorway has Tuscan columns, an entablature, a reeded impost band, and a three-light fanlight. Most of the windows are horizontally-sliding sashes, and there are some casement windows. On the right return external stone steps with wrought iron railings lead down to the basement door with a segmental head.	II
The Saracen's Head; 52.77647°N 2.70909°W		Early 19th century	A house, later a public house, it is in red brick on a sandstone plinth and has a slate roof. There are three storeys, a symmetrical front of three bays, two bays on the sides, and a two-storey rear wing. The central doorway has unfluted Greek Doric three-quarter columns, a three-light fanlight, a frieze and a triangular pediment, and the windows are sashes.	II
Charnel house 52.77619°N 2.71039°W	—	1903	The charnel house is incorporated in the churchyard wall of St Mary Magdalene's Church. It has two storeys, the lower storey is in grey sandstone with chamfered coping, the upper storey is timber framed with weatherboarding, and there is a hipped tile roof. The building contains a square window, a doorway, and narrow openings, and the roof extends to form a canopy.	II
