= Listed buildings in Clive, Shropshire =

Clive is a civil parish in Shropshire, England. It contains 14 listed buildings that are recorded in the National Heritage List for England. Of these, one is listed at Grade II*, the middle of the three grades, and the others are at Grade II, the lowest grade. The parish contains the village of Clive and the surrounding countryside. The listed buildings consist of a church with a memorial in the churchyard, houses, cottages and farmhouses with associated structures, and a boundary stone.

== Key ==
Grade	Criteria
II*	Particularly important buildings of more than special interest
II	Buildings of national importance and special interest

== Buildings ==
Name and location	Photograph	Date	Notes	Grade
All Saints Church; 52.81159°N 2.72132°W		c. 1190	The church was restored in 1849, it was largely rebuilt in 1885–87 by C. J. Ferguson, and in 1892–94 Ferguson added the steeple and the baptistry. The church is built in Grinshill sandstone and has tile roofs. It consists of a nave with a north porch, a chancel with a north vestry, and a west steeple. The steeple has a tower with three stages, gabled angle buttresses, an octagonal stair turret at the southwest, a pierced parapet, crocketed corner pinnacles, and flying buttresses to a broach spire that has lucarnes and a cross finial. Incorporated into the north wall and into the nave doorways is 12th-century material.	II*
Ivy House; 52.81173°N 2.72181°W	—	Early 17th century	The house was later remodelled and extended. The early part is timber framed with brick nogging, the extensions are in Grinshill sandstone, and the roof is slated. It has a three-bay range with two storeys, a single-bay extension to the right, and a rear wing of one storey with an attic. There is a gabled timber porch, the windows are casements with hood moulds, and there is a gabled half-dormer. Inside is an inglenook fireplace.	II
The Old Manor House or Clive Manor; 52.81333°N 2.72293°W	—	Early 17th century	The house was later altered. The original part is timber framed with brick nogging on a plinth of brick and sandstone. It was partly rebuilt in brick, partly rendered, and has a tile roof. It has a T-shaped plan, with a main range of three bays, and a gabled cross-wing to the west with two bays. The main range has two storeys and the wing has one storey and an attic. The windows are casements and at the rear are two gabled dormers.	II
Crows Cottage; 52.81368°N 2.72503°W	—	Early 18th century	A house in Grinshill sandstone on a rendered plinth with a band, a moulded eaves cornice, and a slate roof with parapeted gables and chamfered copings. There is one storey and an attic, a T-shaped plan, and a front of two bays. In the centre is a gabled timber porch and a doorway with a triple keystone. The windows are cross-windows with tripled keystones, and there are two gabled half-dormers.	II
Boundary stone 52.80929°N 2.71732°W	—	1765	The boundary stone is in grey sandstone and has a rectangular plan. Apart from the date the inscription is illegible.	II
Sansaw; 52.80354°N 2.72902°W		1773	A country house that was extended in 1888, it is in red brick with dressings in Grinshill sandstone and a hipped slate roof. The main block has three storeys and fronts of six and five bays. On each side quadrant wings connect with single-storey pavilions. The house has a plinth, a dentil cornice, and a balustraded parapet. On the garden front is a porch that has Ionic columns with square sections, and an entablature with a triglyph frieze and a cornice. On the entrance front is a Tuscan porch with an Ionic doorcase.	II
Ice house 52.80665°N 2.72704°W	—	Late 18th century	The ice house has a circular plan. It is excavated in natural sandstone and has a red brick dome covered in earth. The entrance is to the northwest and it has low flanking red brick walls.	II
Clive House; 52.81269°N 2.72151°W	—	Late 18th or early 19th century	The house was extended to the rear later in the 19th century, and it is in red brick with a slate roof. There are three storeys, a front of three bays, and two rear gabled wings with two storeys and attics. The windows are sashes with rusticated lintels. The doorway has a reeded impost band and a radial fanlight, and in front of it is a 20th-century porch incorporating a doorcase dating from about 1800 with reeded pilasters and dentilled open triangular pediments.	II
Clive Wood Farmhouse; 52.81993°N 2.71737°W	—	Early 19th century	The farmhouse is in red brick on a red sandstone plinth, with a dentil eaves cornice and a hipped slate roof. There are two storeys and a basement, and sides of three bays. It has a Greek Doric porch with unfluted columns and pilasters, and an entablature, and the doorway has a reeded impost band and a radial fanlight. The windows are sashes with stone lintels.	II
Shooter's Hill; 52.82766°N 2.73347°W	—	c. 1830	A farmhouse in stuccoed brick on a plinth, with end pilasters, a string course, a reeded frieze, a dentil eaves cornice. and a hipped slate roof. There are two storeys, a front of three bays, two bays on the sides, and a recessed lower one-bay wing on the left. Two steps lead up to an Ionic porch with paired unfluted columns in front of pilasters, an entablature with a reeded frieze and a dentil cornice, and above the door is a rectangular fanlight. The windows are sashes with moulded architraves.	II
Gates and gate piers, Shooter's Hill; 52.82778°N 2.73379°W	—	c. 1830	The gates and gate piers in the drive leading up to the farmhouse are in cast and wrought iron. They are decorative, and consist of a pair of gates with piers of square section, and sections of railings leading to smaller piers.	II
Stable block and coach house, Shooter's Hill; 52.82774°N 2.73259°W	—	c. 1830	The former stable block and coach house are in red brick with an eaves band, a dentil eaves cornice and a hipped slate roof. There are two storeys, and the stable block has three bays. It contains sash windows and a carriage entrance, partly blocked. On the roof is an octagonal wooden cupola with an ogee dome and a weathervane.	II
Harding memorial 52.81181°N 2.72138°W	—	1834	The memorial is in the churchyard of All Saints Church, and is to the memory of members of the Harding family. It is a pedestal tomb in grey sandstone, and has a moulded plinth, panelled pilaster strips, a moulded cornice, and a large urn finial. The memorial is in an enclosure surrounded by wrought iron railings.	II
Stable block and cottage, Sansaw; 52.80417°N 2.72960°W	—	c. 1888	The stable block and cottage are in red brick with brown brick bands and dressings in Grinshill sandstone, and have a hipped slate roof. They have a U-shaped plan and a wall enclosing a courtyard, one storey and a loft, and the cottage has two storeys. On the roof is a central octagonal wooden cupola with a moulded cornice and an ogee lead dome with a weathervane. The cottage has a triangular pedimented gable, a doorway with a moulded arch and a keystone, and a canted bay window.	II
