= Hadnall railway station =

Disused railway station in Shropshire, England

Hadnall
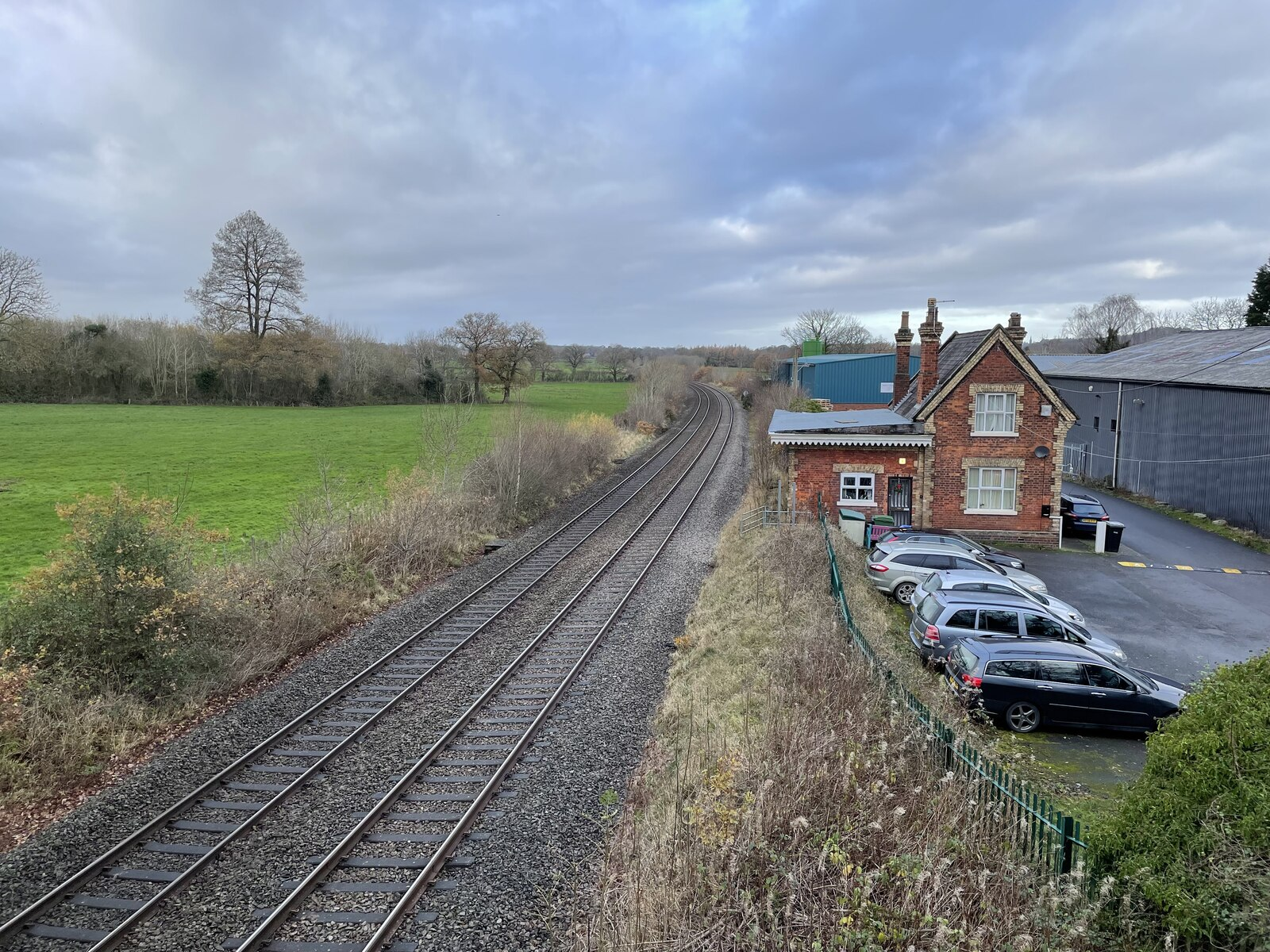

General information
- Location: Hadnall, Shropshire; England
- Coordinates: 52.7738°N 2.7159°W
- Grid reference: SJ518198
- Platforms: 2

Other information
- Status: Disused

History
- Original company: Crewe and Shrewsbury Railway
- Pre-grouping: London and North Western Railway
- Post-grouping: London, Midland and Scottish Railway

Key dates
- 1 September 1858: Opened
- 2 May 1960: Closed
Location

Hadnall railway station was a station in Hadnall, Shropshire, England. The station was opened in 1858 and closed in 1960.

| Preceding station | Disused railways | Following station |
|---|---|---|
| Yorton; Line and station open | London, Midland and Scottish Railway; Crewe and Shrewsbury Railway | Shrewsbury; Line and station open |
