= Fauls Green =

Hamlet in Shropshire, England

Coordinates: 52.890°N 2.609°W

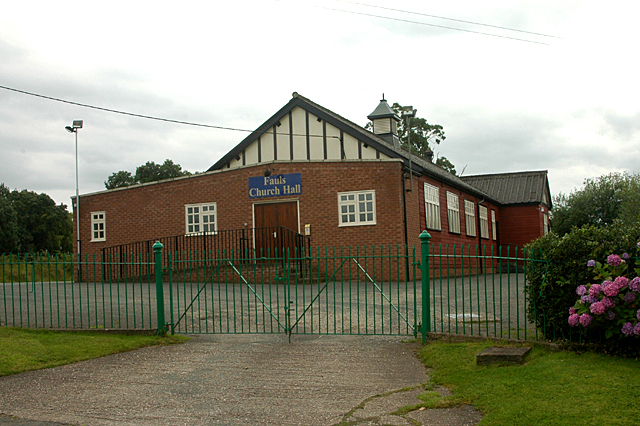
- Fauls Church Hall

- Location within Shropshire
- OS grid reference: SJ590327
- Civil parish: Prees
- Unitary authority: Shropshire
- Ceremonial county: Shropshire
- Region: West Midlands
- Country: England
- Sovereign state: United Kingdom
- Post town: WHITCHURCH
- Postcode district: SY13
- Dialling code: 01948
- Police: West Mercia
- Fire: Shropshire
- Ambulance: West Midlands
- UK Parliament: North Shropshire

Fauls Green (or Faulsgreen) is a hamlet situated 3 miles (4.8 km) from Prees (and lies in that parish) in rural north Shropshire, England. The placename is commonly abbreviated to Fauls.

The Fauls Holy Emmanuel church is located within the hamlet.

Thomas Oakley (1879–1936), the electrician and Conservative politician, was brought up in Fauls.

== See also ==
- Listed buildings in Prees
