= Listed buildings in Prees =

Prees is a civil parish in Shropshire, England. It contains 63 listed buildings that are recorded in the National Heritage List for England. Of these, one is listed at Grade II*, the middle of the three grades, and the others are at Grade II, the lowest grade. The parish contains the village of Prees, the larger settlement of Prees Higher Heath and smaller settlements including Fauls Green, but is otherwise rural. Most of the listed buildings are houses, cottages, farmhouses and farm buildings, many of which are timber framed or have timber-framed cores, and some of the earliest have cruck construction. Various structures associated with these buildings are also listed. The other listed buildings include two churches, items in the churchyard of the older church, a former watermill, and two milestones and a milepost.

== Key ==
Grade	Criteria
II*	Particularly important buildings of more than special interest
II	Buildings of national importance and special interest

== Buildings ==
Name and location	Photograph	Date	Notes	Grade
St Chad's Church; 52.89672°N 2.66004°W		Late 14th century	The porch was added in the 15th century, the tower dates from 1758, and the church was restored in 1863–64 by Ewan Christian when the chancel was largely rebuilt. The church is built in buff and red sandstone with a tile roof, and consists of a nave and a chancel in one cell, a north aisle and chapel, a north porch, and a northwest tower. The tower has three stages, a clock face, a moulded cornice with gargoyles, and an embattled parapet with crocketed corner pinnacles and weathervanes. The porch has a stepped gable, diagonal buttresses, a moulded cornice, and empty niches. The west window of the nave is vesica-shaped, and the east window has three lights and a pointed head.	II*
Providence Grove; 52.89612°N 2.66578°W		15th century	The house was partly remodelled in the late 16th or early 17th century, and was altered later. It is timber framed with rendered wattle and daub infill on a rendered plinth, and has a tile roof. The house is at right angles to the street, it has two storeys and an attic, and the right gable end has a jettied attic with a moulded bressumer. The windows are casements, and above the doorway is a gabled hood.	II
Tudor House; 52.89786°N 2.66554°W		15th century	The house, which was remodelled and extended in the 17th and the 19th centuries, is timber framed with infill and extensions in brick, and has a tile roof. The house originated as an open hall with two wide bays, a projecting cross-wing was later added to the right, and in the 19th century another cross-wing was added to the left; this is in brick, painted to resemble timber framing, and has a hipped roof. There are two storeys, the older cross-wing also has an attic, and the windows are a mix of casements and sashes.	II
Moat House; 52.89067°N 2.61601°W	—	Late 16th century	A farmhouse, later a private house, it is timber framed with rendered infill on a rendered plinth, and has a tile roof. There is one storey and an attic, and the house consists of a hall range of two unequal bays, and a slightly later two-bay cross-wing projecting to the right. On the hall range is a gabled and jettied full dormer. The other windows vary; some are mullioned, some are mullioned and transomed, there is another dormer at the rear, and a French window. On the front and the rear are gabled porches. The house stands on a moated site; the moat is now dry.	II
Fernyleas; 52.90056°N 2.67917°W	—	c. 1600	The farmhouse, which has been altered and extended, is timber framed with brick infill on a plinth, and has roofs of tile and slate. There are two storeys and attics, and the farmhouse consists of a two-bay main range, and three gabled wings at the rear. In the centre is a doorway with a gabled hood, the windows are casements, and there are gabled dormers.	II
17 Moreton Street; 52.90140°N 2.65799°W	—	Early 17th century	A timber framed cottage with brick infill, the left gable end partly rebuilt in brick and painted to resemble timber framing. and a thatched roof. There is one storey and an attic, and three bays. The windows are casements.	II
1 Shrewsbury Street; 52.89745°N 2.66533°W		Early 17th century	A timber framed house with brick infill, a rendered ground floor, and a slate roof. There are two storeys and an attic, a three-bay front, a short rear range, and a later brick extension on the right. In the centre is a two-storey gabled porch, to its left is a shop front, and the windows are casements.	II
2 Shrewsbury Street; 52.89739°N 2.66554°W	—	Early 17th century	The house is timber framed, the front was encased or rebuilt in red brick in the 18th century, it has a dentilled eaves cornice, and a tile roof. There is one storey and an attic, and three bays. The doorway has pilasters, the windows are casements, some with segmental heads, and there are three tile-hung gabled eaves dormers.	II
Bainton Cottages; 52.89586°N 2.62154°W	—	Early 17th century	A farmhouse, later a private house, it is timber framed with brick infill, and has a tile roof. There is an L-shaped plan, consisting of a hall range with one storey and an attic and 2½ bays, and a gabled two-storey cross-wing protruding to the left. The upper floor of the cross-wing is jettied with a moulded bressumer. The windows are casements, and there are gabled eaves dormers.	II
Manor House; 52.89703°N 2.65902°W	—	Early 17th century	A farmhouse, later divided into two dwellings, it is timber framed on a plinth of sandstone and brick, with infill and extensions in red brick, and it has an asbestos slate roof. There is one storey and attics, three bays, and a later two-storey gabled extension at the rear and a lean-to. The windows are casements, there are gabled eaves dormers, and two doorways with bracketed pedimented hoods.	II
The Old Hall; 52.89757°N 2.66051°W	—	Early 17th century	A farmhouse, later a private house, it was partly remodelled in about 1782. The house is timber framed, the left gable is rendered, the front has been replaced in red brick and has a floor band and a dentilled eaves cornice, and the roof is tiled. There are two storeys and an attic, and two bays. The windows are casements with segmental heads, the doorway in the left gable end has a rectangular fanlight and a bracketed open pediment, and above it is a round-headed window.	II
The Old House; 52.90230°N 2.62358°W	—	Early 17th century	A cottage with a house added in the 19th century, at one time an inn, later one house. The original part is timber framed with infill and rebuilding in brick, and a tile roof with bargeboards and pointed finials. There is one storey and an attic, two bays, one sash window and one casement window, and a mounting block on the front. The later part is recessed to the right, it is in red brick painted to resemble timber framing, and has a slate roof. There are two storeys, three bays, and sash windows.	II
Barn north of Tudor House; 52.89811°N 2.66549°W	—	Early 17th century	The barn is timber framed with weatherboarding and corrugated iron cladding, partly rebuilt in red brick, and with a tile roof. There are two levels, and it contains fixed-light windows, an eaves hatch, and three stable doors.	II
The Cottage, Prees; 52.89676°N 2.66189°W	—	1637	A farmhouse that was extended, later a private house, it is timber framed, rendered and painted to resemble timber framing, the extensions are in painted brick, and it has a tile roof with a crow-stepped gable. There is a T-shaped plan, consisting of a short hall wing with one storey and an attic, and a two-storey gabled cross-wing on the left. At the rear is a later extension, and there are single-storey outbuildings attached to the right. The front gable of the cross-wing is slightly jettied, and has a bressumer with rosettes, and a trellised gabled porch. Some windows are casements, others are sashes, and there is a gabled eaves dormer.	II
Aldersey Farmhouse; 52.88534°N 2.66985°W	—	17th century (probable)	The farmhouse has been extended and partly rebuilt. It is in roughcast timber framing, the front has been rebuilt in red brick, and it has a tile roof. There is one storey and an attic, with a two-bay front range, a gabled rear wing, and a later extension to the right. On the front is a gabled porch and a round-headed doorway. The windows are casements, those in the ground floor with segmental heads in engineering brick, and there are gabled eaves dormers.	II
Laburnum Cottage; 52.89382°N 2.62925°W	—	Mid 17th century	A farmhouse, later a private house, that was later extended. It is timber framed with rendered infill on a rendered plinth, and has a tile roof. There is one storey and an attic, the windows are casements, and there are three gabled eaves dormers. On the front are two open gabled porches with carved balusters.	II
Rookery Cottage; 52.89199°N 2.63499°W	—	Mid 17th century	A farmhouse, later a private house, it is timber framed with brick infill and some rebuilding in brick, and it has a corrugated iron roof. There is one storey and an attic, and three bays. The cottage has three casement windows, raking eaves dormers, and two doorways.	II
Shropshire House; 52.89701°N 2.66560°W	—	17th century	A timber framed house that was clad in red brick on the front and rendered elsewhere in the 18th century. It has a dentilled eaves cornice and a slate roof. There are two storeys and attics, and three bays. The windows are casements with segmental heads, there are three gabled eaves dormers, and two doorways with pilasters.	II
Wood Bank; 52.89603°N 2.65653°W	—	17th century	The cottage was extended in the 20th century. The original part is timber framed and pebbledashed on a rendered plinth, the extension is in red brick, and the roof is tiled. There is one storey and an attic, the original part has two bays, and to the left is a gabled extension. The windows are casements, and there is a gabled dormer.	II
Hazelwood Farmhouse; 52.89661°N 2.62368°W	—	1655	The farmhouse was remodelled in the 18th century and later extended. It is roughcast over brick at the front and timber framing at the rear, and has a tile roof. There are two storeys and an attic, with a floor band and a dentilled eaves cornice at the front. The farmhouse has a T-shaped plan, consisting of a three-bay range and an earlier range at the rear; the upper floor of the rear range is jettied. The windows are mullioned and transomed casements, and there is a lean-to porch in the angle between the ranges.	II
2 Sandford; 52.90205°N 2.62271°W	—	Mid to late 17th century	The cottage, which was later extended, is timber framed with infill and extensions in red brick, and a slate roof. There is one storey and an attic, and two bays, later extended to the right. The windows are casements, and there are two gabled eaves dormers.	II
Barn south of Chapel Cottage; 52.87908°N 2.65474°W	—	Mid to late 17th century	The barn is timber framed with brick infill, corrugated iron cladding at the rear, and a corrugated iron roof. There are two levels, and the barn contains doorways and infilled windows.	II
14–16 Whitchurch Road; 52.89882°N 2.66513°W	—	Late 17th century	A farmhouse, later divided into three cottages, it is timber framed, with the timber framing replaced by red brick on the front and right gable end, the left gable end rendered, and exposed at the rear. There is one storey and attics, and three bays. The windows are casements with segmental heads, and there are three gabled eaves dormers.	II
Outbuilding northwest of Cedars; 52.89690°N 2.62399°W	—	Late 17th century	The outbuilding is timber framed with red brick infill and has a tile roof. There is one storey and two bays, and it contains a doorway and fixed windows.	II
Barn southwest of Fernyleas; 52.90044°N 2.67975°W	—	Late 17th century	The barn is timber framed and clad in iron sheeting, and has a corrugated iron roof. There are double doors on the north side.	II
Barns southeast of Hazelwood Farmhouse; 52.89633°N 2.62333°W	—	Late 17th century	Three barns forming an L-shaped plan on the north and east sides of the farmyard, they are timber framed with red brick infill, weatherboarding, and corrugated iron cladding, and have roofs of corrugated iron and tile. They have two levels and contain double doors, stable doors, and eaves hatches.	II
Keeper's Cottage; 52.89061°N 2.61421°W	—	Late 17th century	The cottage is timber framed with red brick infill, there is some rebuilding in yellow brick, and it has a corrugated iron roof. There is one storey and an attic, and two bays. In the centre is a doorway, which is flanked by casement windows, and there is a gabled eaves dormer at the rear.	II
The Dell; 52.89512°N 2.66557°W	—	Late 17th century	Originally a toll house, the cottage is timber framed and pebbledashed on a rendered plinth, and has a slate roof. There is one storey and an attic, and two bays. Most of the windows are casements, and there is a gabled eaves dormer.	II
Barn east of Wood Bank; 52.89606°N 2.65624°W	—	Late 17th century	The barn is timber framed, it is clad in corrugated iron, and has a slate roof. There are two levels, and it contains double doors.	II
Yew Tree Cottage, Darliston; 52.89719°N 2.62414°W	—	Late 17th century	The cottage, which was later extended, is timber framed with brick infill, extensions in brick, and a tile roof. There are two storeys and three bays. The windows are casements, and there are two gabled porches.	II
Sandford Hall; 52.90375°N 2.62402°W	—	c. 1700	A small country house that was extended in the 19th century, it is in red brick with chamfered quoins, a moulded floor band, an eaves cornice, and a hipped slate roof. There are two storeys and an attic, five bays, the middle bay projecting with a third storey and a segmental pediment, and later extensions to the right and at the rear. In the centre is a doorway with pilasters, a rectangular fanlight, and an open pediment on carved consoles. The windows are sashes with keystones, and there are two hip roofed dormers.	II
Bank Farmhouse; 52.89952°N 2.64918°W	—	1714	The farmhouse is in pebbledashed brick with quoins, floor bands, and a hipped tile roof. There are two storeys and an attic, two bays, a lower two-storey range at the rear, and further extensions. In the centre is a gabled porch, the windows are casements with wedge lintels and projecting keystones, and there are two hip roofed dormers.	II
Prees Hall; 52.89753°N 2.66114°W	—	c. 1720	A country house incorporating earlier material. It is in red brick on a timber framed core, with a moulded eaves cornice, a hipped tile roof, and two storeys. The main block has seven bays, the middle three bays recessed under a pediment with giant Doric pilasters. In the centre is a doorway with a moulded surround. On each side of the main block is a single-bay link leading to a pavilion, each with one bay and a pyramidal roof. The windows are sashes, and in the east pavilion is a canted bay window.	II
Stable block and wall, Prees Hall; 52.89760°N 2.66142°W	—	Early 18th century	The former stable block is in red brick with a dentilled eaves cornice and a hipped tile roof. There is one storey and an attic, and the building contains a wide elliptical arch with a fixed window and a stepped gable above. To the left is a red brick wall with sandstone coping. It is about 40 metres (130 ft) long, and has pilaster]s and a chamfered plinth on the north side.	II
Stables northeast of Sandford Hall; 52.90398°N 2.62373°W	—	Early 18th century	The stables, which were partly rebuilt in 1860, are in red brick with dentilled eaves cornices and hipped tile roofs. They have two levels and form two ranges at right angles on the north and east sides of the courtyard. In the centre of the north range is a round-headed arch with three recessed round-headed windows above, a pedimented gable, a datestone, and a coat of arms. On the roof is a clock and a gabled bellcote. In the east range are two elliptical-headed vehicle entrances and sash windows.	II
Yew Tree Cottage, Prees Lower Heath; 52.89366°N 2.63268°W	—	Early 18th century (probable)	Two cottages, later combined into one, it is timber framed with infill and rebuilding in red brick, and a thatched roof. There is one storey and an attic, most of the windows are casements, there is one fixed window and a raking eaves dormer. Inside is an inglenook fireplace.	II
Barn northeast of Yew Tree Cottage; 52.89377°N 2.63249°W	—	Early 18th century (probable)	The barn is timber framed with weatherboarding and a corrugated iron roof. There are two levels, two bays, a loft over the right bay, and the barn contains plank doors.	II
Moreton Farmhouse; 52.90323°N 2.65564°W	—	Early to mid 18th century	The farmhouse is in red brick with a tile roof. There are two storeys and attics, and an L-shaped plan consisting of a main range of three bays, and a rear range on the left. The windows are mullioned and transomed casements, and in the rear angle is a gabled porch.	II
Sandylane Farmhouse and wall 52.88394°N 2.66128°W	—	Early to mid 18th century	The farmhouse is in red brick with pilasters, a dentilled eaves cornice, and a tile roof with crow-stepped gables. It has a T-shaped plan, with a main range of two storeys and three bays, a possibly earlier rear range with one storey and an attic, and lean-tos in the angles. In the centre is a doorway with pilasters, and the windows are casements. Attached to the left of the farmhouse is a red brick wall with sandstone coping.	II
Sandford Mill; 52.90257°N 2.62471°W	—	Mid 18th century	The former watermill is in red brick with floor bands, a tile roof, and has two levels. There are two segmental-headed doorways, a square-headed window, and a square-headed doorway leading to the waterwheel. Inside is a massive undershot wheel and a small cast iron grinding sheel.	II
The Brades Farmhouse and wall 52.89144°N 2.67198°W	—	Mid 18th century	The farmhouse is in red brick with a tile roof. There are two storeys and an attic, three bays, a gabled range at the rear, and an outshut in the angle. In the centre of the front is a brick porch, and the windows are mullioned and transomed casements with segmental heads. Attached to the right corner of the farmhouse is a red brick wall with sandstone coping.	II
The Cottage, Steel Heath; 52.92375°N 2.68530°W	—	18th century (or later)	Originally a squatter's cottage, it is timber framed with brick infill and a corrugated iron roof. The cottage has a single storey with an attic at one end, and contains two casement windows and an eyebrow dormer. Inside is a surviving fire-hood.	II
Moreton Cottage; 52.89862°N 2.65969°W	—	1759	The cottage is in red brick with a dentilled eaves cornice and a tile roof. There is one storey and an attic. The doorway and casement windows have segmental heads, and there is a gabled eaves dormer. On the front is an oval datestone.	II
Font; 52.89680°N 2.66009°W	—	1762	The font is in the churchyard of St Chad's Church to the east of the north porch. It is in sandstone and is in Norman style. The font consists of a circular scalloped bowl on a moulded plinth with a rectangular base, and there is an inscription around the rim of the bowl.	II
Wall and gate piers, Sandford Hall; 52.90372°N 2.62383°W	—	Mid to late 18th century	The wall forms the boundary to the south and east of the stable yard, and is in red brick with sandstone coping. The gate piers on the south are rusticated and have stone capping and ball finials. The pier at the northeast corner is plain, and has a pyramidal cap and an urn finial.	II
Wood Farmhouse; 52.89484°N 2.64327°W	—	Mid to late 18th century	The farmhouse is in red brick with floor bands and a slate roof. There is an L-shaped plan, consisting of a main range with two storeys and an attic, and four bays, and a service range at the rear on the right with two storeys. The windows are casements with segmental heads, and the entrance has a gabled timber porch.	II
Former lock-up 52.89711°N 2.66513°W	—	Late 18th century	The former lock-up has a square plan, it is in sandstone, and the roof consists of a flat slab with a moulded cornice and a central ball terminal. On the north side are double doors in corrugated iron.	II
Walford House; 52.89649°N 2.66568°W	—	Late 18th century	A red brick house on a sandstone plinth, with a moulded eaves cornice, and a slate roof. There are three storeys and a symmetrical front of three bays. In the centre is a round-headed doorway with a semicircular fanlight, and there is a similar doorway in the right return. The windows are sashes with stone wedge lintels.	II
26 Shrewsbury Street; 52.89640°N 2.66563°W	—	c. 1800	A red brick house with a tile roof, two storeys and two bays. The doorway to the left has pilasters, and the windows are sashes.	II
Stone building west of lock-up 52.89714°N 2.66533°W	—	Late 18th or early 19th century	The purpose of the building is unknown, it is in sandstone, and has a slate roof with gabled ends and a projecting eaves course. There are two storeys, one bay, and a rear lean-to. The windows and doorways have plain surrounds.	II
Sundial; 52.89658°N 2.66000°W	—	1824	The sundial is in the churchyard of St Chad's Church. It is in sandstone, and consists of a vase-shaped baluster with plain moulded capping and a plinth on a square base. There is an inscription round the capping. On the top are a brass dial and a gnomon, also inscribed.	II
1A Shrewsbury Street; 52.89734°N 2.66536°W	—	Early 19th century	A house, later a shop, it is in red brick with a dentilled eaves cornice and a tile roof. There are two storeys and three bays. The central doorway has a rectangular fanlight, and is flanked by shop windows. In the upper floor are casement windows, the middle window being blind; the doorway and all the windows have keystones.	II
9 Whitchurch Road; 52.89807°N 2.66527°W	—	Early 19th century	A red brick house with a dentilled eaves cornice and a slate roof. There are three storeys, three bays, a two-storey gabled extension recessed to the left, and further extensions to the rear. In the centre is a doorway with pilasters and a semicircular fanlight, and the windows are sashes with grooved lintels and keystones.	II
Croydon House and railings 52.89660°N 2.66568°W	—	Early 19th century	The house is in painted brick with a dentilled eaves cornice, and a tile roof. There are two storeys and three bays. On the front is a stuccoed porch with Tuscan columns and a moulded entablature, and the windows are sashes. Attached to the front of the house are railings on a sandstone plinth.	II
Fairview and railings 52.89718°N 2.66029°W	—	Early 19th century	A painted brick house probably incorporating earlier material, it has a dentilled eaves cornice, and a tile roof. There are two storeys, three bays, and a full-length two-storey lean-to at the rear. The windows are sashes, and the doorway has a pediment. Attached to the front of the house is a low sandstone wall with railings.	II
Milestone at N.G.R. S.J. 5829 3402; 52.90183°N 2.62128°W	—	Early 19th century	The milestone was provided for the London to Chester turnpike road and is on the south side of the A41 road. It is in sandstone, and has a rounded top and a rectangular cast iron plate. The stone is inscribed "Sandford", and the plate indicates the distances in miles to London and to Chester.	II
Milestone at N.G.R. S.J. 5982 3378; 52.90007°N 2.59883°W	—	Early 19th century	The milestone was provided for the London to Chester turnpike road and is on the south side of the A41 road. It is in sandstone, and has a rounded top and a rectangular cast iron plate. The inscription is illegible.	II
Holy Immanuel Church; 52.89020°N 2.61106°W		1856	The church was designed by Benjamin Ferrey, the north transept was added in 1898, and the south vestry was extended in about 1904. The church is built in red brick, and has bands of blue engineering brick, stone dressings, and tile roofs. It consists of a nave and a chancel in one cell, north and south transepts, and a south porch. At the west end are two lancet windows and a rose window, and on the gable is a gabled bellcote.	II
Milepost at N.G.R. SJ 5545 3298; 52.89254°N 2.66358°W	—	Late 19th century	The milepost is on the east side of Shrewsbury Street. It is in cast iron and has a triangular section, hollowed at the back, and with a chamfered top. The milepost is inscribed with the distances in miles to "SALOP" (Shrewsbury} and to Whitchurch.	II
Dovecote north of Sandford Hall; 52.90438°N 2.62411°W	—	Late 19th century (probable)	The dovecote, which has an octagonal plan, is in rendering painted to resemble timber framing on a red brick plinth, It has an octagonal slate roof with a central pyramidal- capped louvre, and gabled eaves dormers with pointed finials and carved pendants. The dovecote contains square-headed windows and a doorway.	II
Sluice Gate, Sandford Pool; 52.90240°N 2.62553°W	—	Late 19th century	The sluice gate is in sandstone, and has twin narrow round-headed arches with keystones, a string course and a parapet on the south side, and the sluice equipment is on the north side.	II
Wash house 52.89368°N 2.63283°W	—	Late 19th century (probable)	The wash house is to the west of Yew Tree Cottage. It is in red brick with a tile roof, and has one level. There is a cast iron latticed window on each side, and a doorway in the right gable end.	II
Pump and basin south of Yew Tree Cottage; 52.89362°N 2.63271°W	—	Undated	The pump is in cast iron. It has a shaft with the maker's emblem, a fluted top with a dome-shaped cap and a pointed finial, a decorated spout, and a slightly curved handle. The basin is rectangular and in stone.	II
