= Listed buildings in Grinshill =

Grinshill is a civil parish in Shropshire, England. It contains 20 listed buildings that are recorded in the National Heritage List for England. Of these, one is at Grade II*, the middle of the three grades, and the others are at Grade II, the lowest grade. The parish contains the village of Grinshill and the surrounding countryside. To the north of the village is a former quarry that produced sandstone described as "the finest building stone in Shropshire". This is used in the construction of many of the buildings in the village and elsewhere in the county. Most of the listed buildings are houses and associated structures, farmhouses and farm buildings, and the other listed buildings consist of a church, and items in and around the churchyard,

== Key ==
Grade	Criteria
II*	Particularly important buildings of more than special interest
II	Buildings of national importance and special interest

== Buildings ==
Name and location	Photograph	Date	Notes	Grade
Bronhaul; 52.80633°N 2.71065°W	—	15th century (probable)	The house originated as a timber framed hall house with cruck construction. It was encased in brick in 1771, and has a chamfered plinth in Grinshill sandstone, a dentil eaves cornice, and a tile roof. There are two storeys and an attic, three bays, and a lower kitchen wing to the right. The central doorway is approached by steps and has a three-light fanlight and a moulded architrave. Above the doorway is a Venetian window and a datestone, and the other windows are cross-windows with segmental heads. Inside is a full cruck truss.	II
Stone Grange; 52.80594°N 2.70569°W	—	1616–23	Originally built for Shrewsbury School, later a private house, it is in Grinshill sandstone on a chamfered plinth, with a moulded string course, and a tile roof with parapeted and coped gables. There are two storeys, an attic and cellar, and a front of five bays. The windows are mullioned and transomed. On the front are two 19th-century porches, each with Doric pilaster strips, a frieze, a cornice, a parapet embattled on the sides, with globe finials and a stepped raised centre and a gabled top.	II*
The Manor House; 52.80629°N 2.71278°W		Early 17th century	A vicarage, later a private house, it was extended in the 19th century. The house is mainly in Grinshill sandstone, and has a timber framed rear wing with brick nogging on a sandstone plinth. The roof is tiled with coped parapeted gables, and there are two storeys and attics. On the front are two bays with wide gables, between which is a gabled two-storey porch with a segmental arch, and to the left is a two-storey single-bay extension. The windows are mullioned and transomed, and on the front is a painted sundial with a wrought iron gnomon.	II
Barleycorn Cottage and farm buildings 52.80578°N 2.71046°W	—	Early to mid 17th century	A house, later divided, it was extended in about 1700 and altered in the 20th century. The building is timber framed with brick nogging on a brick plinth with a tile roof, and the farm buildings have been partly rebuilt in brick. There is one storey and an attic, and a T-shaped plan with a range of three bays, and a later cross-wing to the east. The gables are jettied with carved bressumers. Most windows are casements, and there are gabled eaves dormers.	II
Step House; 52.80640°N 2.71191°W	—	Early to mid 17th century	The house is timber framed with brick nogging, partly rebuilt in red sandstone, and with a slate roof. There are two storeys, three bays, a one-storey lean-to and a one-storey wing at the rear. On the front is a small gabled porch, the windows are casements, and in the upper floor are two oriel windows on brackets.	II
Garden wall, gate and gate piers, The Manor House; 52.80622°N 2.71273°W	—	1694	The wall at the front of the garden was extended and the gateway was added in about 1820. The wall is in grey sandstone, partly with chamfered coping, and is about 30 metres (98 ft) long and 1 metre (3 ft 3 in) high. In the centre is a gateway that has square cast iron piers with fluted plinths and pyramidal caps, and the gates are in wrought iron.	II
Key memorial 52.80672°N 2.71283°W		1699	The memorial is in the churchyard of All Saints Church, and is to the memory of William Key. It is a rectangular chest tomb in Grinshill sandstone. The tomb has a large pulvinated frieze, deep moulded cornice, and an inscribed top slab.	II
Former font 52.80665°N 2.71276°W	—	c. 1700	The former font is in the churchyard of All Saints Church. It is in grey sandstone with a circular plan, and consists of a narrow stem and a large fluted bowl.	II
Higher House; 52.80702°N 2.71247°W	—	Early 18th century	The house was extended in the 19th century. The original part is in brick on a moulded plinth, with sandstone dressings, rusticated quoins, a band, and a moulded dentil eaves cornice. The extension is faced in grey sandstone, and the roof is tiled with parapeted and coped gables, and is hipped over the extension. There are two storeys and an attic, the main block has three bays, and the extension is recessed to the left with three bays. The middle bay of the main block projects slightly and has a triangular pedimented gable containing an oeil-de-boeuf window in the tympanum. The central doorway has a moulded architrave with a triple keystone, and a flat hood. The windows are sashes, and in the extension are sash and casement windows.	II
Mount Pleasant or The Hill; 52.81096°N 2.71010°W	—	Early 18th century	A former quarryman's cottage that was extended and altered in the 19th century. It is in Grinshill sandstone with a gable end rebuilt in brick and a tile roof. There is one storey and an attic, one bay, a lean-to on the front, and an extension recessed to the left. The windows are casements, and the doorway has a keyed lintel.	II
The Well House and The Elephant and Castle Hotel; 52.80589°N 2.71091°W		Early 18th century	The building is in red brick on a chamfered plinth, with sandstone dressings, quoins, a band, a moulded eaves cornice and a tile roof. There are two storeys, an attic and basement, and a symmetrical front of five bays, the middle bay with a pediment containing an oeil-de-boeuf window. In the centre is a Tuscan porch and a doorway with a moulded architrave. The windows are cross-windows with segmental heads, and keystones. To the right is a recessed wing with two storeys and two bays, and a Doric doorcase.	II
Garden wall, The Well House and The Elephant and Castle Hotel; 52.80576°N 2.71066°W	—	Early 18th century	The garden wall to the southeast of the building is in red brick on a plinth of red sandstone and with grey sandstone coping. It is about 26 metres (85 ft) long and 2 metres (6 ft 7 in) high.	II
Grinshill Hall; 52.80635°N 2.71332°W	—	Early to mid 18th century	The house is in red brick on a chamfered plinth, with dressings in Grinshill sandstone, quoins, a band, a moulded eaves cornice, and a slate roof. The main block has two storeys and an attic, and three bays, and to the left is a two-storey four-bay service wing. In the ground floor are two canted bay windows, the other windows are sashes with chamfered lintels, and triple keystones, and there are three gabled eaves dormers with rusticated surrounds and moulded bargeboards. In the centre is a Tuscan porch and a doorway with a rectangular fanlight.	II
Gate and gate piers, Higher House; 52.80630°N 2.71219°W	—	Early to mid 18th century	The gate piers are in grey sandstone. Each has a square section, panelled sides, a moulded cornice, and a cap with a globe finial. The gates, dating from the 19th century, are in wrought iron.	II
Gazebo and wall, Grinshill Hall; 52.80683°N 2.71371°W	—	Mid 18th century	The gazebo is in red brick with grey sandstone dressings and a hipped tile roof. It has two storeys and is in Gothick style, and is approached by twelve steps in an L-shaped plan. The doorway has a four-centred arch, it is flanked by round-headed windows, and in the upper floor are casement windows with pointed heads and Y-tracery. To the west is a garden wall in red brick with a sandstone base and coping, it has an L-shaped plan, and is about 65 metres (213 ft) long and 2 metres (6 ft 7 in) high.	II
Embrey Memorial; 52.80671°N 2.71271°W	—	1786	The memorial is in the churchyard of All Saints Church, and is to the memory of members of the Embrey family. It is a chest tomb in Grinshill sandstone, and has recessed panels, corner piers, a moulded cornice, and a concave top with a large urn and a fluted finial.	II
Woodstile Farmhouse; 52.80294°N 2.70107°W	—	c. 1800	The farmhouse was later extended and divided. The original part is timber framed with brick nogging on a high grey sandstone plinth, the extensions are in brick painted to resemble timber framing, with a dentil eaves cornice, and the roof is tiled. It has an L-shaped plan, that has a four-bay range with one storey and an attic, and a later wing of three bays and two storeys and an attic. The central doorway has a three-light rectangular fanlight, and a flat bracketed hood with a moulded cornice. On the front the windows are sashes, at the rear they are casements, and there are three gabled half-dormers.	II
Sundial; 52.80668°N 2.71281°W		Late 18th or early 19th century	The sundial is in the churchyard of All Saints Church. It is in grey sandstone and has an octagonal plan. There is a large moulded base, a plain shaft, and a plain top with an inscribed copper dial plate and a gnomon.	II
Churchyard wall and gateway 52.80663°N 2.71259°W	—	1821	The wall on the east side of the churchyard is in grey sandstone with a chamfered top and an extension in red sandstone to the north, and it is about 40 metres (130 ft) long and 1 metre (3 ft 3 in) high. To the south is a gateway that has a pair of tapering red sandstone piers, a wrought iron gate, and a decorative wrought iron overthrow with a finial.	II
All Saints Church; 52.80678°N 2.71286°W		1839–41	The church is in Grinshill sandstone with a slate roof and is in Neo-Norman style. It consists of a nave and chancel in one cell, a lean-to north vestry, and a west tower. The tower has two stages, a clock face on the south side, a corbelled-out parapet and a weathervane. The windows on the sides of the church are round-headed, and the east window is a triple stepped lancet window.	II
