= Grinshill =

Village in Shropshire, England

Coordinates: 52.806°N 2.712°W

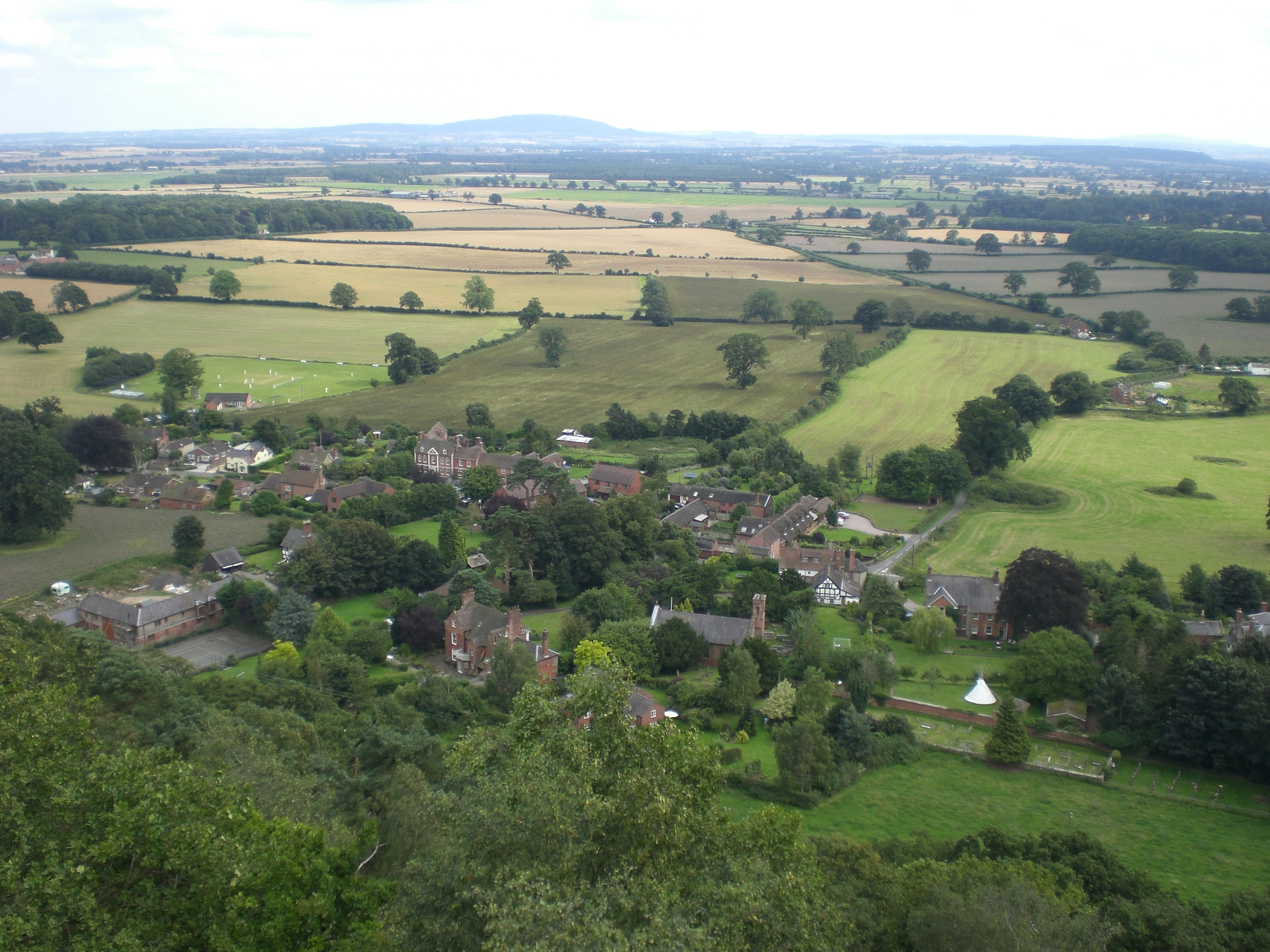
- View over Grinshill from Grinshill Hill

- Location within Shropshire
- Population: 274 (2011)
- OS grid reference: SJ520234
- Civil parish: Grinshill
- Unitary authority: Shropshire
- Ceremonial county: Shropshire
- Region: West Midlands
- Country: England
- Sovereign state: United Kingdom
- Post town: SHREWSBURY
- Postcode district: SY4
- Dialling code: 01939
- Police: West Mercia
- Fire: Shropshire
- Ambulance: West Midlands
- UK Parliament: North Shropshire

Grinshill is a small village, and civil parish in Shropshire, England, United Kingdom. The parish is one of the smallest in the district. The population of the civil parish at the 2011 census was 274. Grinshill Hill rises above the village to 192 metres (630 ft) above sea level.

Grinshill is near (east) to the village of Clive. The A49 runs just further to the east of the village. The nearest railway station is at Yorton, a mile or so to the west.

Stone has been quarried at Grinshill since at least the twelfth century. Grinshill stone is a Triassic sandstone that was described by the Pevsner Architectural Guides as the "pre-eminent" building stone of Shropshire, and has been used in buildings as varied as Haughmond Abbey, Shrewsbury railway station and its Welsh Bridge. Most notably, Grinshill stone has been used to make the lintels and door surround of Number 10 Downing Street and in the building of Chequers.

The village church is All Saints. Nearby is a mansion, Stone Grange, built in 1617 as a retreat for Shrewsbury School in times of plague in the town.

== See also ==
- Listed buildings in Grinshill
