= Wem railway station =

Railway station in Shropshire, England

Coordinates: 52.8564°N 2.718°W

Wem
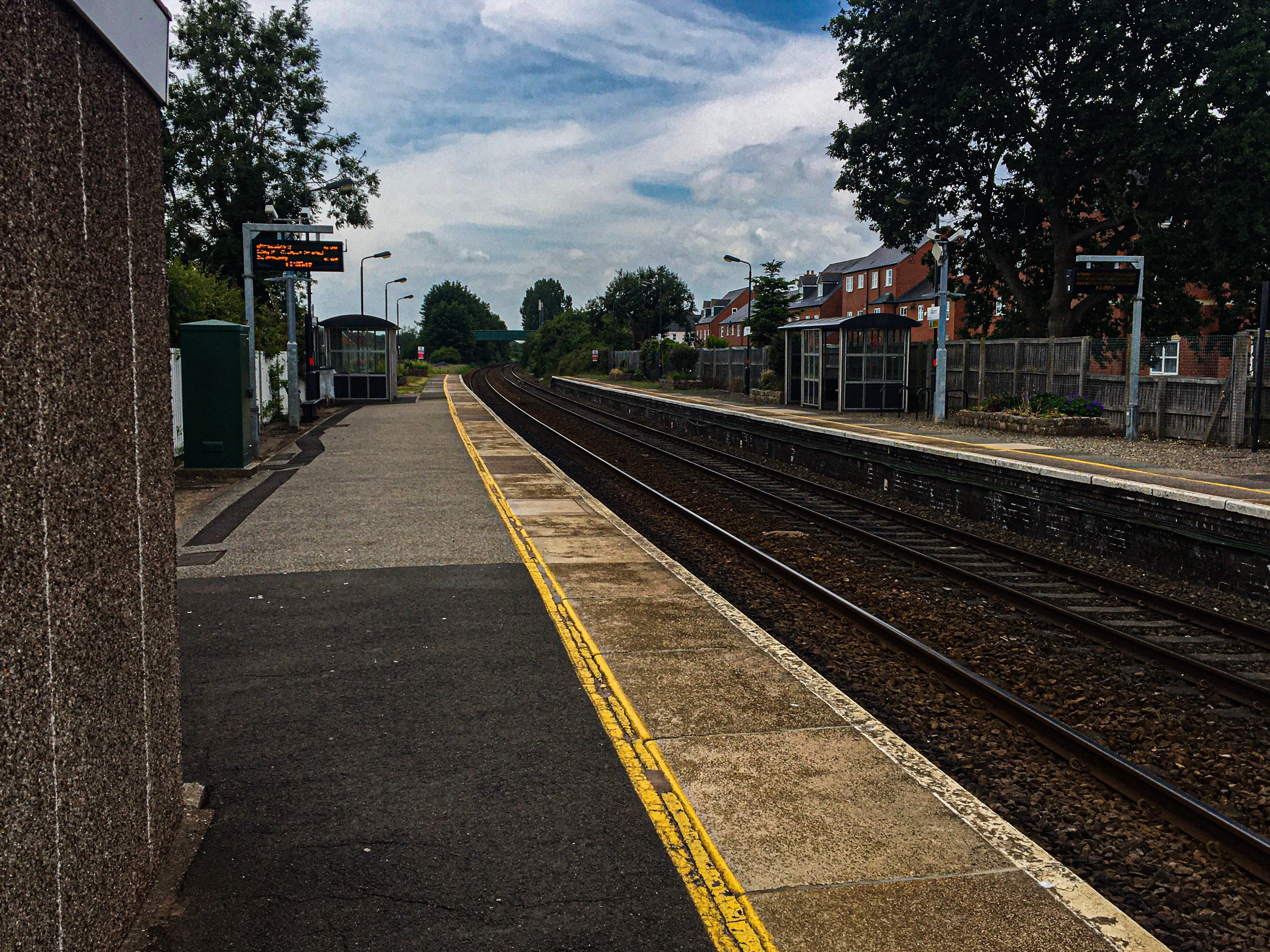
- The station looking towards Shrewsbury

General information
- Location: Wem, Shropshire; England
- Grid reference: SJ517290
- Manager: Transport for Wales
- Platforms: 2

Other information
- Station code: WEM
- Classification: DfT category F1

History
- Opened: 1858

Passengers
- 2020/21: ▼24,242
- 2021/22: ▲74,000
- 2022/23: ▲86,506
- 2023/24: ▲95,654
- 2024/25: ▲0.112 million
Location
Notes
- Passenger statistics from the Office of Rail and Road

Wem railway station serves the town of Wem in Shropshire, England. The station is 10¾ miles (17 km) north of Shrewsbury on the Welsh Marches Line to Crewe.

The station has two platforms. There is a level crossing at the north end of the station. This is now the only way for passengers to cross the line at the station, since the station footbridge was taken down. The level crossing is where Aston Street becomes Aston Road.

Over the weekend of 8–9 August 2015 the signal box which was located next to the level crossing was demolished. The barriers have been controlled remotely from the South Wales ROC at Cardiff since 2013 and the signal box was deemed obsolete.

There is also a small car park, which is accessed from Aston Street.

The signal box's Network Rail designation was "WM".

== Facilities ==
It is unstaffed with a ticket machine on each platform, and no permanent buildings now remain aside from standard shelters on each platform. Train running information is offered via CIS display screens, customer help points and timetable poster boards. Step-free access is available via ramps to both platforms.

== Services ==
Monday to Saturdays there is generally a two-hourly service from Wem southbound to Shrewsbury and northbound to Crewe (although a few longer distance services also call) with nine trains southbound and eight northbound on Sundays.

A survey in the four weeks to 1 February 2025 by the Office of Rail and Road found that of 813 services scheduled for the station during that period, 1.72 per cent were cancelled - the lowest percentage of cancellations of any of the stations in Shropshire.

Preceding station	National Rail	Following station
Yorton	Transport for Wales; Welsh Marches Line	Prees
