= Ynys Tachwedd =

Village in Ceredigion, Wales

Coordinates: 52.518529°N 4.040662°W

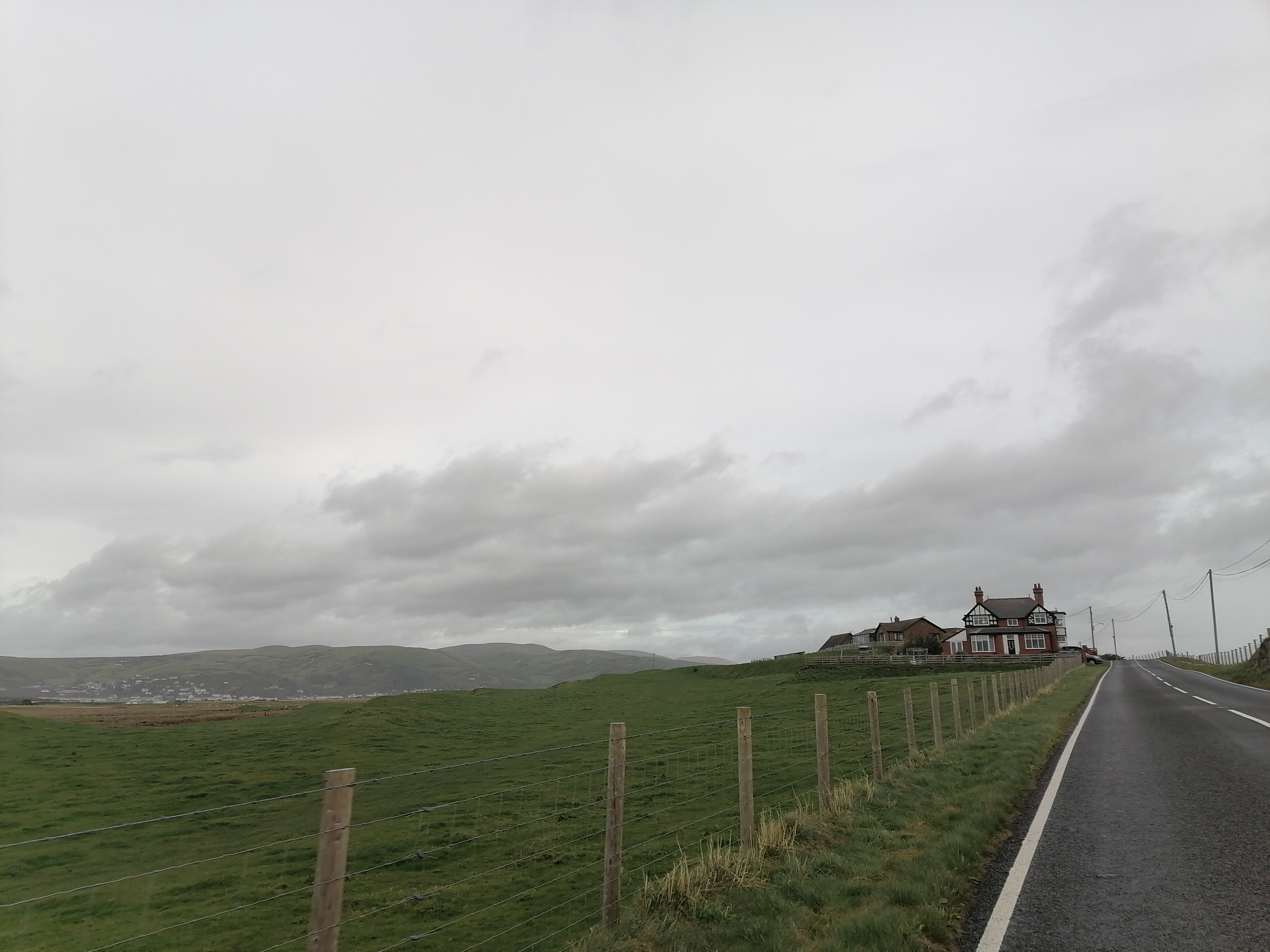
- View along the B4353 road

- Location within Ceredigion
- OS grid reference: SN 6163 9314
  - Cardiff: 80.5 mi (129.6 km)
  - London: 180.5 mi (290.5 km)
- Community: Borth
- Principal area: Ceredigion
- Country: Wales
- Sovereign state: United Kingdom
- Post town: Borth
- Postcode district: SY24
- Police: Dyfed-Powys
- Fire: Mid and West Wales
- Ambulance: Welsh
- UK Parliament: Ceredigion Preseli
- Senedd Cymru – Welsh Parliament: Ceredigion

Ynys Tachwedd is a hamlet in the community of Borth, Ceredigion, Wales, which is 80.5 miles (129.6 km) from Cardiff and 180.5 miles (290.5 km) from London. Ynys Tachwedd is represented in the Senedd by Elin Jones (Plaid Cymru) and is part of the Ceredigion Preseli constituency in the House of Commons.

== Etymology ==
The name derives from the Welsh language: "November's island".

== See also ==
- List of localities in Wales by population
