= Yearngill =

Hamlet in Cumbria, England

Coordinates: 54.783°N 3.338°W

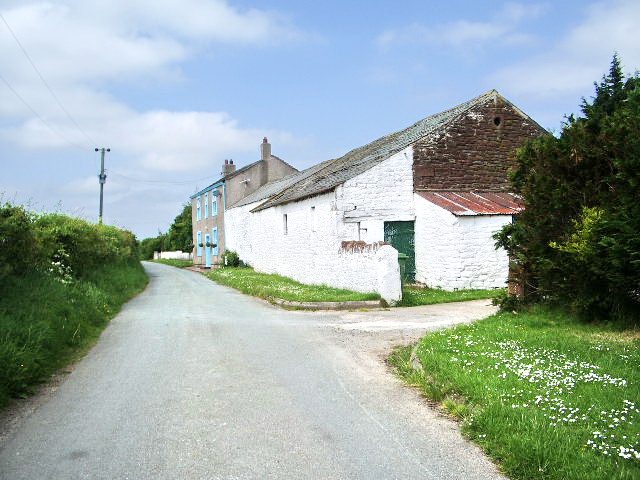
- Barn at Yearngill

- Location in Allerdale, Cumbria Location within Cumbria
- OS grid reference: NY139440
- Civil parish: Westnewton
- Unitary authority: Cumberland
- Ceremonial county: Cumbria
- Region: North West
- Country: England
- Sovereign state: United Kingdom
- Post town: WIGTON
- Postcode district: CA7
- Dialling code: 016973
- Police: Cumbria
- Fire: Cumbria
- Ambulance: North West
- UK Parliament: Penrith and Solway

Yearngill is a small former farming hamlet, surrounded by countryside & with rolling hills, located in the English county of Cumbria.

Yearngill is located less than a mile southeast of the village of Westnewton. It is also located near the Civil Parish of Aspatria.
