= Yopps Green =

Hamlet in Kent, England

Coordinates: 51.2622°N 0.2951°E

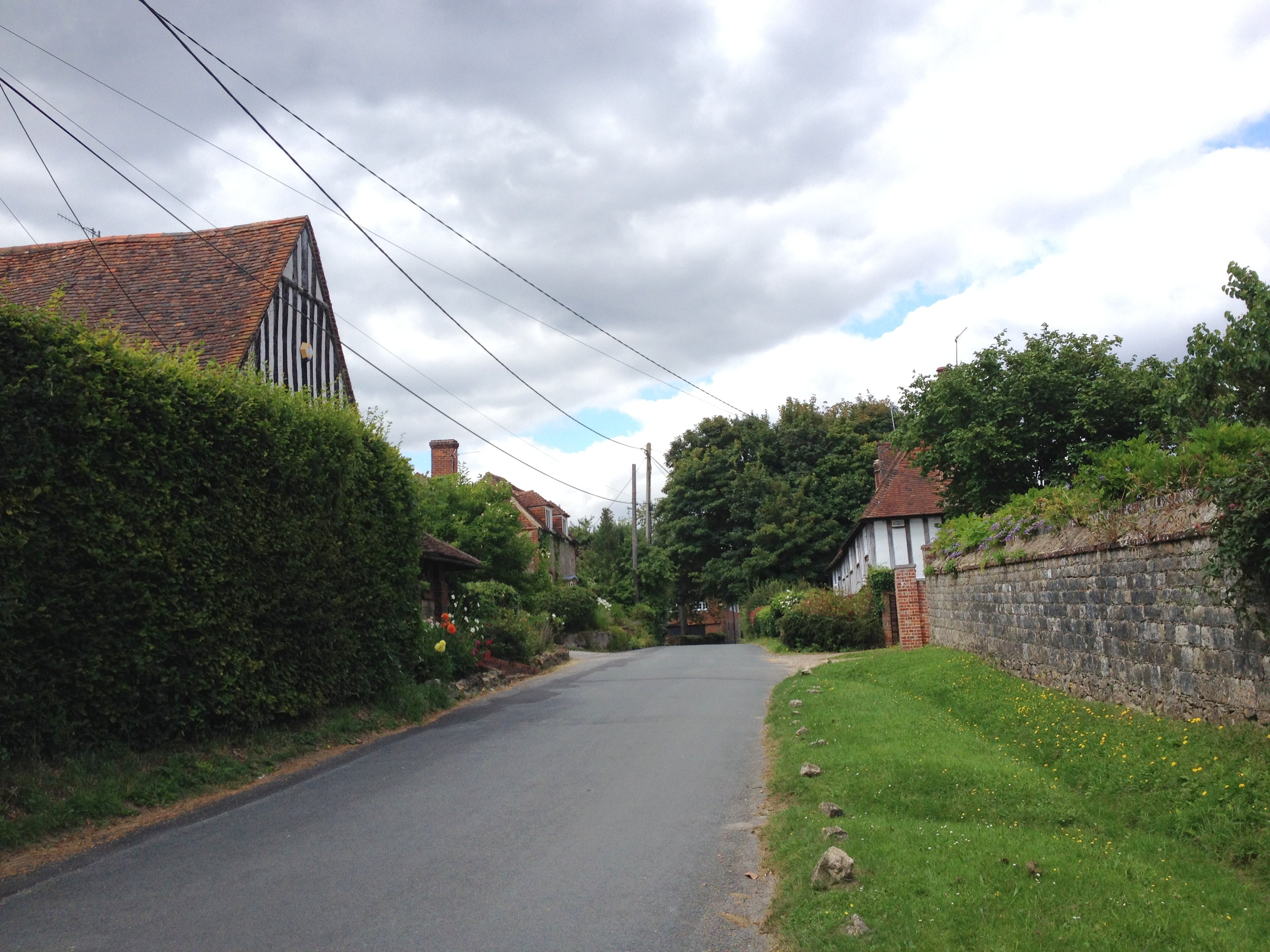
- Yopps Green

- Location within Kent
- Civil parish: Plaxtol
- District: Tonbridge and Malling
- Shire county: Kent
- Region: South East
- Country: England
- Sovereign state: United Kingdom
- Post town: Sevenoaks
- Postcode district: TN15
- Police: Kent
- Fire: Kent
- Ambulance: South East Coast
- UK Parliament: Tonbridge and Malling

Yopps Green is a hamlet in the Tonbridge and Malling district, in the county of Kent, England. It is part of the small village of Plaxtol.

== Location ==
Nearby settlements include the town of Sevenoaks, the villages of Borough Green and Ightham and the hamlet of Sheet Hill.

== Transport ==
It is about half a mile away from the A227 road.
