= Prees railway station =

Railway station in Shropshire, England

Coordinates: 52.8992°N 2.6895°W

Prees
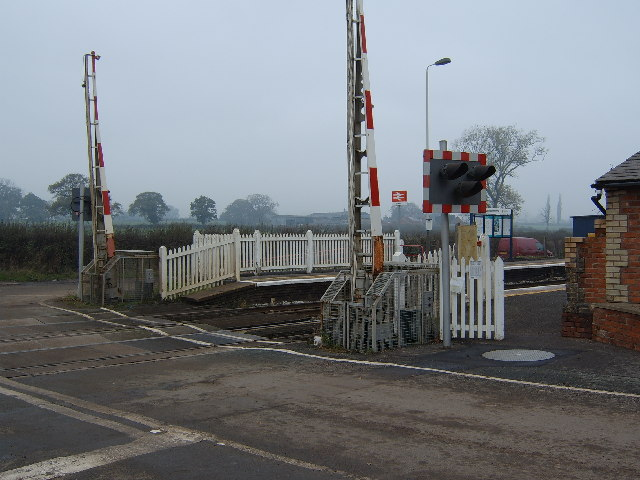

General information
- Location: Prees, Shropshire Council; England
- Grid reference: SJ537337
- Manager: Transport for Wales
- Platforms: 2

Other information
- Station code: PRS
- Classification: DfT category F2

History
- Opened: 1858

Passengers
- 2021/22: ▲3,362
- 2022/23: ▲4,230
- 2023/24: ▲5,750
- 2024/25: ▲9,328
- 2025/26: ▼8,306
Location
Notes
- Passenger statistics from the Office of Rail and Road

Prees railway station serves the village of Prees in Shropshire, England, although the station is a mile to the west of the village and in the parish of Wem Rural. The station is 18 miles 36 chains (29.7 km) from Crewe South Junction (approximately 14.0 mi (22.5 km) north of Shrewsbury) on the Welsh Marches Line. It was opened by the Crewe and Shrewsbury Railway in 1858.

The station has two platforms and trains only stop here upon request. It is managed by Transport for Wales.

== Facilities ==
It is unstaffed and has no ticketing provision - tickets must be bought on the train or prior to travel. The old buildings that once stood here have been demolished (as has the signal box following resignalling work in 2013) and only standard waiting shelters are now provided. Train running information is offered via CIS displays, timetable posters and customer help points on each side (there is also a payphone on platform 2). Step-free access is available to both platforms via ramps and the road crossing at the north end.

== Services ==
Monday to Saturdays there is generally a two-hourly service from here southbound to Shrewsbury and northbound to Crewe. These are mostly local trains stopping at all stations en route, but two on weekdays continue to Swansea via the Heart of Wales Line and some early morning and late evening trains are through trains to either Manchester Piccadilly or Cardiff Central. Six southbound and four northbound trains call on Sundays.

| Preceding station | National Rail | Following station |
|---|---|---|
| Wem | Transport for Wales; Welsh Marches Line | Whitchurch |
