= Yorton railway station =

Railway station in Shropshire, England

Coordinates: 52.809°N 2.736°W

Yorton
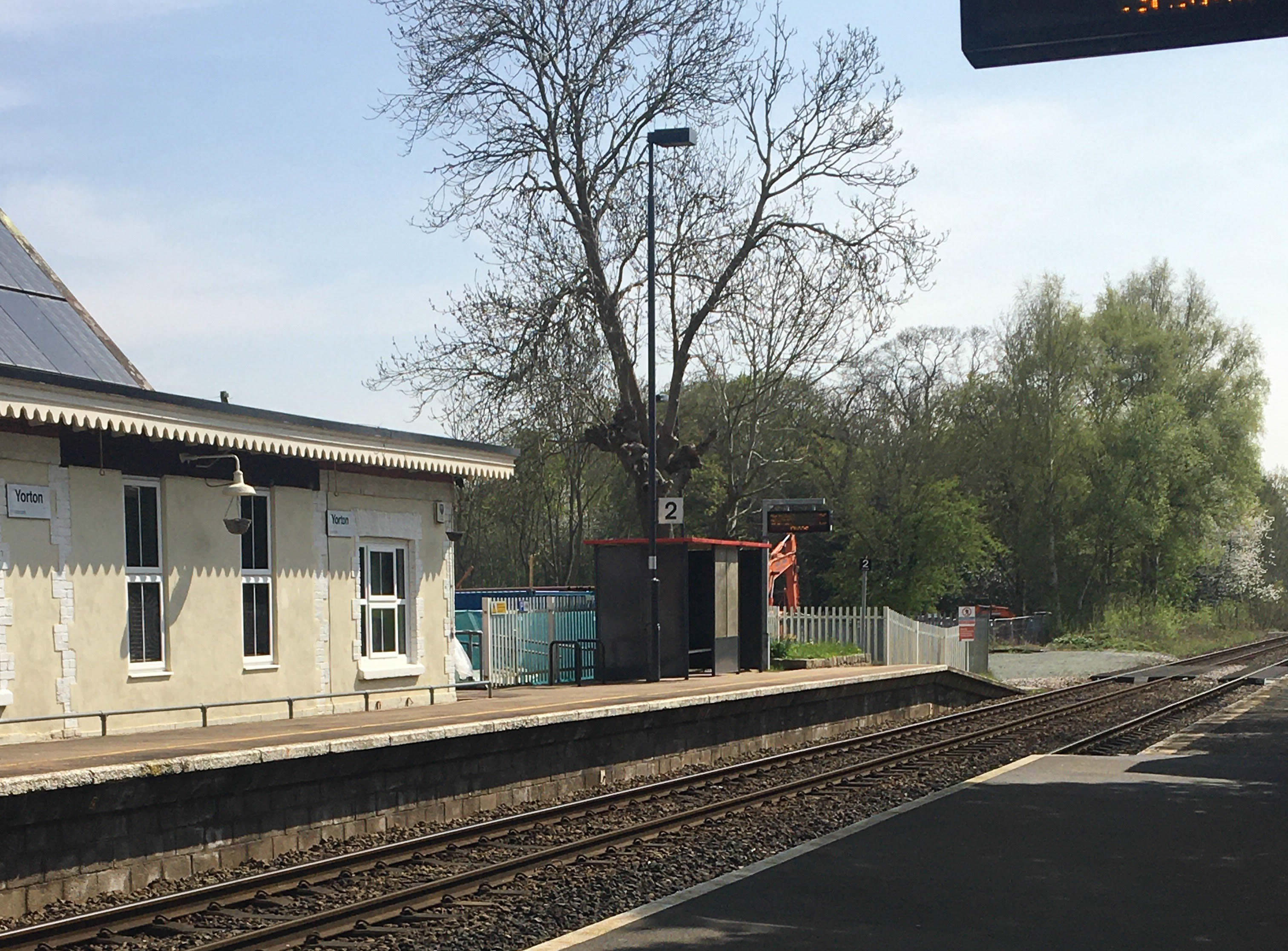
- Yorton station in 2020, looking southbound towards Shrewsbury

General information
- Location: Yorton, Shropshire Council; England
- Grid reference: SJ504237
- Manager: Transport for Wales
- Platforms: 2

Other information
- Station code: YRT
- Classification: DfT category F2

History
- Opened: 1858

Passengers
- 2021/22: ▲6,494
- 2022/23: ▲7,292
- 2023/24: ▲8,240
- 2024/25: ▲8,554
- 2025/26: ▲9,880
Location
Notes
- Passenger statistics from the Office of Rail and Road

Yorton railway station serves the villages of Yorton and Clive in Shropshire, England. It is 7¼ miles (11.5 km) north of Shrewsbury on the Welsh Marches Line towards Crewe. It has two platforms and dates from 1858. Trains only stop here upon request.

The station was designated for the axe in Dr Beeching's report "The Reshaping of British Railways" in 1963; however it was ultimately saved.

== Facilities ==
The station is unstaffed and has no ticket provision (so these must be bought on the train or in advance); the old buildings still stand but are now privately owned. There are shelters on both sides and train running information is provided via CIS displays, a customer help point on platform 1, a payphone on platform 2 and timetable poster boards. Step-free access is available only on the southbound platform.

== Services ==
Monday to Saturdays there is generally a two-hourly service from Yorton southbound to Shrewsbury and northbound to Crewe. Two of these in each direction (weekdays only) run to/from Swansea via the Heart of Wales Line. Some early morning and late evening express services between Manchester Piccadilly and Cardiff Central also call here. On Sundays, Yorton is served by five trains in each direction, most starting from or finishing at Manchester Piccadilly or Cardiff Central. A normal weekday service operates on most Bank holidays.

All trains that stop here only do so on request. This means that any passengers wishing to alight at the station must inform the conductor on the train to arrange with the driver for the train to stop. Any passengers wishing to get on at the station must make their intent clear to the driver.

Preceding station	National Rail	Following station
Shrewsbury	Transport for Wales; Welsh Marches Line	Wem
	Historical railways	
Hadnall; Line open, station closed	London, Midland and Scottish Railway; Crewe and Shrewsbury Railway	Wem; Line and station open

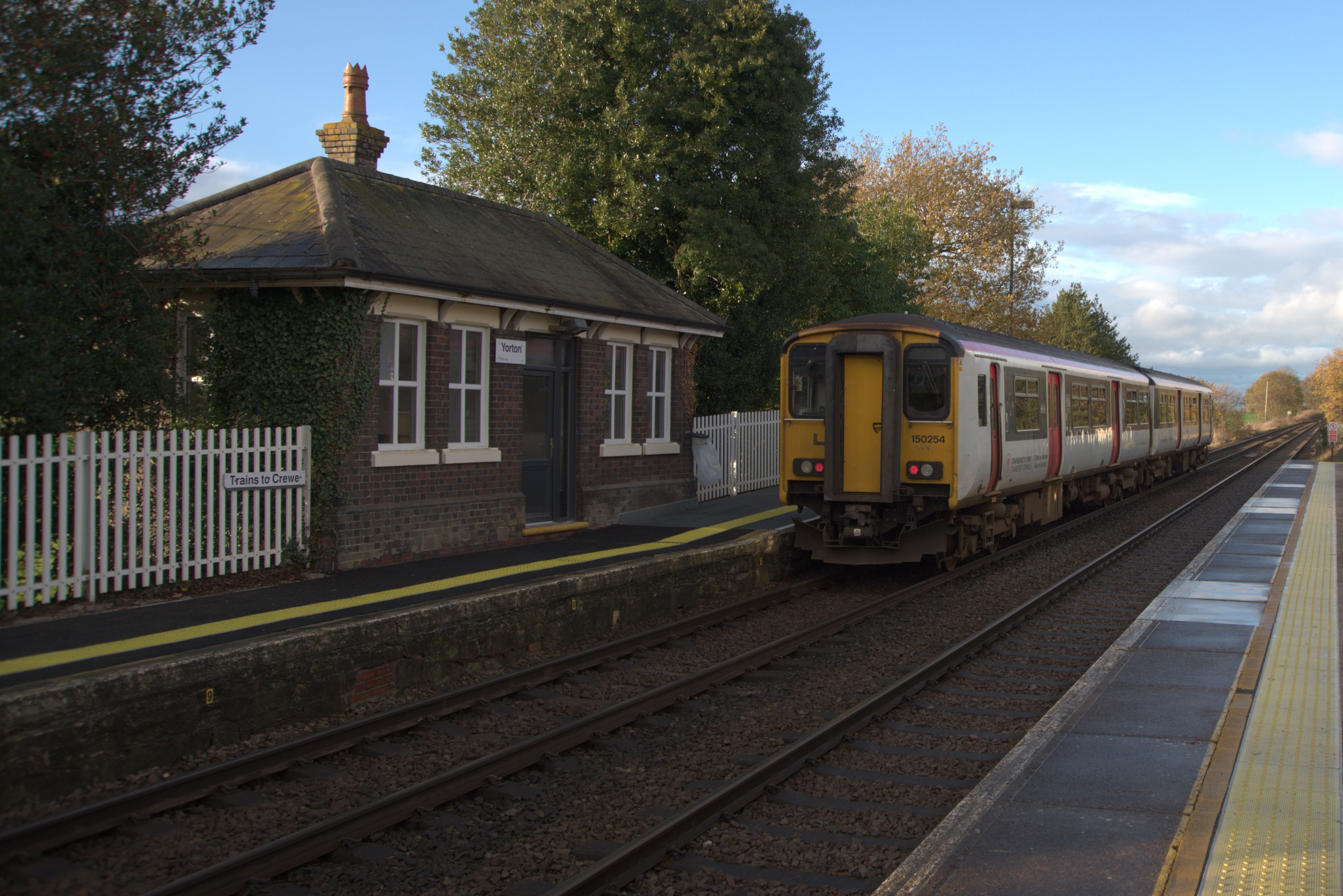
Yorton station platform 1 looking northbound towards Crewe, November 2025.

== Bibliography ==
- Mitchell, Vic; Smith, Keith (2013). Shrewsbury to Crewe. Middleton Press. pp. 26–28. ISBN 9781908174482. OCLC 880765045.
