= Prees =

Village in Shropshire, England

Coordinates: 52.897°N 2.666°W

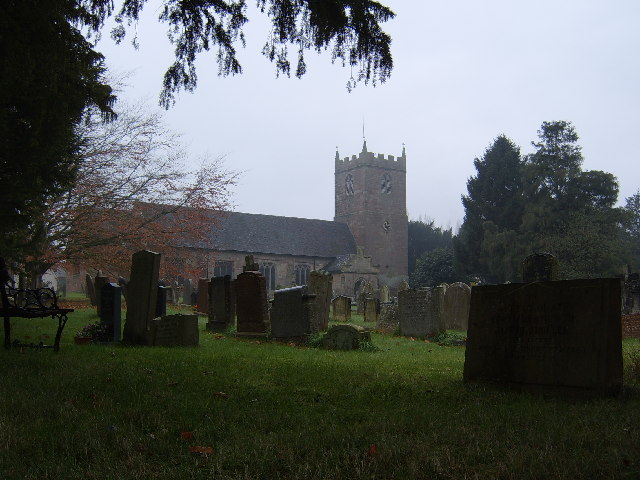
- St Chad's church, Prees, dating from the 14th century, with an 18th-century tower

- Location within Shropshire
- Population: 939 (Village); 2,895 (Civil Parish) (2011 Census)
- OS grid reference: SJ553335
- Civil parish: Prees
- Unitary authority: Shropshire
- Ceremonial county: Shropshire
- Region: West Midlands
- Country: England
- Sovereign state: United Kingdom
- Post town: WHITCHURCH
- Postcode district: SY13
- Dialling code: 01948
- Police: West Mercia
- Fire: Shropshire
- Ambulance: West Midlands
- UK Parliament: North Shropshire

Prees (/priːz/) is a village and civil parish in north Shropshire, near the border between England and Wales. Its name is Celtic and means "brushwood".

== Prees civil parish ==
The civil parish includes many other villages and hamlets as well as the namesake Prees Village. Examples include the villages Prees Higher Heath and Prees Green and the hamlets of Prees Lower Heath and Prees Wood (which all share the name Prees). Sandford, Darliston, Fauls and Mickley to the east of the village are also included in the parish. Prees Heath, a nearby village, despite its name, is not part of the civil parish and is actually contained within the neighbouring Whitchurch Rural parish.

The population of the civil parish in 2001 was recorded at 2688, increasing to 2,895 as of the 2011 Census.

== Prees village ==
Prees is northeast of the small town of Wem. It is also west of Market Drayton and south of Whitchurch. The population in 2001 was recorded at 814, increasing to 939 as of the 2011 Census.

=== History ===
The church in the village dates back to the 14th century (when the village was commonly spelt "Prys"), however, the tower is younger.

Several ancient coins were found on farmland outside Prees in 2017. They included four 300-year-old coins that date to the reign of James I and Charles I.

Also located in Prees in the Prees Church of England Primary School and Nursery, a Victorian building that holds much history. There are a number of other churches in the village.

=== Transport ===
==== Roads ====
The A41 and A49 roads pass on either side of the village.

==== Railway ====
West of the village of Prees, but not in the village or the parish as the name would suggest, is the railway station of Prees opened in 1858. It lies on the Welsh Marches Line, between Whitchurch and Wem. There is a regular service with pre-determined stops. The station is not in the village itself because Captain Black, a wealthy resident in the village stated that the station had to be exactly one mile away from the centre of the village, which at the time was the mill, located (still today) on Mill Street. This was so that it could be easily reached as a route out with the goods produced.

==== Bus ====
The village is served by the 511 bus route, operated by Arriva Midlands North, which runs between Shrewsbury and Whitchurch via Wem. Some services terminate in Wem and do not continue to Whitchurch.

Bus services in Prees, Shropshire
| Bus operator | Route | Destination(s) | Notes |
|---|---|---|---|
| Arriva Midlands North | 511 | Shrewsbury → Hadnall → Wem → Prees → Whitchurch | Some services terminate in Wem. |

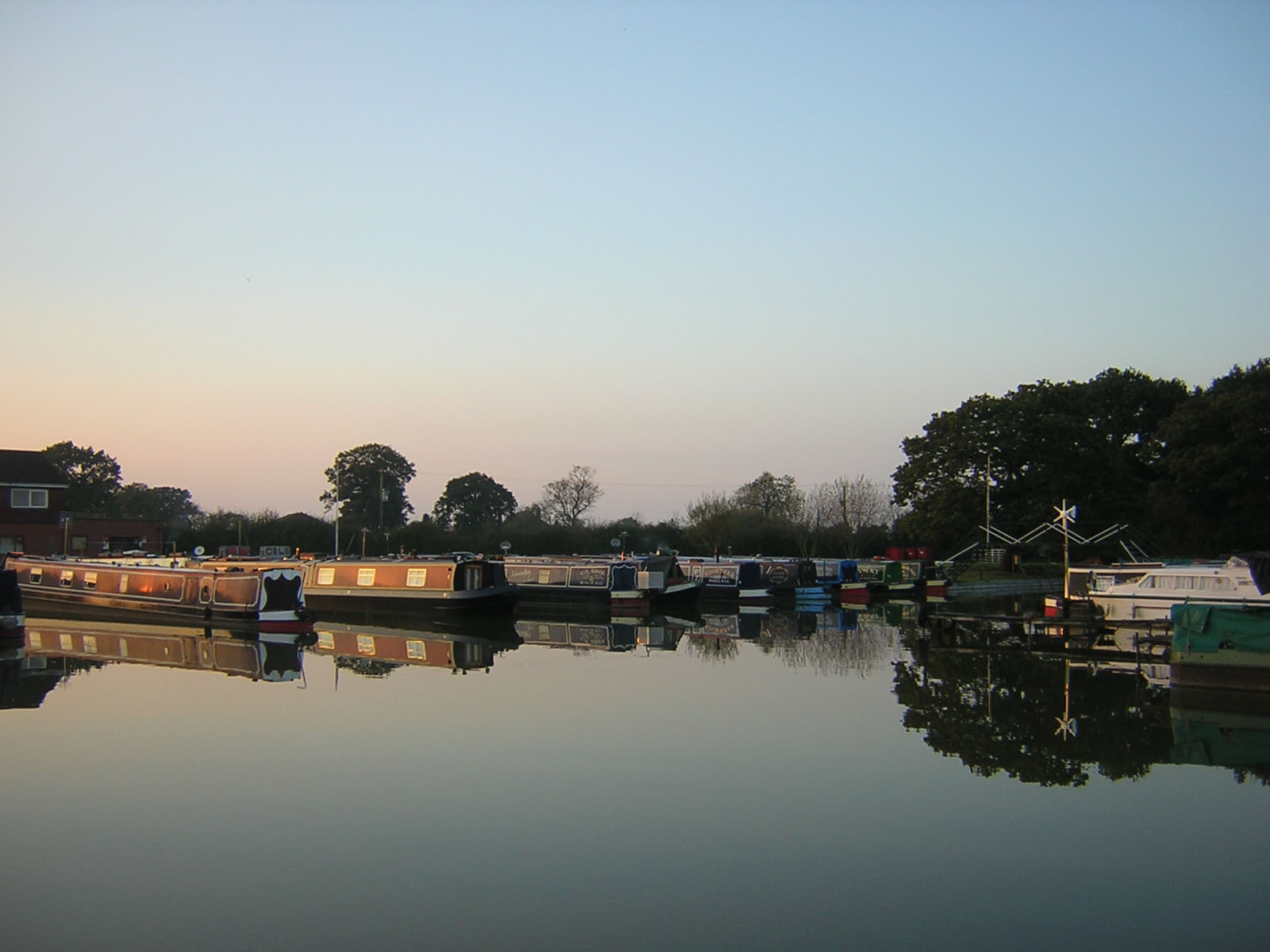
Evening over Whixall Marina

==== Canals ====
Prees was the intended destination of an arm of the Ellesmere Canal. However, the arm was only completed as far as Quina Brook. The arm is now known as the Prees Branch of the Llangollen Canal, and is navigable for about a mile to Whixall Marina; the following 3/4 mile is still followable on the towpath as it passes through Prees Branch Canal Nature Reserve.

=== Notable people ===
- James Fleetwood (c.1603-1683) an English clergyman, vicar of Prees and later Bishop of Worcester.
- Thomas Gilbert (1613 in Prees – 1694) an English ejected minister of the seventeenth century.
- Philip Henry (1631–1696) an English nonconformist clergyman and diarist, ordained in Prees in 1657.
- Rowland Hill, 1st Viscount Hill (1772 in Prees Hall – 1842) a British Army officer who served in the Napoleonic Wars, ultimately Commander in Chief. His Doric column stands in Shrewsbury.
- Robert Chambre Hill (1778 in Hawkstone Hall – 1860) a British Army cavalry officer, fought in the Peninsular War.
- Clement Delves Hill (1781 in Hawkstone Hall – 1845) a British Army officer who fought in the Battle of Waterloo.
- Thomas Noel Hill (1784 in Hawkstone Hall - 1832) a British Army officer who fought in the Battle of Waterloo.
- John Allen (1810-1886) a Church of England clergyman, Archdeacon of Salop 1847-1886, was Vicar of Prees 1846-1883.
- Francis Sandford, 1st Baron Sandford KCB, PC (1824–1893) known as Sir Francis Sandford a British civil servant who implemented the Elementary Education Act 1870 (33 & 34 Vict. c. 75), buried in Prees.
- Henry Maddocks (1871 in Prees — 1931) an English lawyer and Conservative Party politician.
- Thomas Oakley (1879 in Prees – 1936) a British electrician and politician, MP for The Wrekin 1924-1929
- William Hutchings (1879 – 1948 in Prees) soldier and English amateur cricketer, played in 24 first-class matches for Kent and Worcestershire.

== Governance ==
An electoral ward in the same name exists. This ward stretches northeast to Adderley with a total ward population taken at the 2011 census of 4,281.

== See also ==
- Listed buildings in Prees
