= Hadnall =

Village in Shropshire, England

Coordinates: 52.775°N 2.709°W

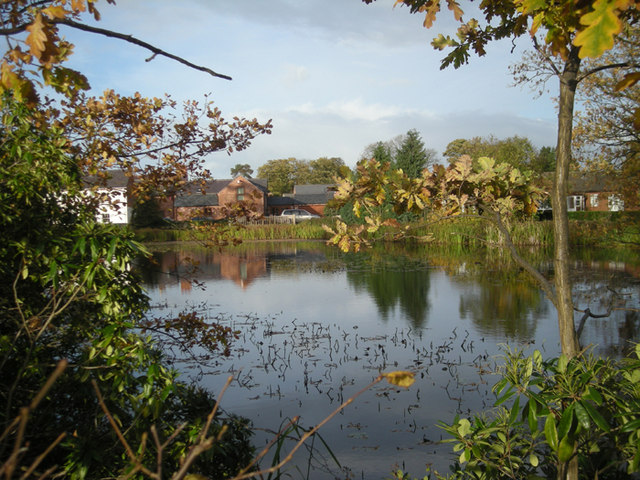
- The village pond at Hadnall

- Location within Shropshire
- Population: 688 (2011)
- OS grid reference: SJ521199
- Civil parish: Hadnall
- Unitary authority: Shropshire
- Ceremonial county: Shropshire
- Region: West Midlands
- Country: England
- Sovereign state: United Kingdom
- Post town: SHREWSBURY
- Postcode district: SY4
- Dialling code: 01939
- Police: West Mercia
- Fire: Shropshire
- Ambulance: West Midlands
- UK Parliament: North Shropshire

Hadnall is a village and civil parish in Shropshire, England. It lies on the A49, some 9 km north-north-east of Shrewsbury. The population of the civil parish at the 2011 census was 688. The Welsh Marches Line runs just outside the village and there was once a railway station. Today, Hadnall has a primary school, a successful village shop, a pub and two AA Rosette restaurants.

The village church is dedicated to St. Mary Magdalene. General Sir Rowland Hill, 1st Viscount Hill, who lived at nearby Hardwick Grange, is buried here, as was writer Charles Hulbert who lived at Providence Grove. John Bromley, future trade union leader and Labour MP, whose parents lived at Haston Grove in the parish, was born and baptised here in 1876. Church of England clergyman Horace Lambart, 11th Earl of Cavan died in retirement at Plex House in the parish in 1950.

Hadnall was formerly part of the old parish of Myddle.

A real ale brewery, The Salopian Brewery, is based at Old Station Yard on Station Road, Hadnall. It moved to this location in 2014 having previously operated from Shrewsbury.

The village is served by the 511 bus route, operated by Arriva Midlands North, which runs between Shrewsbury and Whitchurch via Wem. Some services terminate in Wem and do not continue to Whitchurch.

Bus services in Hadnall, Shropshire
| Bus operator | Route | Destination(s) | Notes |
|---|---|---|---|
| Arriva Midlands North | 511 | Shrewsbury → Hadnall → Wem → Prees → Whitchurch | Some services terminate in Wem. |

== See also ==
- Listed buildings in Hadnall
