= Welsh Marches line =

Railway line linking Wales and England

Coordinates: 52°5′14″N 2°41′23″W

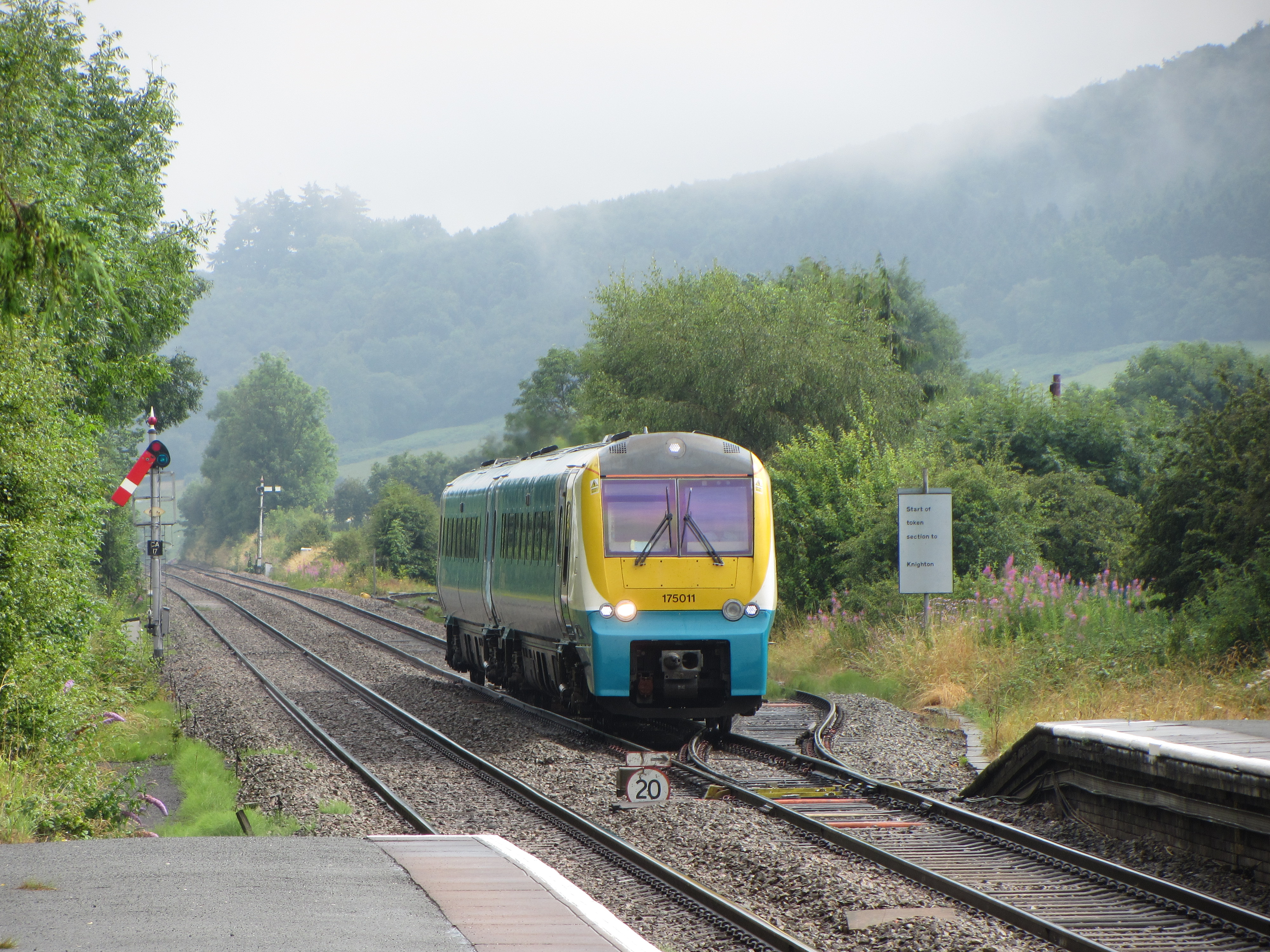
- An Arriva Trains Wales Class 175 approaching Craven Arms

Overview
- Owner: Network Rail
- Locale: West Midlands (region); Wales; North West England
- Termini: Newport; Crewe/Chester
- Stations: 17 (Newport to Crewe) / 15 (Newport to Chester)

Service
- System: National Rail

Technical
- Line length: 84.38 miles (135.80 km)
- Number of tracks: Double track throughout
- Track gauge: 4 ft 8 1/2 in (1,435 mm) standard gauge
- Operating speed: 60–90 miles per hour (97–145 km/h)
Route map
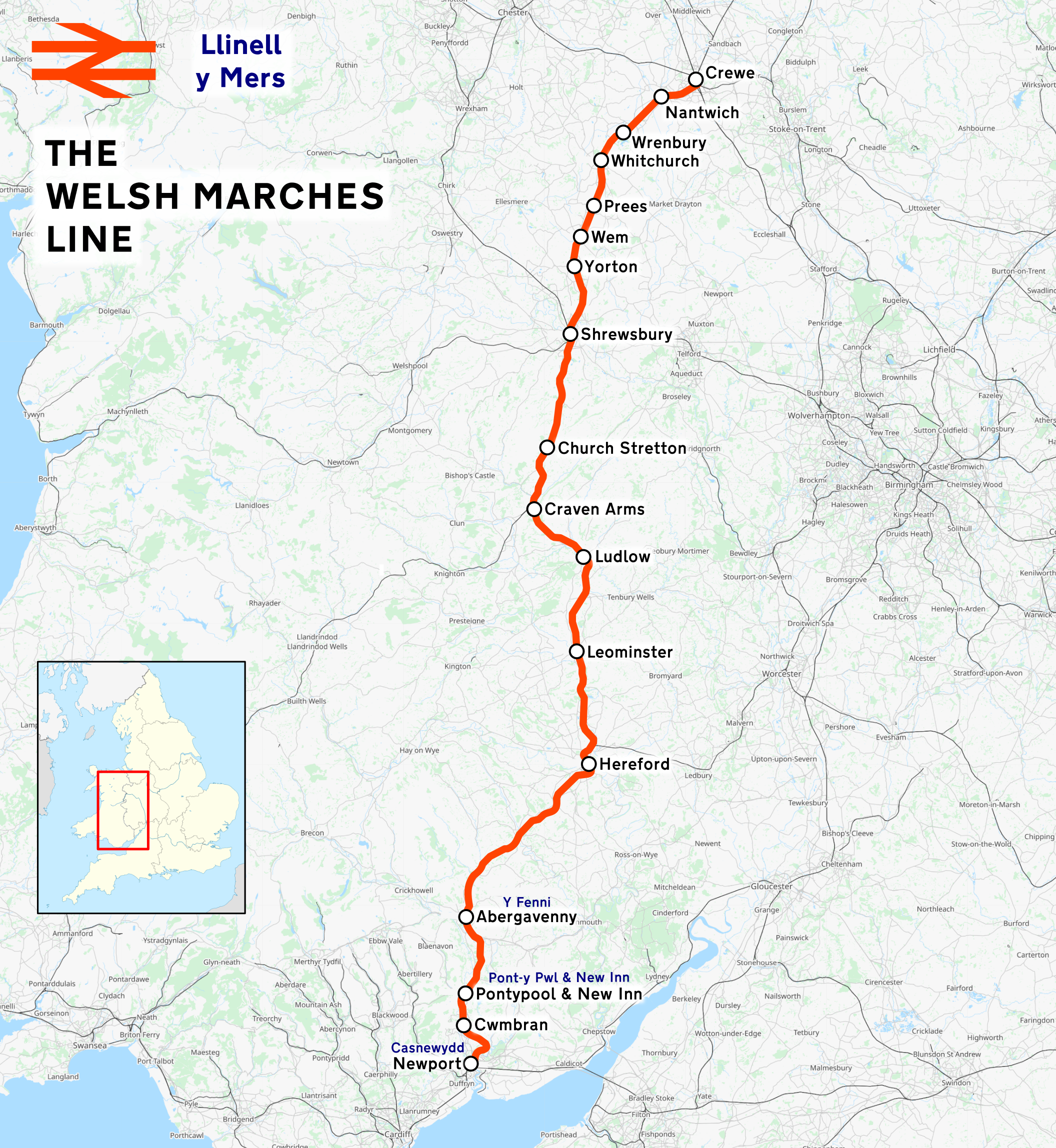
(Click to expand)

The Welsh Marches line (Welsh: Llinell y Mers), known historically as the North and West Route, is a railway line running from Newport in south-east Wales to Shrewsbury in the West Midlands region of England. It follows a route by way of Abergavenny, Hereford and Craven Arms and thence, by some definitions, to Crewe via Whitchurch. The line thus links the south of Wales to north-west England, via the Welsh Marches region, bypassing Birmingham. Via the Shrewsbury to Chester line, the line also links the South of Wales to the North of Wales.

== History ==
The line that exists today is the amalgamation of two lines, both with influence from the LNWR. The southern section from Newport to Hereford is formed from the Newport, Abergavenny and Hereford Railway, while the northern section from Hereford to Shrewsbury is formed from the joint GWR/LNWR Shrewsbury and Hereford Railway. Northbound from Shrewsbury to Crewe, the line runs over the LNWR-owned Crewe and Shrewsbury Railway.

When the two railways arrived in the important market town of Hereford, the LNWR had already built Hereford Barton station. The S&HR and the GWR agreed to build Hereford Barrs Court station, which was then also used by the Midland Railway's Hereford, Hay and Brecon Railway. After Hereford Council put pressure on the LNWR, they closed Hereford Barton to passengers, using it as a joint goods depot.

Under the 1960s Beeching Axe, many of the supporting branch lines and the Hereford Barton loop were closed. The remaining Hereford station, Barrs Court, was renamed Hereford and retains its Victorian Gothic architecture.

== Route ==
The cities, towns and villages served by the routes are listed below from south to north:

- Newport
  - connections with the South Wales Main Line and line to Gloucester
- Cwmbran
- Pontypool and New Inn
- Abergavenny
- Hereford
  - connection with Cotswold Line to Worcester
- Leominster
- Ludlow
- Craven Arms
  - connection with the Heart of Wales line to Llanelli
- Church Stretton
- Shrewsbury
  - connection with Cambrian Line to Aberystwyth and Pwllheli, and the line to Wolverhampton
  - through services via the Shrewsbury–Chester line to Wrexham for trains to London and Bidston, Chester then to Holyhead or Manchester
- Yorton
- Wem
- Prees
- Whitchurch
- Wrenbury
- Nantwich
- Crewe
  - connection with West Coast Main Line, and North Wales Coast Line to Holyhead (for ferries to Dublin)
  - through services to Manchester

== Services ==
Transport for Wales operates all passenger services on the line, on the following routes:

- There is a generally hourly service from Manchester Piccadilly to Cardiff Central, Carmarthen or Milford Haven, calling at principal stations.
- A service every two hours from Holyhead to Cardiff Central also uses the Marches line from Shrewsbury southwards.
- Local stopping services operate between Crewe and Shrewsbury
- Services via the Heart of Wales line use the Marches line between Shrewsbury and Craven Arms.

== Great Western Railway ==
While Great Western Railway does not operate any passenger services along the line, the operator moves its Class 800 empty rolling stock at 05:50 and 06:33 in the morning, and 22:10 and 23:38 at night along the Hereford to Newport section of the line, where stock returns to Stoke Gifford depot, near Filton.

First Great Western briefly operated a limited service to Abergavenny as an extension of the service from London Paddington to Hereford, but this was withdrawn after just one year due to low usage.

== Gallery ==
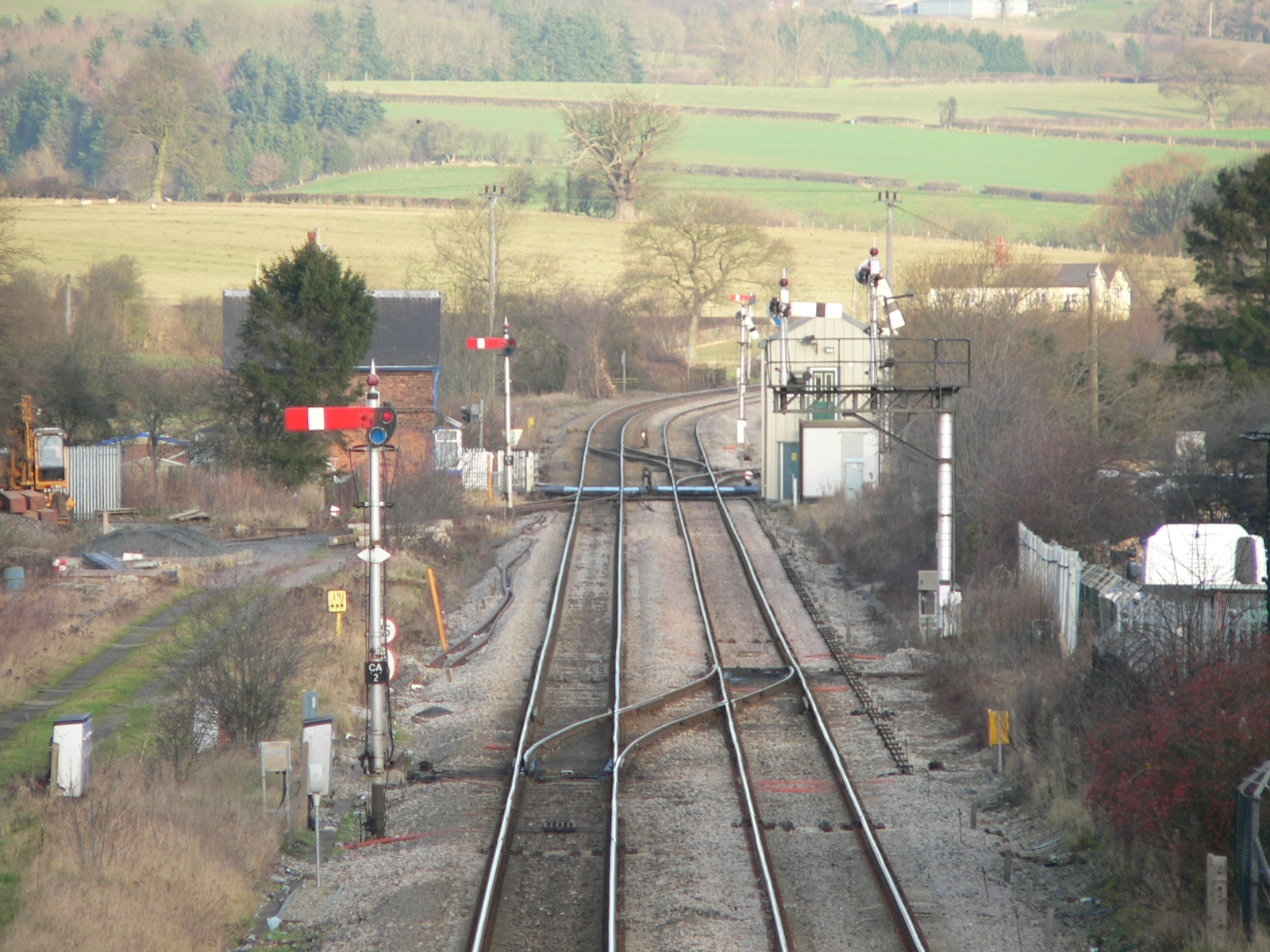
The Welsh Marches Line at Craven Arms, Shropshire

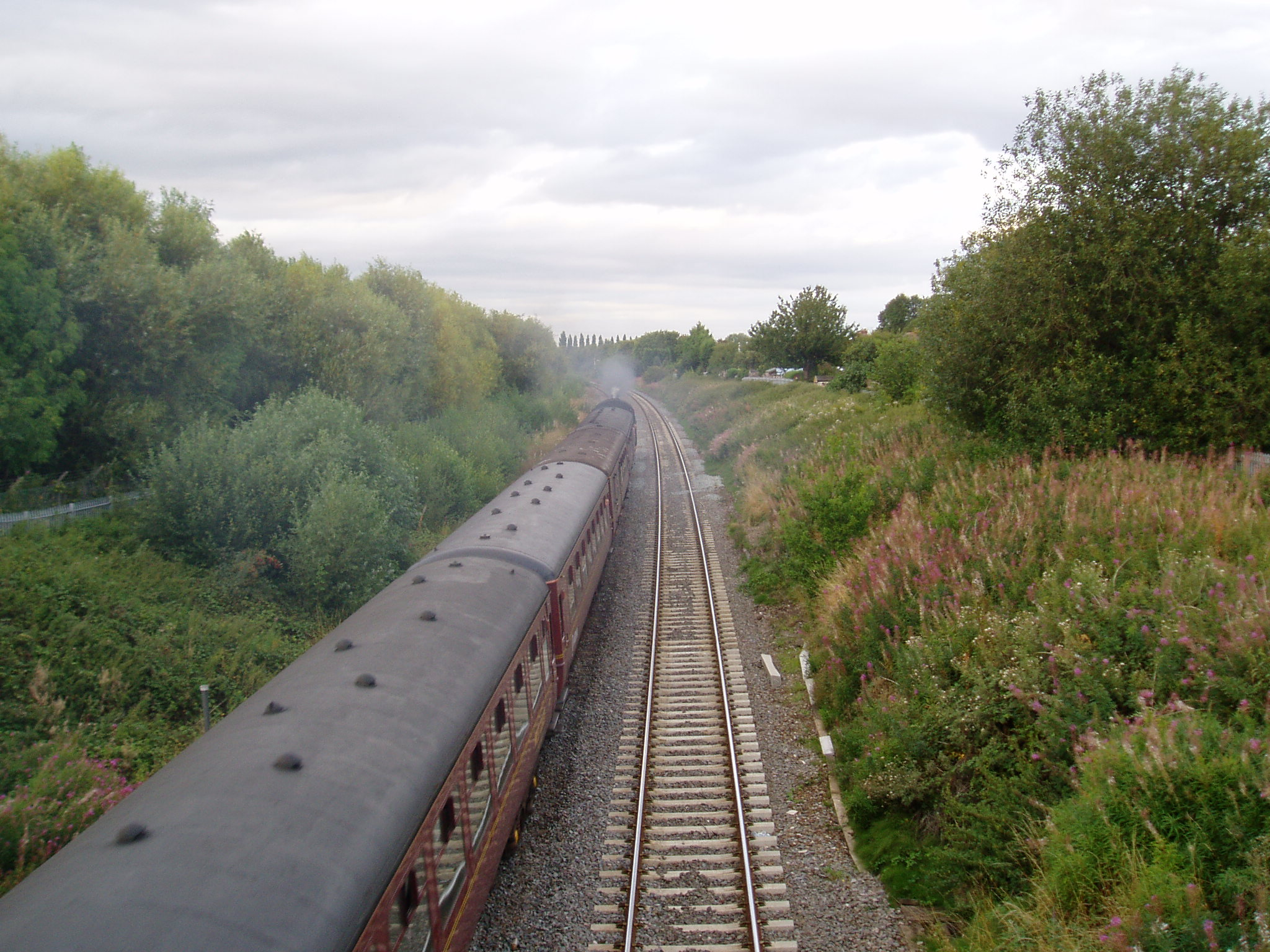
Steam train approaching Harlescott Crossing near Shrewsbury

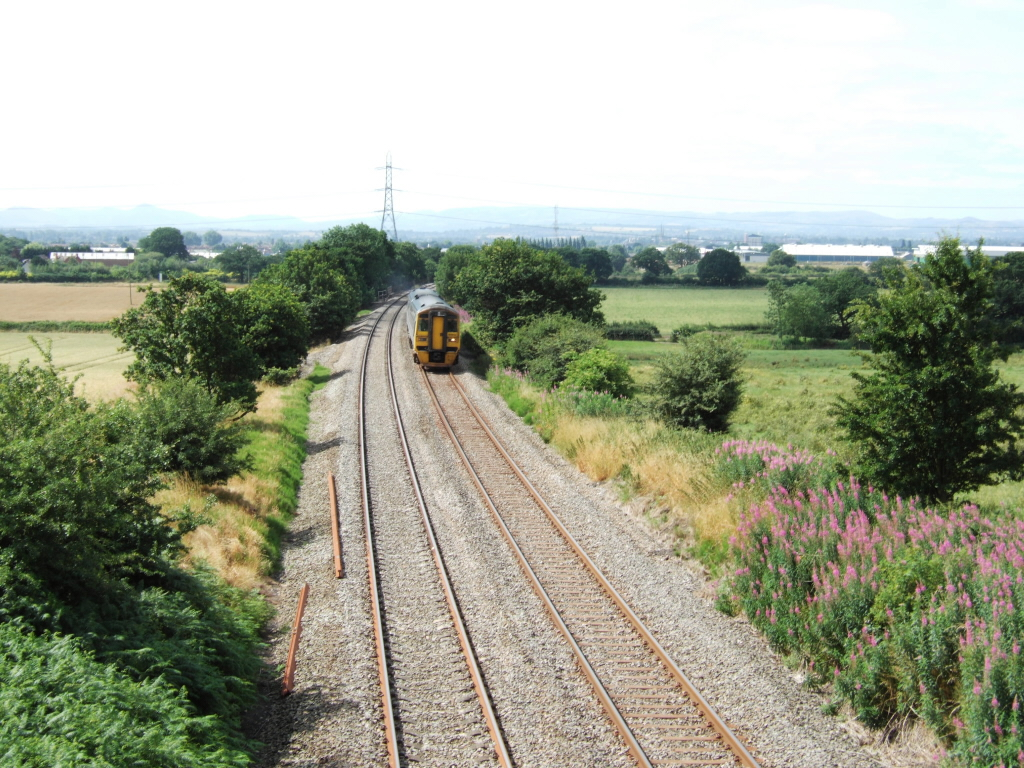
A Class 158 diesel multiple unit running northwards from Shrewsbury to Crewe

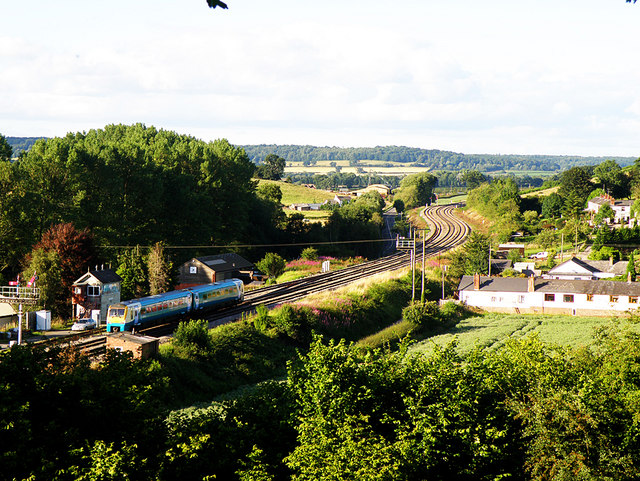
Pontrilas railway station, currently closed, in the very long section without an intermediate station between Abergavenny and Hereford.

== See also ==
- Flounders' Folly
