= South Staffordshire Railway =

The South Staffordshire Railway (SSR) was authorised in 1847 to build a line from Dudley in the West Midlands of England through Walsall and Lichfield to a junction with the Midland Railway on the way to Burton upon Trent, with authorised share capital of £945,000. It was supported by the newly-formed London and North Western Railway (LNWR) and the Midland Railway, giving each company access to important areas. It completed its main line in 1849. As collieries in the Cannock region rose in importance, it built a second main line from Walsall to Rugeley, as well as numerous short spurs and connections to lines it intersected. Colliery working in the Cannock area expanded enormously, and mineral traffic carryings increased in step.

In 1850 the entire company's operation was leased to a private individual, John Robinson McClean, the first time this was ever done. His lease was successful, but the London and North Western Railway wanted control of the network for its own strategic purposes, and it manoeuvred to get the SSR shareholders to transfer the lease to the LNWR; in 1867 the LNWR acquired ownership of the SSR.

Short distance passenger operation in the Walsall area was always buoyant, but in the post-1945 period a decline set in, and industrial retrenchment resulted in a gradual loss of goods and mineral business too. In 1965 a major round of passenger service closures was imposed, although the cessation of services on the Hednesford and Rugeley section was reversed from 1989. This Walsall to Rugeley service and a very short section at Lichfield are the only remaining passenger operations on the former SSR system

== Early railways in Birmingham ==
Birmingham and the surrounding area acquired the epithet The Workshop of the World, supporting a huge range of diverse manufacturing industries. As the requirements of industrial customers became more advanced, it became a feature of Birmingham industry was that one manufacturer would make the basic part of a product, and for that piece to be transferred to another manufacturer for finishing. This resulted in a very large number of increasingly specialised makers, dependent on efficient local goods transport, over a widening local area.

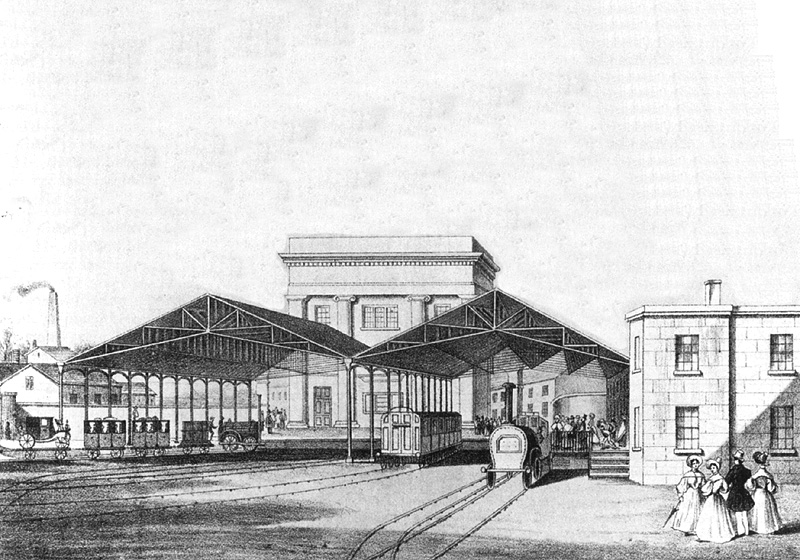
Curzon Street station

The first railways in Birmingham had their terminals on the then eastern margin of the city, (Note: The town of Birmingham was given city status in 1889.) around the Curzon Street station of the Grand Junction Railway and the London and Birmingham Railway; the Birmingham and Derby Junction Railway had a terminus at Lawley Street, a little further out.

In the earliest days this was acceptable; the hilly nature of the centre of Birmingham would have been difficult for early railways to approach, and interchange, particularly between the L&BR and the GJR, were simplified by their proximity. As railway traffic developed, and it became clearer what the dominant traffic flows were, the limitations of this configuration became important, and led to a number of proposed changes.

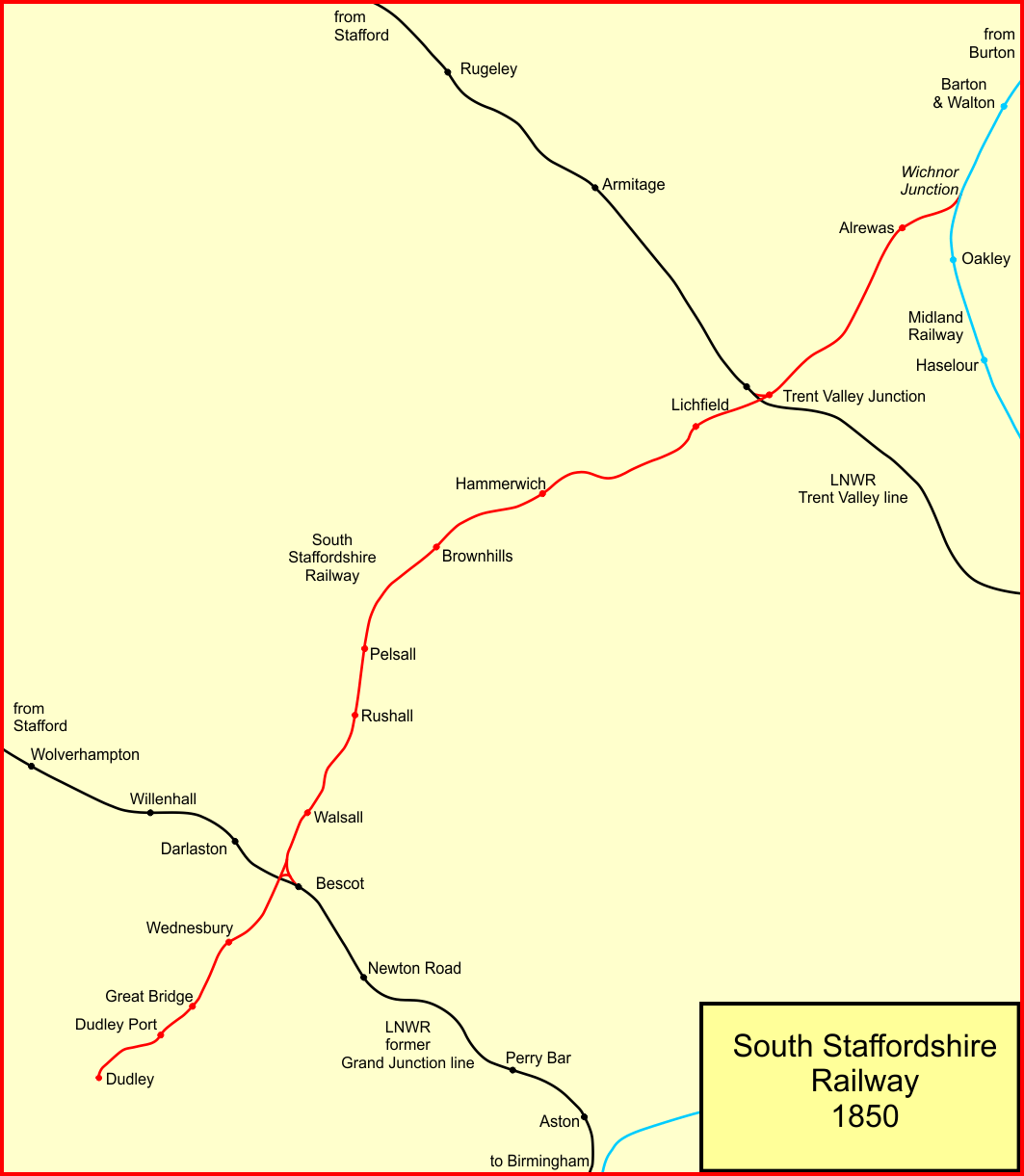
System map of the South Staffordshire Railway in 1850

The earliest railways generally limited themselves to connecting pairs or small groups of major centres, but soon the benefit of amalgamations became apparent, so that larger companies serving larger areas began to develop. This led to the formation of (among others) two large groups with significant presences in Birmingham:

- the Midland Railway, formed on 10 May 1844, with a network from Leeds to Derby and Nottingham, and on to Rugby, and by leases to Gloucester and Bristol in 1845; and
- the London and North Western Railway on 16 July 1846, connecting London, Manchester and Liverpool.

In August 1845, the Oxford, Worcester and Wolverhampton Railway (OW&WR) was obtaining authorisation to build its line. This was a competitive threat to the established railways, but serious financial problems delayed the progress of the OW&WR. Eventually it became aligned with the Great Western Railway (GWR), but that remained in the future for the time being.

As well as these organisational changes, practical difficulties were becoming important in handling traffic that did not start or end its journey in Birmingham, and the Curzon Street stations became a difficult obstruction to such traffic. The formation of the LNWR eliminated a competitive tension that had existed (between the London and Birmingham Railway and the Grand Junction Railway); at the same time the LNWR and the Midland Railway did not see themselves as direct competitors, so that a collaborative approach now seemed possible.

== The core network ==
=== Authorisation: Dudley, Walsall and northwards ===
South Staffordshire Junction Railway Act 1846
- Act of Parliament
- Parliament of the United Kingdom
- Long title: An Act for making a Railway, to be called "The South Staffordshire Junction Railway," with Branches.
- Citation: 9 & 10 Vict. c. ccc

Dates
- Royal assent: 3 August 1846

Walsall and Dudley were important manufacturing towns, and it was to be expected that a railway connection between them would be put forward. The South Staffordshire Junction Railway was proposed to connect the two towns, with junction connections to the Grand Junction Railway, now to be part of the LNWR. The SSJR got its authorising act of Parliament, the South Staffordshire Junction Railway Act 1846 (9 & 10 Vict. c. ccc) on 3 August 1846, with permitted share capital of £525,000.

Trent Valley, Midlands and Grand Junction Railway Act 1846
- Act of Parliament
- Parliament of the United Kingdom
- Long title: An Act for making a Railway from Walsall in the County of Stafford to the Midland Railways at Wichnor Forge in Tatenhill, to be called "The Trent Valley, Midlands, and Grand Junction Railway."
- Citation: 9 & 10 Vict. c. cccxvi

Dates
- Royal assent: 3 August 1846

South Staffordshire Railway Act 1847
- Act of Parliament
- Parliament of the United Kingdom
- Long title: An Act to empower the South Staffordshire Railway Company to make divers Branch Railways; and for other Purposes.
- Citation: 10 & 11 Vict. c. clxxxix

Dates
- Royal assent: 9 July 1847

Text of statute as originally enacted

At the same time, another company, the Trent Valley, Midlands and Grand Junction Railway was authorised. It was to make a line from Walsall northwards through Lichfield to join the Midland Railway main line (heading towards Burton-on-Trent) at Wichnor. It too was authorised on 3 August 1846, by the Trent Valley, Midlands and Grand Junction Railway Act 1846 (9 & 10 Vict. c. cccxvi), with capital of £420,000.

The two companies had been in discussion and saw there were advantages in combining, and this was allowed for in their respective acts of Parliament. Final agreement for this was accomplished on 6 October, ratified by an act of Parliament, the South Staffordshire Railway Act 1847 (10 & 11 Vict. c. clxxxix), of 9 July 1847. The 1847 act also confirmed a change of name for the combined company, which was to be called the South Staffordshire Railway; the combined share capital was fixed at £945,000; in addition the act granted running powers over the Midland Railway from Wichnor Junction to Burton.

=== First construction: Walsall to Bescot ===
Although the act of Parliament authorised the share capital, the company had to obtain the share subscriptions, as well as acquire the necessary land. The board decided on a modest start to construction, by building from Walsall to Bescot on the former Grand Junction Railway route.

This was quickly accomplished, and the line was opened on 1 November 1847; temporary station premises were used at Walsall, south of Bridgeman Place, and the line connected to a junction on the GJR main line, called Bescot Junction.

It is probable that the first trains were operated by the LNWR using their own rolling stock. There was no station at the junction. Prior to the opening of the Walsall line, there had been a station further north-west on the GJR line called "Walsall". It was now renamed Bescot Bridge, and it was used for journeys from Wolverhampton and further north to Walsall, by changing there to road transport.

=== Walsall to Wichnor ===
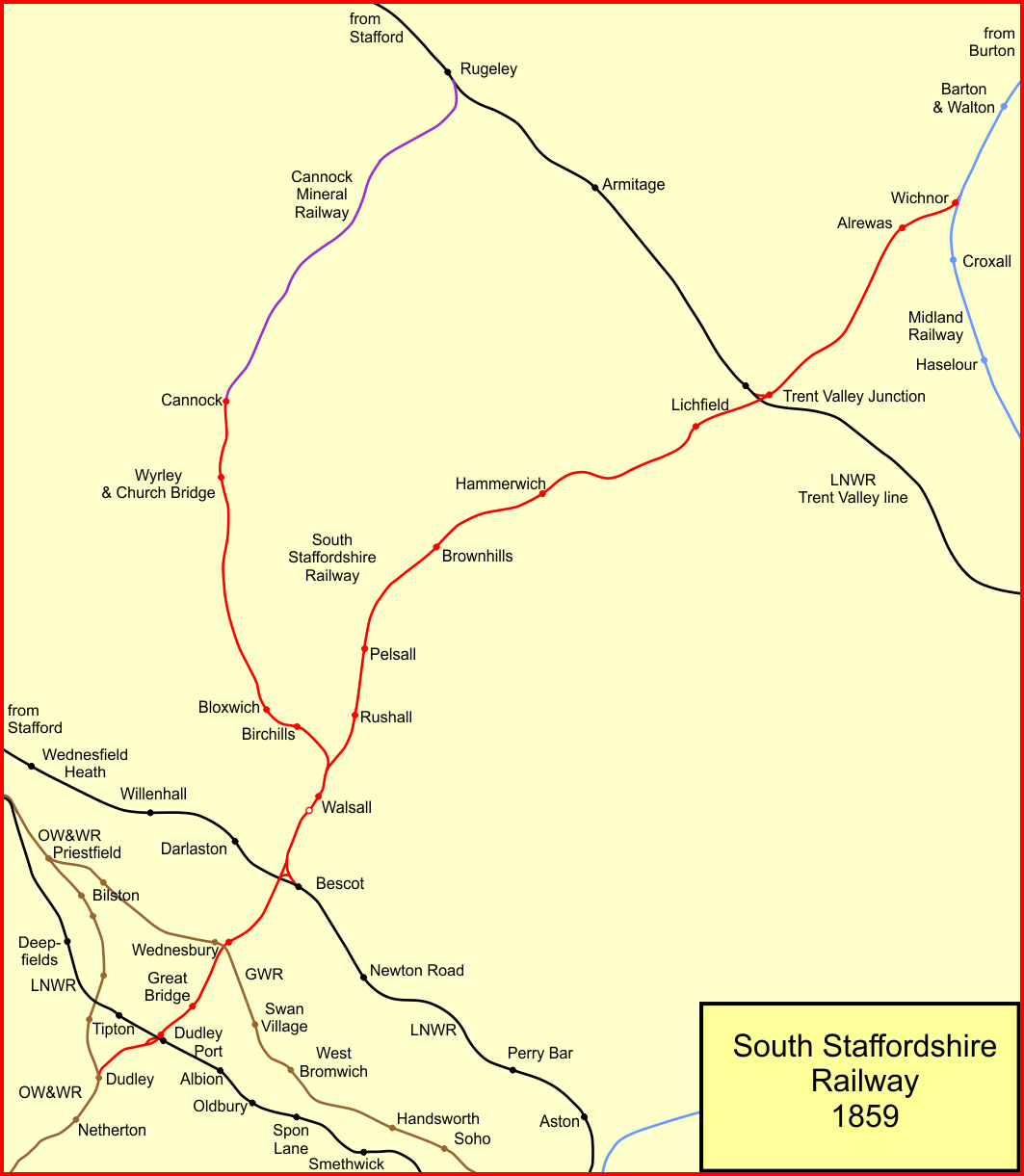
System map of the South Staffordshire Railway in 1859

Of the main line sections originally authorised, there now remained the connection from Walsall to Wichnor Junction, joining the northward Midland Railway main line on the way to Burton: the length of this section was 17 miles. A construction contract was allocated on 17 May 1847. The work proceeded well enough, and on 1 March 1849 Captain Wynne of the Board of Trade inspected the line for passenger working. While much of the line was satisfactory, the junction connecting to the Midland Railway at Wichnor had not been installed. Wynne approved the line for passenger operation between Walsall and Lichfield, a distance of 10 1/2 miles. The company did not open that section at once, but waited until the remainder of the Wichnor route was ready. Wynne inspected the remainder of the line on 4 April 1849 and approved it, and it opened on 9 April 1849.

However Boynton (1996) says:

The date is often given as 9th April, but all that happened then was the running of a special for Directors, followed by a celebratory lunch at the George Hotel, Lichfield, attended by the mayor of the city and the High Sheriff of Staffordshire. Passenger services for ordinary mortals had to wait until 1st June. That day saw the opening of a permanent station at Walsall, on the present site... A South Staffs station at Lichfield Trent Valley opened in August, eleven months after one on the main Trent Valley line below. The Midland had running rights to Walsall and the LNWR had running rights through Wichnor Junction to Burton and Derby, capital of the Midland system.

The temporary Walsall station was closed and the new permanent station, described by a newspaper as "splendid" was put into use.

== South to Dudley ==
Now the company extended its line southwards to Dudley, from a new junction off the Walsall to Bescot line, a distance of five miles. However the section of line presented to the Board of Trade inspecting officer for approval for passenger operation was not approved. Goods traffic (not needing that approval) started on 1 March 1850. On 1 May 1850 the line to Dudley was fully opened, the deficiencies having been rectified. This opening included an east-to-south spur enabling direct running from Bescot Junction to Dudley.

The first Dudley station was a terminus north-east of Tipton Road; for a time the SSR Was the only railway with a presence in Dudley. In 1852 the Oxford, Worcester and Wolverhampton Railway opened its line as far as Dudley, and the South Staffordshire Railway opened a new station adjacent to the OW&WR station, but not connected to it. The OW&WR continued northwards the following year. The configuration of the two stations was still unsatisfactory, and an improved station connected to the OW&WR line platforms was opened in 1859.

== Branches and spur connections ==
The core main line network of the SSR was thus completed. For some time it had been obvious that the original pattern of the earlier main lines was imperfect, and steps were taken to improve matters. In addition the Oxford, Worcester and Wolverhampton Railway was building its line, and the Great Western Railway too was taking steps to make a presence locally. The OW&WR and the GWR were later to align with one another under the GWR name, but for the time being they were far from friendly to one another. Moreover there was a rapid development in manufacturing industry in the area. There was a huge demand for transport of raw materials in and completed goods out, and factories were established in newly developed locations .

Interconnection between railways of diverse ownership was essential in this environment, and the SSR's position cutting across the grain of many main lines resulted in the construction of a number of junctions and spurs to enable transfer traffic.

=== Stour Valley line at Sedgeley ===
The Birmingham, Wolverhampton and Stour Valley Railway was opened in 1852. Usually referred to as the Stour Valley Line, it was an affiliate of the LNWR providing a more satisfactory route between Birmingham and Wolverhampton for that company. A new central station was being constructed in Birmingham, and as New Street station it opened fully in 1854.

South Staffordshire Railway Act 1851
- Act of Parliament
- Parliament of the United Kingdom
- Long title: An Act for enabling the South Staffordshire Railway Company to make a certain Branch Railway, for authorizing Arrangements with the London and North-western Railway Company, and for other Purposes.
- Citation: 14 & 15 Vict. c. xciv

Dates
- Royal assent: 24 July 1851

Text of statute as originally enacted

The Stour Valley line crossed over the Dudley to Walsall line of the South Staffordshire Railway at Dudley Port. (Note: So called because of goods transport on the adjacent Birmingham Canal.) The South Staffordshire Railway Act 1851 (14 & 15 Vict. c. xciv) had authorised a short connecting line to the Stour Valley line with running powers into the LNWR High Level station, and gave the LNWR reciprocal running powers from there to Dudley. The connecting line was known as the Sedgeley Loop (Note: The locality is known as Sedgley, but the railway always used the spelling Sedgeley.) and it ran to a position alongside the new Stour Valley station and beyond it to form a junction with it. There was already a Low Level station at Dudley Port on the SSR main line, but the intention was to have a High Level station alongside the new Stour Valley station. However space at that point was extremely limited, as the Loop line was sandwiched between the Stour Valley line and the canal. Although the Sedgeley Loop and the connection to the Stour Valley line beyond were double track, the SSR station was built as a single line. The Board of Trade inspecting officer, Captain Galton, declined to allow opening of the section of line east of the station. The loop itself to the new SSR High Level station were acceptable, but the continuing through connection was not, apparently because of the perceived danger of working passenger trains from both east and west into the single line station.

A Branch Railway commencing by a Junction with the Main Line of the South Staffordshire Railway at or near the Point where the last-mentioned Railway crosses the Sedgeley Turnpike Road in the Parish and Township of Tipton, and terminating at and by a Junction with the Main Line of the Birmingham, Wolverhampton, and Stour Valley Railway at or near the Point where the last-mentioned Railway crosses the Main Line of the South Staffordshire Railway in the said Township and Parish of Tipton in the County of Stafford, which said last-mentioned Branch Railway and other Works connected therewith will be situate wholly within the said Township and Parish of Tipton in the County of Stafford, and the said Railway and Works, when made, shall be Part of the Undertaking of the South Staffordshire Railway Company. — Section 5, South Staffordshire Railway Act 1851 (14 & 15 Vict. c. xciv)

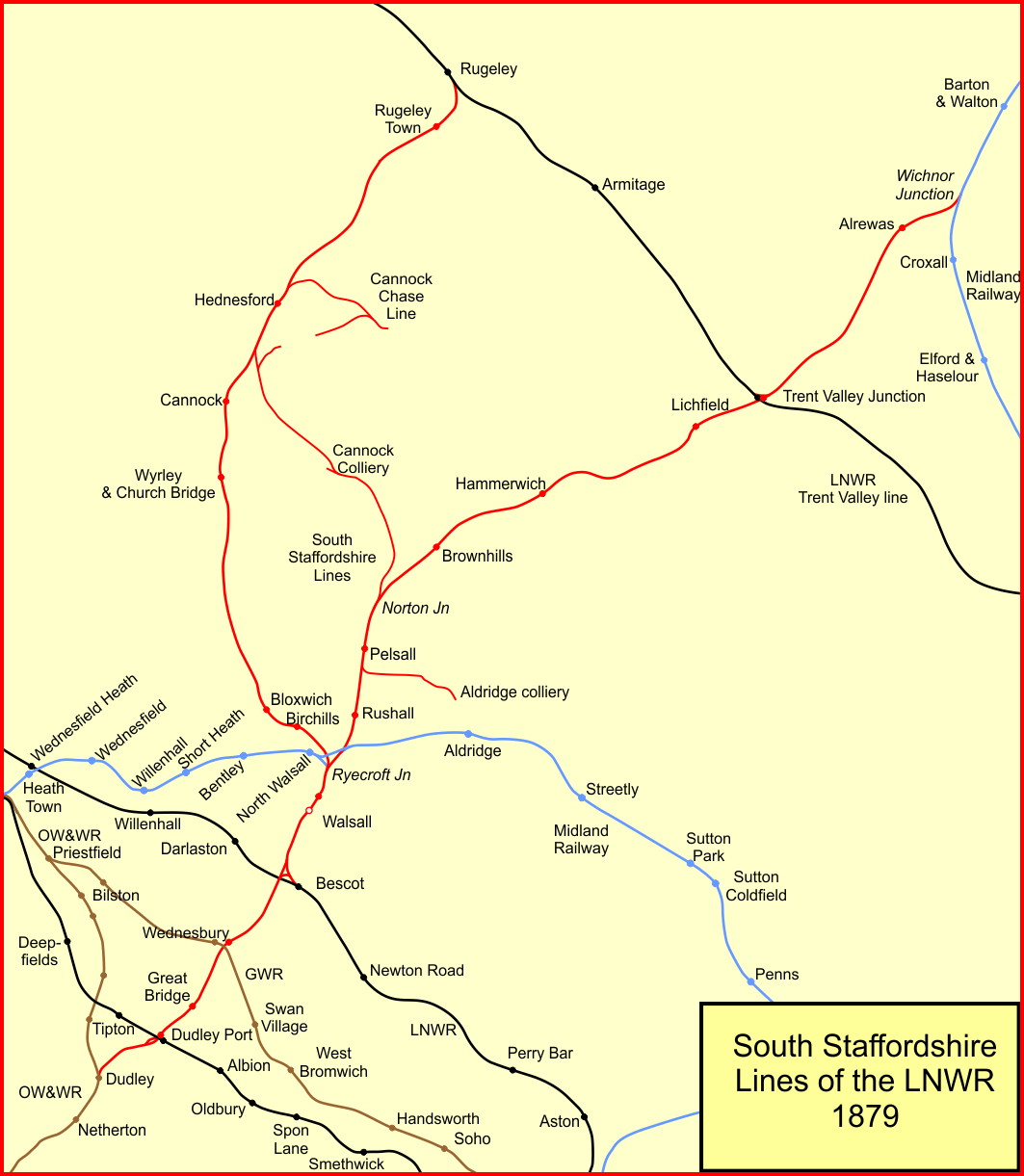
System map of the South Staffordshire Railway in 1879

Use of the loop for trains terminating at Dudley Port started on 14 October 1853, but it was not until a connection was provided at the west end of the Stour Valley station, enabling the use of the BW&SVR platforms by through trains, that through running was permitted. This started on 2 January 1854, with a through passenger service between Dudley and Birmingham.

In 1852 construction of the Oxford, Worcester and Wolverhampton Railway reached Dudley, and was continued to Tipton in 1853. The OW&WR was merged with other railways to form the West Midland Railway (WMR) in 1860 and in turn the WMR was absorbed into the Great Western Railway by the Great Western Railway (West Midland Amalgamation) Act 1863 (26 & 27 Vict. c. cxiii) of 1 August 1863.

The opening of these portions of the OW&WR enabled through working by SSR trains from Kidderminster to Birmingham via the Sedgeley loop, but this service was operationally difficult and it was discontinued south of Dudley in 1867, with only two through New Street to Dudley services each way on weekdays. The connecting service for the short run from Dudley to Dudley Port prospered; it and the Walsall trains together were nicknamed "The Dudley Dasher". The Sedgeley loop service was eventually discontinued on 15 June 1964.

=== Birmingham, Wolverhampton and Dudley Railway ===
In 1846 another line between Birmingham and Wolverhampton had been authorised, on the same day as the original South Staffordshire Junction Railway: it was the Birmingham, Wolverhampton and Dudley Railway. It was nominally independent but very obviously aligned towards the Great Western Railway, which was to build towards Birmingham through the medium of another nominally independent company, the Birmingham and Oxford Junction Railway. The "Dudley" part of the BW&DR name represented a branch line that very closely duplicated most of the SSJR route. Although this had been authorised, the BW&DR agreed to leave the SSR (as it soon became) to build it, with running powers for BW&DR trains. There was a safeguard for the BW&DR if the SSR failed to build the line promptly.

The BW&DR obtained an authorising act of Parliament, the Birmingham, Wolverhampton and Dudley Railway Amendment Act 1847 (10 & 11 Vict. c. cclix) to sell its line to the Great Western Railway, and remarkably the act authorised installation of mixed gauge (standard and broad gauge) track on the BW&DR. When the line opened in 1854 local passenger trains operated on the broad gauge.

The SSR intersected and was crossed by the BW&DR at Wednesbury and a north-east to north-west connection was installed on 1 June 1859, connecting the SSR to the BWDR route to Wolverhampton. It was laid with mixed gauge track, but the broad gauge rails were removed on 1 April 1869. The SSR had running powers over the BW&DR to Wolverhampton, although it is believed they were never exercised.

=== Wednesbury to Darlaston branch ===
South Staffordshire Railway Act 1855
- Act of Parliament
- Parliament of the United Kingdom
- Long title: An Act for enabling the South Staffordshire Railway Company to make certain Branch Railways; for the Purchase of additional Lands at Wichnor and Dudley; and for other Purposes.
- Citation: 18 & 19 Vict. c. clxxv

Dates
- Royal assent: 23 July 1855

Text of statute as originally enacted

The South Staffordshire Railway Act 1855 (18 & 19 Vict. c. clxxv) of 23 July 1855 gave authorisation to build from Wednesbury SSR to Darlaston on the old GJR route. A single line opened on 14 September 1863 from the Darlaston former GJR station to Wednesbury. The Darlaston station was renamed James Bridge and a platform was provided on the Darlaston branch. The line was doubled on 22 December 1872. At first there was an intensive passenger service, of 56 daily trains; but the introduction of street-running trams practically wiped out the business and the passenger service was discontinued in 1887.

A Railway commencing by a Junction with the South Staffordshire Railway, at or near the Wednesbury Station of the same Railway, in the Parish of Wednesbury, and terminating by a Junction with the London and North-western Railway in the Parish of Darlaston near the Darlaston Passenger Station. — Section 4, South Staffordshire Railway Act 1855 (18 & 19 Vict. c. clxxv)

The line was closed north of the Lloyds Works Siding at Fallings Heath on 24 December 1963; most of the rest of the line (except for a siding at the southern extremity) closed at the beginning of 1968.

=== Wednesbury – Princes End – Tipton branch ===
The South Staffordshire Railway Act 1855 also authorised a branch from Wednesbury to a triangular junction with the Stour Valley line at Tipton, penetrating a heavily industrialised area around Princes End. There was some delay in completing it, but it was opened on 14 September 1863. The south curve at Tipton to Tipton Station Junction was opened on 1 January 1883, and was not used for passenger traffic, except much later for diversionary purposes.

A Railway commencing by a Junction with the South Staffordshire Railway at or near the Wednesbury Station aforesaid in the said Parish of Wednesbury, and terminating by a Junction with the Birmingham, Wolverhampton, and Stour Valley Railway at or near the Tipton Station of the same Railway in the Parish of Tipton, and by a Junction with the Orford, Worcester, and Wolverhampton Railway in the Parish of Sedgley at or near the Point where a Tramway leading from the Dimock's Collieries passes by a Bridge over the said Railway. — Section 4, South Staffordshire Railway Act 1855 (18 & 19 Vict. c. clxxv)

A Walsall to Wolverhampton passenger service operated (to the northward curve) and its fate varied greatly, as there were better routes available for such a connection. The passenger services were withdrawn in 1916 as a wartime measure, and the line closed completely on 6 April 1981.

=== Leighs Wood colliery branch ===
A two-mile branch line was authorised by an act of Parliament in 1878, earlier (1855) powers having lapsed; it ran eastward from the SSR line near Pelsall to Leighs Wood colliery. The line opened on 14 November 1878, serving only a colliery and a brickworks; it closed in August 1965.

=== New Pleck curve ===
A west to north curve was provided at Pleck, connecting the old GJR route from Bushbury to the SSR route towards Walsall. It was authorised by the London and North-western Railway (New Lines) Act 1877 (40 & 41 Vict. c. xliv) on 28 June 1877 and opened on 1 March 1881.

The Walsall Junction (one mile and fifty links in length), commencing in the township of the Foreign of Walsall, in the parish of Walsall in the county of Stafford, by a junction with the Grand Junction Railway of the Company, and terminating in the same township by a junction with the South Staffordshire Railway of the Company. — Section 4, London and North-western Railway (New Lines) Act 1877 (40 & 41 Vict. c. xliv)

On the same day the Portobello curve opened, connecting the GJR route into Wolverhampton LNWR station directly from the south-east for the first time. This enabled a Walsall to Wolverhampton passenger service. It was discontinued from 1964 but reinstated from 2000 with an hourly diesel multiple unit service, but closed to passengers once again from 2008.

== Control of the company ==
=== Leasing the company ===
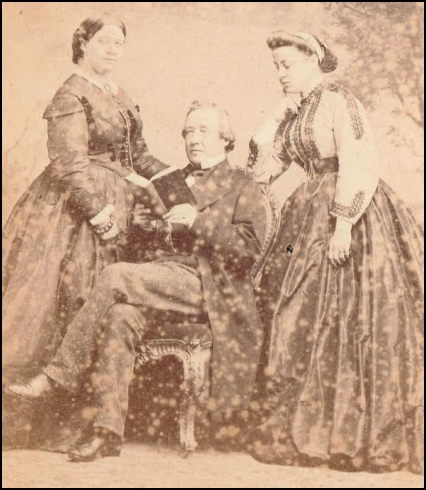
John Robinson McClean with his wife and eldest daughter

In 1849 with the main line only just completed, John Robinson McClean, the engineer to the SSR company, together with supporting business people, approached the SSR with an offer to lease the railway. The LNWR and MR were substantial shareholders and were opposed to the arrangement, fearing that the line would ally itself with competitors, but the majority of the shareholders considered that the offer was advantageous to them, and the idea was approved.

South Staffordshire Railway Leasing Act 1850
- Act of Parliament
- Parliament of the United Kingdom
- Long title: An Act to enable the South Staffordshire Railway Company to lease their Undertaking; and for other Purposes.
- Citation: 13 & 14 Vict. c. lviii

Dates
- Royal assent: 15 July 1850

Text of statute as originally enacted

The necessary powers were included in the South Staffordshire Railway Leasing Act 1850 (13 & 14 Vict. c. lviii). The issued capital of the SSR was calculated as £669,375 and the rent charge was to be 2% of this in the first year, amounting to £13,387 10s., doubling after the first year and increasing to 5% after 14 years. The lease between McClean and the company became effective from 1 July 1850. No individual had ever been authorised by Parliament to lease a railway before, so this was a considerable precedent. After an initial period, McClean contracted train operation to the LNWR in 1852.

=== Relations with the Midland Railway ===
In 1853 James Allport became general manager of the Midland Railway, and from that time relations between that company and the SSR became strained. Through running at Wichnor Junction was discontinued at Allport's insistence, and exchange sidings had to be built there for handing over goods wagons. A "Wichnor" passenger station also had to be built, just inside SSR territory, for the exchange of engines on through passenger trains. SSR passengers heading for Derby had to change at Burton. Whatever Allport's objective was, this pushed the SSR closer to the LNWR.

=== LNWR control ===
Towards the end of the 1850s the LNWR interests worked hard to make McClean's lease unworkable; the LNWR clearly wanted to acquire the line. In 1858 McClean and the company agreed to discontinue the lease arrangement, and this was formally agreed on 21 January 1858. Negotiations to agree the financial implications of the disengagement were extremely protracted, and McClean's lease terminated on 1 February 1860. He was compensated for the loss of profit for the residue of his lease; the sum was £110,099, which Boynton (1996) says, "made an already wealthy man stupendously rich".

From that date the LNWR took over the lease. The Midland Railway had been a significant influence within the company from the outset, but now their involvement diminished. The LNWR lease was anticipated to be for 99 years. However, in common with many other railway leases, the advantages of outright control were compelling. Moreover the LNWR feared that the Midland Railway might get control of the line, establishing a significant presence in LNWR territory. The lease continued for a time, but arrangements were made to transfer the SSR company to LNWR ownership. The transfer was ratified by the London and North Western Railway (New Works and Additional Powers) Act 1867 (30 & 31 Vict. c. cxliv) of 15 July 1867.

The SSR network was now part of the LNWR, although there were running powers protections retained for the Midland Railway. This was a double edged sword, for it gave the LNWR, as owner of the SSR network, running powers over the Midland Railway into Burton. This was an attractive benefit, of which the LNWR intended to take full advantage.

The LNWR sent a goods train to exercise the running powers to Derby via Wichnor Junction. The train found the line blocked at the junction. Neele (1904) wrote,

Arriving at Wichnor Junction I was surprised to see a large number of platelayers, about, two or three engines in steam, and a saloon carriage in the siding. One of the engines with steam up had attached to its tender the V crossing of the junction over which we had to pass to get to Burton... Mr Needham [the superintendent of the Midland], who had bivouacked all night in the saloon, refused to allow the LNW train to pass. On asking Mr Needham for what purpose the force of Midland men was requisitioned, he told me that it was reported that the London and North Western were coming down with a body of 300 men and three engines intending to force their way into Burton, and that it had been determined to resist. Instructions came to me by telegraph: once more at the appointed time in the afternoon, a passage must be claimed. Some wiser counsels had prevailed at Derby, for when the time came, the opposing force had disappeared, and we made a triumphal journey towards Burton.

== Cannock lines ==
=== Reaching Cannock ===
South Staffordshire Railway Act 1854
- Act of Parliament
- Parliament of the United Kingdom
- Long title: An Act for enabling the South Staffordshire Railway Company to make Branch Railways to Cannock and Norton, to acquire additional Lands in the Parish of Wednesbury, and for other Purposes.
- Citation: 17 & 18 Vict. c. liii

Dates
- Royal assent: 2 June 1854

Text of statute as originally enacted

In the South Staffordshire Railway Act 1847 there were powers to build from Walsall to Cannock, which was becoming an important centre of extractive industry. The SSR did not progress this work at the time, but got an extension of time in the South Staffordshire Railway Act 1854 (17 & 18 Vict. c. liii). In addition a three mile branch line was now authorised from near Pelsall on the SSR Lichfield line, to Norton Canes. Although the engineering of the line was relatively simple, there was a problem over the lack of a turntable at the Cannock terminus that resulted in a delay to the opening of the line, until 31 January 1858. The Norton Canes branch opened on the same day.

A Branch Railway commencing by a Junction with the South Staffordshire Railway in the Township of Pelsall in the Parish of Wolverhampton, at or near the Point where the Branch to the Railway Colliery diverges from the Main Line of the South Staffordshire Railway, and terminating on the North-west Side of Norton Green in the Parish of Norton at or near the Point where Washbrook Lane leads out of Norton Green. — Section 4, South Staffordshire Railway Act 1854 (17 & 18 Vict. c. liii)

=== Cannock Mineral Railway ===
A prospective railway company called the Derbyshire, Staffordshire and Worcestershire Junction Railway had tried to get parliamentary authority to build from Uttoxeter to Dudley, connecting Manchester in to its network as well by means of running powers. It had been rebuffed, but in the 1847 session a more modest scheme was authorised by the Derbyshire, Staffordshire and Worcestershire Junction Railway Act 1847 (10 & 11 Vict. c. cx) from the North Staffordshire Railway at Uttoxeter to Cannock, making an end-on connection with the (proposed) SSR line there. Several years passed without much progress, largely due to failure to generate share subscriptions, and attempts to bring one of the large railway companies on board as a financial sponsor were also fruitless.

A further reduction in scope was necessary, and the title of the Cannock Mineral Railway (CMR) was adopted. Further prevarication followed until in June 1857 the LNWR appeared as guarantor. The line was finally built, between Cannock and Rugeley only, opening on 2 November 1859; it was worked by the LNWR.

=== Norton branch ===
A colliery line was opened on 1 February 1858 from Norton Junction to Norton Crossing Junction, a distance of 2 3/4 miles.

=== Cannock Chase Railway ===
The Cannock Chase Railway was authorised in 1860 to provide a link between the Cannock Mineral Railway and the Marquis of Anglesey's colliery interests. It ran east from Hednesford to Rawnsley, with a spur to Heathy Leasows to connect with the Littleworth Tramway. The Cannock Chase Railway was opened on 7 October 1862, and was worked by the collieries themselves.

=== Norton branch extension railway ===
A continuation of the Norton branch from Norton Crossing Junction opened on 25 April 1879. The line continued to East Cannock Junction on the Walsall to Rugeley line, forming a through route.

== Grouping and nationalisation, and afterwards ==
In 1923 the London and North Western Railway was incorporated within the new London Midland and Scottish Railway (LMS), as part of a process known as the "Grouping" of the railways, following the Railways Act 1921. By this time the distinct character of the former South Staffordshire Railway was waning. In 1948 the railways were once again reorganised, following the Transport Act 1947, which resulted in the LMS being taken into national ownership as part of British Railways.

Following the end of World War II there was a steep decline in the use of local passenger trains, and of wagonload goods services, and British Railways accumulated huge losses. While some small-scale closures had taken place in the 1950s, by the following decade it was plain that the situation needed to be managed.

=== Passenger service withdrawals ===
There was a nationwide wave of withdrawal of unremunerative passenger services during the 1960s. The former Western Region (ex-GWR) services from Birmingham Snow Hill to Dudley were withdrawn on 15 June 1964, and the Walsall to Dudley line closed to passengers on 6 July 1964; Dudley station was therefore closed. The following year a large-scale passenger closure took place on 18 January 1965: from Walsall to Wichnor Junction via Lichfield; from Walsall to Water Orton via Sutton Park; from Walsall to Wolverhampton via Pleck; and Walsall to Rugeley.

This left passenger operation on only the short section from Walsall to Bescot Junction, and a short length at Lichfield.

=== Electrification ===
In the mid 1960s an extensive electrification programme was undertaken involving main line routes through Birmingham and elsewhere. As part of the work, the short section from Bescot to Walsall was electrified, from 15 August 1966.

The Hednesford and Cannock line was not opened to passenger trains until later, but in 2014 it was announced that the line between Walsall and Rugeley was to be electrified, with a completion date of 2017.

Lichfield City and the short link on the former SSR route to Lichfield Trent Valley were served by the Cross-City line passenger services from 1978 and 1988 respectively. On 6 June 1993 the Cross-City services, and this short former SSR section, were electrified.

=== Rugeley passenger services ===
Passing through an area which after World War II was subject to industrial decline, usage of the passenger trains on the Cannock and Rugeley line declined steeply, and the passenger service had been discontinued from 18 January 1965. All the intermediate stations between Walsall and Rugeley Trent Valley were closed to passengers.

The Walsall Area Passenger Group made strenuous efforts during 1974 to get the line reopened to passengers. A reconstructed and modernised station was opened at Walsall in 1980, giving impetus to the idea. The group were successful, and passenger services were reinstated between Walsall and Hednesford on 10 April 1989. The line north of Hednesford had been reclassified operationally as a goods line, and re-equipping it for passenger operation was stated to be excessively costly. However in November 1993 it was announced that the line would be reopened to passengers, but then the necessary work was greatly delayed and the services did not begin until March 1997. There were 13 trains each way daily.

=== Dudley Freightliner Terminal ===
As passenger use ceased, it was considered that Dudley station would be a good location for a freightliner terminal, particularly as the rail connectivity was good. It was opened on 6 November 1967. However the facility lasted only 21 years and was closed on 17 April 1988.

=== Cannock mineral traffic ===
Although coalmining in the Cannock area had declined substantially in the post-war period, there were still several operational collieries in 1965. These declined, but changing activity by the coal and electricity generating industries resulted in novel traffic flows. Nevertheless in the late 1970s substantial closure had taken place, and even a new opencast location at Essington Wood closed in 1992. Rugeley 'B' power station opened in 1970.

== Incidents ==
On 22 December 1859 one passenger jumped from a Walsall to Birmingham train near Perry Barr railway station and was killed, and others were injured, due to the train, using South Staffordshire Railway rolling stock, being derailed by one of its carriages shedding a tyre.

== The present day ==
As of 2022 heavy rail passenger operation takes place from Bescot (now named Bescot Stadium) to Walsall; and on to Rugeley; and from Lichfield City Station to Lichfield Trent Valley.

The line from Lichfield Trent Valley to Wichnor Junction has (2022) only one regular passenger service, the 08:11 Leeds to Plymouth, but it is used from time to time by trains between Burton and Birmingham when engineering works or other causes make the route through Kingsbury unavailable.

== Locations ==
=== Dudley – Walsall – Wychnor route ===
- Dudley; temporary station, opened 4 May 1850; extended to permanent station after a few months; closed 6 July 1964;
- Sedgeley Junction; divergence to Dudley Port High Level;
- Dudley Port; opened 1 May 1850; closed 6 July 1964;
- Great Bridge North; opened 1 May 1850; renamed Great Bridge North 1 July 1950; closed 6 July 1964;
- Wednesbury; opened 1 May 1850; renamed Wednesbury Town 13 June 1960; closed 6 July 1964;
- Bescot Curve Junction; divergence to Aston;
- Pleck Junction; convergence from Aston;
- Walsall; temporary station opened 1 November 1847; replaced by permanent station 9 April 1849; still open;
- Ryecroft Junction; divergence to Cannock linel
- Rushall; opened 24 March 1856; closed 1 March 1909;
- Pelsall; opened 9 April 1849; closed 18 January 1965;
- Brownhills; opened 9 April 1849; renamed Brownhills High Street 2 June 1924; renamed Brownhills 1 August 1930; closed 18 January 1965;
- Hammerwich; opened June 1849 ;closed 18 January 1965;
- Lichfield City; opened 9 April 1849; renamed Lichfield City 1871; relocated 3 November 1884; still open;
- Lichfield Trent Valley Junction; 9 April 1849; replaced by Lichfield Trent Valley High Level 3 July 1871; closed 18 January 1965; reopened 28 November 1988; still open;
- Brookhay; opened 9 April 1849; closed December 1849;
- Alrewas; opened 9 April 1849; closed 18 January 1965;
- Wichnor Junction (station); opened 2 April 1855; closed 1 November 1877;
- Wichnor Junction; convergence with Midland Railway main line.

=== Cannock and Rugeley route ===
- Walsall; above;
- Ryecroft Junction; above;
- Birchills; opened February 1858; closed 1 January 1916;
- Bloxwich; opened 1 February 1858; closed 18 January 1965; reopened 17 April 1989; still open;
- Bloxwich North; opened 2 October 1990; still open;
- Landywood; opened 2 March 1908; closed 1 January 1916;
- Wyrley and Church Bridge; opened 1 February 1858; renamed Wyrley and Cheslyn Hay 1 December 1912; closed 18 January 1965;
- Cannock; opened 1 February 1858; closed 18 January 1965; reopened 10 April 1989; still open;
- Hednesford; opened 7 November 1859; closed 18 January 1965; reopened 10 April 1989; still open;
- Brindley Heath; opened 3 August 1939 and 17 August 1939 for RAF families; fully open 26 August 1939; closed 6 April 1959;
- Rugeley Town; opened 1 June 1870; closed 18 January 1965; reopened 2 June 1997; still open;
- Rugeley Trent Valley; opened 15 September 1847; still open.

== Bibliography ==
- Boynton, John (1996). Rails Around Walsall, Yesterday and Today. Kidderminster: Mid England Books. ISBN 978-0-9522248-3-9.
- Boynton, John (1993). Rails Across The City: The Story of the Birmingham Cross City Line. Kidderminster: Mid England Books. ISBN 978-0-9522248-0-8.
- Cobb, Michael H. (2003). The Railways of Great Britain – A Historical Atlas. Shepperton: Ian Allan Publishing. ISBN 978-0-7110-3003-9.
- Gillham, John C. (1988). The Age of the Electric Train: Electric Trains in Britain since 1883. London: Ian Allan Ltd. ISBN 0-7110-1392-6.
- MacDermot, Edward T. (1927). History of the Great Western Railway. Vol. I: 1833 – 1863 Part II. London: Great Western Railway.
- Neele, George P. (1904). Railway Reminiscences. London: McCorquodale & Co.
- Oppitz, Leslie (1993). Shropshire and Staffordshire Railways Remembered. Newbury: Countryside Books. ISBN 978-1-85306-264-3.
- Reed, Malcolm C. (1996). The London and North Western Railway: A History. Penryn: Atlantic Transport Publishers. ISBN 978-0-906899-66-3.
- Yate, Bob (2010). South Staffordshire Railway. Vol. 1: Dudley-Walsall-Lichfield-Burton. Usk: Oakwood Press. ISBN 978-0-85361-700-6.
- Yate, Bob (2011). The South Staffordshire Railway. Vol. 2: Walsall to Cannock. Usk: Oakwood Press. ISBN 978-0-85361-717-4.
