= Stafford Road railway station =

Short-lived railway station in Wolverhampton, West Midlands

Stafford Road

General information
- Location: Wolverhampton, West Midlands; England
- Coordinates: 52.6018°N 2.1321°W
- Grid reference: SJ911004
- Platforms: 2

Other information
- Status: Disused

History
- Original company: Shrewsbury and Birmingham Railway

Key dates
- October 1850: Opened
- June or July 1852: Closed
Location

Stafford Road railway station served the city of Wolverhampton, historically then in Staffordshire, England from 1850 to 1852 on the Wolverhampton–Shrewsbury line.

The station opened in October 1850 by the Shrewsbury and Birmingham Railway. The station was situated to the west of Stafford Road at the present site of Stafford Road Junction. The station was served by six trains on Mondays to Saturdays with two on Sundays in both directions between Wolverhampton Temporary and Shrewsbury. It was a short distance from Wolverhampton station and so Stafford Road proved to be unprofitable and closed completely in June or July 1852, contemporary with the closure of Wolverhampton Temporary station and the opening of Wolverhampton High Level.

There is no evidence of the station's existence today.

Preceding station	Historical railways	Following station
Wolverhampton Temporary	Shrewsbury and Birmingham Railway; Wolverhampton–Shrewsbury line	Codsall
