= Birmingham, Wolverhampton and Dudley Railway =

English railway company

The Birmingham, Wolverhampton and Dudley Railway was an English railway company promoted to connect those places by rail. It was authorised by Parliament in 1846. It became apparent that it would be advantageous to merge with the Great Western Railway. The rival London and North Western Railway went to great lengths to frustrate the amalgamation, but ultimately failed, and the merger took place in 1847.

The line was constructed by the GWR and opened in 1854; the Birmingham station was Snow Hill and the Wolverhampton station was later named Low Level. A branch towards Dudley was not ready until 1866. In combination with other lines the BW&DR main line gave the GWR an important through route between London and Birkenhead. The BW&DR section was constructed on the mixed gauge system, but connecting lines further north were only narrow (standard) gauge, and this contributed to the ultimate demise of the broad gauge.

In the railway modernisation of the later 1960s, preference was given to the alternative route on the Stour Valley Line, and the former BW&DR route declined, and closed in 1972. The route from Snow Hill station to Smethwick and on towards Stourbridge was reopened in 1995, and a tram route between Birmingham and Wolverhampton was inaugurated in 1999, using most of the route.

== Conception ==
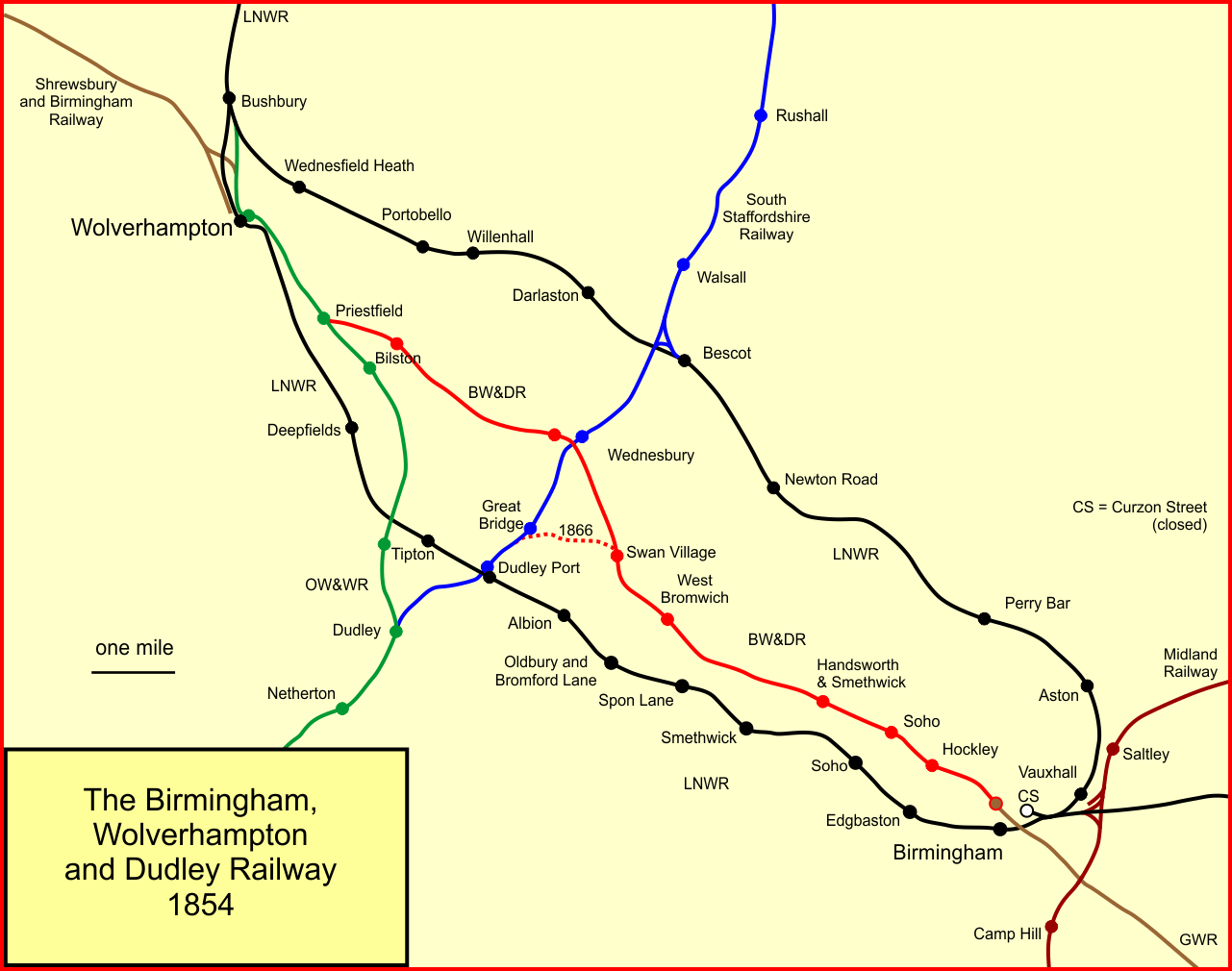
The Birmingham, Wolverhampton and Dudley Railway

The Great Western Railway built a branch line as far as Oxford, reaching the city on 12 June 1844. It began to take steps to extend northward, to Birmingham and perhaps further north. The manufacturing districts of Lancashire, and the port of Liverpool, were attractive destinations for a trunk railway.

The London and Birmingham Railway, the Grand Junction Railway, and the Liverpool and Manchester Railway, working together, already provided a railway connection between London, the West Midlands and the north-west of England, and although the partnership of those lines was not always harmonious, collectively they were determined to keep the GWR and its allies out. A In the 1846 session of Parliament, the Birmingham, Wolverhampton and Dudley Railway was promoted. It was independent, and it was portrayed in the Parliamentary committee process as being local in nature, serving as many industrial sites as possible.

The 1846 session was a busy one, and there were a number of other lines submitted for authorisation, notably the Birmingham and Oxford Junction Railway, the Shrewsbury and Birmingham Railway and its ally the Shrewsbury and Chester Railway. At this stage all were independent of any larger network. In addition there was the Birmingham, Wolverhampton and Stour Valley Railway, which became generally known as the Stour Valley Railway, also nominally independent.

== Authorisation ==
Therefore, there were three railways proposing lines between Birmingham and Wolverhampton, and it was the Shrewsbury and Birmingham Railway which was persuaded to drop its section south of Wolverhampton. During the time in Parliament it agreed to omit that part of its scheme, relying on the Stour Valley Railway for the link between Wolverhampton and Birmingham.

Birmingham, Wolverhampton and Dudley Railway Act 1846
- Act of Parliament
- Parliament of the United Kingdom
- Long title: An Act for making Railways from Birmingham to Wolverhampton and Dudley, to be called "The Birmingham, Wolverhampton, and Dudley Railway."
- Citation: 9 & 10 Vict. c. cccxv
- Territorial extent: United Kingdom

Dates
- Royal assent: 3 August 1846

Other legislation
- Relates to: Birmingham Canal Navigations Act 1835; Wyrley and Essington Canal Navigation Act 1840; Shrewsbury and Birmingham Railway Act 1846; Shrewsbury, Wolverhampton and South Staffordshire Junction Railway Act 1846

This left two lines between Birmingham and Wolverhampton, the BW&DR and the Stour Valley Railway. They were both authorised by Parliament on 3 August 1846 as the Birmingham, Wolverhampton and Dudley Railway Act 1846 (9 & 10 Vict. c. cccxv) and the Birmingham, Wolverhampton and Stour Valley Railway (Birmingham, Wolverhampton and Dudley Lines) Act 1846 (9 & 10 Vict. c. cccxxviii), together with the Birmingham and Oxford Junction Railway in the Birmingham and Oxford Junction Railway Act 1846 (9 & 10 Vict. c. cccxxxvii), and the Shrewsbury and Birmingham Railway in the Shrewsbury and Birmingham Railway Act 1846 (9 & 10 Vict. c. cccvii).

The BW&DR was to run from the site that became Snow Hill station in Birmingham to Priestfield, approaching Wolverhampton, where it would connect into the Oxford, Worcester and Wolverhampton Railway when that line was completed. The Birmingham and Oxford Junction Railway was authorised to build to the same location at Snow Hill. There would be a branch from West Bromwich to Dudley. However most of the Dudley branch, from Great Bridge onwards, was identical to part of a line proposed by the South Staffordshire Railway, also authorised on 3 August 1846, and it was to be left to the SSR to make that part of the line, with running powers for the BW&DR. If the SSR failed to make their line within three years, the BW&DR would be allowed to make it.

There were limitations on new broad gauge railways at this time, and the BW&DR line as authorised would have to be made on the narrow (standard) gauge. The authorised capital of the BW&DR was £700,000.

== Amalgamation proposed ==
Having got authorisation, the directors of the BW&DR and of the B&OR took stock of the situation, and recognising that they had an affinity, set about arranging amalgamation. In fact it was plain that amalgamation of both companies with the Great Western Railway itself would be advantageous, and negotiations on that basis took place, resulting in special shareholders' meetings of the three companies being planned for 4 December 1846.

On 7 November 1845 the L&BR, the GJR and others had amalgamated to form the London and North Western Railway. The LNWR pursued an aggressive policy against its rivals, and it saw the amalgamation as hostile to its interests. Some B&OJR shareholders objected to the intended amalgamation with the GWR, saying that negotiations with the LNWR would be worthwhile, and a procedural issue prevented the matter being finalised at the meeting.

At a resumed meeting on 14 January 1847, the sale to the GWR was confirmed, but the LNWR went to great lengths to subvert the decision in the B&OJR meetings. The Birmingham, Wolverhampton and Dudley Railway Amendment Act 1847 (10 & 11 Vict. c. cxlix) authorising the sale of the BW&DR to the Great Western Railway was passed in July 1847, and the act authorised the use of broad gauge track on the line. The B&OJR proposals could not be acted on for some time because of the LNWR shenanigans, until an appeal against judgment by the LNWR was rejected in January 1848. It took until 31 August 1848 for royal assent to be given in the Great Western Railway Act 1848 (11 & 12 Vict. c. clix) to the B&OJR part of the amalgamation, and the laying of broad gauge rails. Even then the Dudley branch was to be narrow (standard) gauge only.

The (proposed) BW&DR line was to join the (as yet unbuilt) OW&WR at Priestfield, but in 1850 the OW&WR became alienated from the GWR, and outright hostile in 1851. As the OW&WR had not yet made the Priestfield line, the GWR applied for powers to do so itself, but in the 1852 session when this was asked for, the Commons committee demurred, instead inserting heavy penalties into the Oxford, Worcester and Wolverhampton Railway (Extensions of Time) Act 1852 (15 & 16 Vict. c. cxlv) if the OW&WR failed to complete their line promptly. At the same time, the GWR also secured authorisation in the Great Western Railway (No. 2) Act 1852 (15 & 16 Vict. c. cxxxiii) of the Wolverhampton Railway, which would connect the OW&WR north of Wolverhampton with the Shrewsbury and Birmingham Railway, thereby gaining a through connection to it from Birmingham.

The S&BR had counted on using the Stour Valley Railway for southward access to Birmingham, but the LNWR had done all in its power to harm the S&BR, chiefly by gaining control of the construction of the Stour Valley Railway, and intentionally delaying its completion. This pushed the S&BR into the GWR camp, and the connection through the Wolverhampton Railway and the OW&WR to the Birmingham Wolverhampton and Dudley Railway proved to be a huge benefit.

Even then it was not until the Birmingham and Oxford, Birmingham, Dudley and Wolverhampton, and Great Western Railways Act 1853 (16 & 17 Vict. c. clxxv) that the GWR obtained statutory running powers over the OW&WR between Priestfield and Cannock Road Junction, where the Wolverhampton Railway started.

== Construction ==
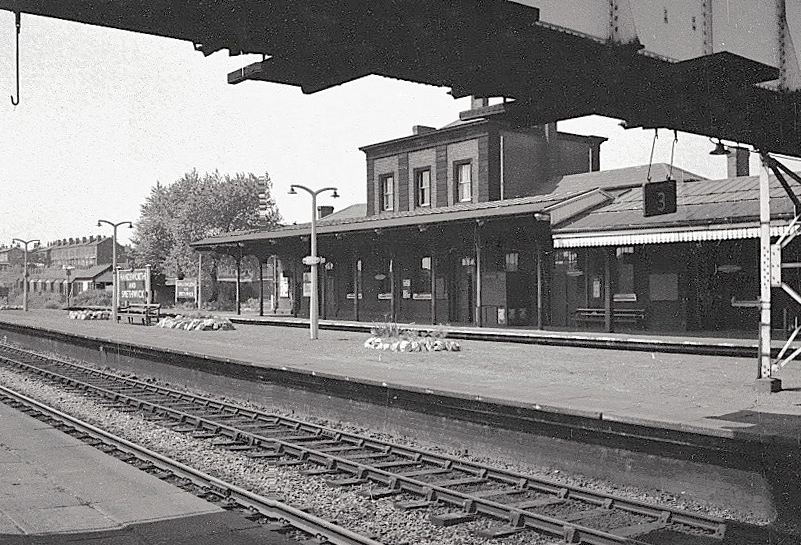
Handsworth and Smethwick station

Both the BW&DR and the B&OJR had now been absorbed by the Great Western Railway, and it was the larger company that set about construction, in 1851.

The line was considered ready in August 1854: by this time the OW&WR section onward from Priestfield was open. Captain Douglas Galton, the Board of Trade inspecting officer visited the line on 25 August 1854 but did not complete his inspection. The following day a wrought iron bridge over Winson Green Road collapsed. Isambard Kingdom Brunel visited and condemned five bridges designed by the local engineer. After replacement of the bridges and a reinspection, the line was passed, and opened on 14 November 1854, together with the Wolverhampton Railway.

Shrewsbury and Birmingham Railway trains were narrow gauge and worked into the OW&WR's Wolverhampton station; local trains were broad gauge. Goods stations on the BW&DR line were not made ready for a considerable time after this.

On 1 September 1854 the Shrewsbury and Birmingham Railway had been absorbed by the GWR. An earlier act of Parliament enabling running powers over the Stour Valley Railway stipulated that on this event taking place, the S&BR running powers would cease; however contrary to its previous policy of disrupting competitors, the LNWR as controller of the Stour Valley line allowed continued usage of the line until the (delayed) opening of the BW&DR.

== Connecting lines ==
The BW&DR connected Birmingham and Wolverhampton, and was a key link in the through route from London to Birkenhead. The Birmingham and Oxford Junction Railway provided the southward connection; Birkenhead was reached over the Shrewsbury and Birmingham Railway and its ally the Shrewsbury and Chester Railway, both soon also amalgamated with the GWR. At Chester the S&CR connected with the Birkenhead, Lancashire and Cheshire Junction Railway, in which the GWR acquired a half share. With running powers, the GWR had access to Liverpool and Manchester as well as Birkenhead.

The Dudley branch had been cut back in the original BW&DR authorisation, to merely reach the South Staffordshire Railway's line, with running powers over it on to Dudley. The South Staffordshire Railway had to complete their line to Dudley within three years or the BW&DR could take it over; they did so, but it was a close run thing.

Construction of the connecting line was much delayed, but the GWR opened it from Swan Village to Horseley Fields Junction on 1 September 1866. There was one intermediate station at Great Bridge.

The Stourbridge Railway opened its line from Old Hill to Smethwick on 1 April 1867, and the GWR opened a short connecting line from Smethwick Junction to Handsworth Junction on the BW&DR line on the same day.

== Gauge conversion ==
For some time it had become increasingly obvious that the continuation of the broad gauge was limited. The importance of the Birkenhead traffic, carried on the narrow (standard) gauge Shrewsbury lines emphasised this; the GWR installed mixed gauge track right into Paddington station, and Birkenhead trains ran narrow gauge throughout.

From then it was only a matter of time, and at length the GWR decided to convert the entire system progressively. The BW&DR and nearby lines were converted to standard gauge only on 1 April 1869, although the passenger service had been purely narrow gauge from 1 November 1864.

== Passenger train services ==
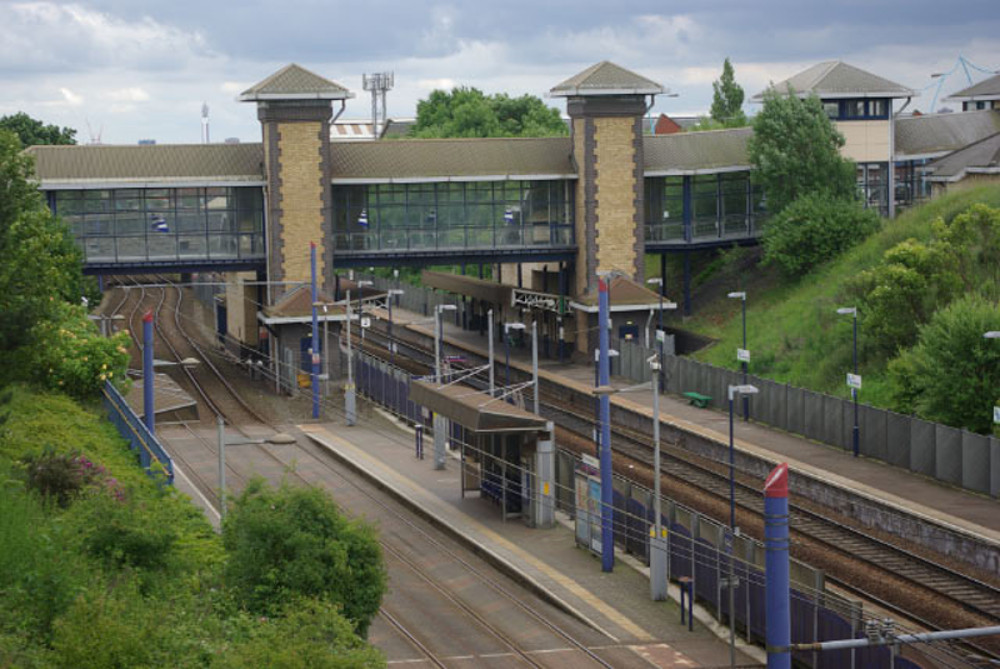
The Hawthorns station

In 1895 there were 21 local passenger services each way every weekday on the BW&DR main line, as well as five long distance expresses; in addition there were 23 weekday passenger trains leaving Snow Hill for Stourbridge Junction or Dudley. Three South Wales Express trains left Snow Hill and ran via Stourbridge Junction.

By 1960 the train service included numerous long-distance trains from London and the South-west to locations in the north and in West Wales. The Monday to Friday service was busy, but the summer Saturday service was much enhanced with trains to and from holiday destinations. On Saturdays between 12:00 and 13:00 northbound trains left Snow Hill at:

- 12:00 Bewdley stopping;
- 12:15 Stourbridge Junction;
- 12:18 Dudley;
- 12:35 Aberystwyth Express;
- 12:35 Wellington stopping;
- 12:45 Cardiff via Kidderminster;
- 12:45 Kidderminster slow;
- 12:50 Wolverhampton; and
- 12:55 Dudley. (Note: The two instances of simultaneous fast and stopping train departures indicate that the quadruple track was being used.)

== After 1923 ==
The main line railways of Great Britain were "grouped" in 1923 following the Railways Act 1921. The Great Western Railway, with other smaller constituents formed one of the new four groups. The LNWR and the Midland Railway formed the new London, Midland and Scottish Railway.

In 1948 the railways were nationalised by government order, after the Transport Act 1947. At first the 1923 structure was maintained, with a London Midland Region (of British Railways) operating the old LMS lines and a Western Region the former GWR. This maintained costly duplication, but it took until January 1963 for the situation to be rationalised. The London Midland Region took over the former GWR lines.

On 15 June 1964 the Dudley to Birmingham Snow Hill passenger service was closed.

== Further closures ==
The Stafford – Wolverhampton – Birmingham line was electrified in 1966; between Wolverhampton and Birmingham the route selected for this modernisation was the Stour Valley Railway. The Paddington to Birkenhead trunk passenger route was ended in 1967, and all through traffic was transferred from the GWR lines to the former LNWR route.

The line from Birmingham Snow Hill to Wolverhampton continued to carry a sparse local passenger service. As losses increased it was obvious this service could not go on, an on 6 March 1972 the passenger service was withdrawn.

Two short stubs for freight purposes were the only remaining part of the BW&DR. Until 1982 Swan Village coal depot was served by trains that used the spur line from the South Staffordshire line to Wednesbury, where they reversed. A single line northwards from Wednesbury led to Wolverhampton steel terminal at Monmore Green; this continued until May 1983.

== Reopening ==
After a period of dormancy, part of the line was reopened. In September 1995 as part of the Jewellery Line scheme, the track was reinstated as far as the former Handsworth Junction, and on to Smethwick Junction with the spur from the Stour Valley Line. This gave a more satisfactory link to the Stourbridge line from Snow Hill.

On 31 May 1999 the line through to Priestfield was reopened to tram services as part of the Midland Metro scheme (West Midlands Metro from 2018). The trams run through to Wolverhampton, but beyond Priestfield they leave the former railway route, due to housing development on the former trackbed there. The tram lines run alongside the heavy rail section from Snow Hill to Handsworth Junction; the line had formerly been quadrupled at that point.

== Topography ==
=== Main line ===
- Birmingham; opened by GWR (Birmingham and Oxford Junction Railway) 1 October 1852; renamed Birmingham Snow Hill 1858; closed 6 March 1972; reopened 5 October 1987; still open;
- Jewellery Quarter; opened 25 September 1995; still open;
- Hockley; opened 14 November 1854; closed 6 March 1972;
- Soho; opened 14 November 1854; renamed Soho & Winson Green 1893; renamed Winson Green 1965; closed 6 March 1972;
- Handsworth & Smethwick; opened 14 November 1854; closed 6 March 1972;
- Handsworth Junction; divergence of line to Dudley, 1964 – 1993;
- The Hawthorns; football use at first; open 25 December 1931; last used 27 April 1968; reopened 25 September 1995; still open;
- West Bromwich; opened 14 November 1854; closed 6 March 1972;
- Swan Village; divergence of Dudley branch; opened 14 November 1854; closed 6 March 1972;
- Wednesbury; opened 14 November 1854; renamed Wednesbury Central 1950; renamed Wednesbury 1968; closed 6 March 1972;
- Wednesbury Junction; convergence of spur from South Staffordshire line; 1859 -
- Bradley & Moxley; opened 10 June 1862; closed 1 May 1915;
- Bilston; opened 14 November 1854; renamed Bilston Central 1950; closed 6 March 1972;
- Priestfield; OW&WR station; opened 5 July 1854; BW&DR line services 2 July 1855; closed 6 March 1972.

=== Dudley branch ===
- Swan Village; above;
- Great Bridge; opened 1 September 1866; closed 29 November 1915; reopened 1 May 1920; renamed Great Bridge South 1950; closed 15 June 1964;
- Horseley Fields Junction; convergence with South Staffordshire Line.
