= Birmingham and Oxford Junction Railway =

Overview
- Status: Historical
- Owner: Great Western Railway
- Locale: South East England; East Midlands; West Midlands
- Termini: Millstream Junction, Oxford; Birmingham Snow Hill, Birmingham

Service
- Type: Rural
- System: Great Western Railway
- Operator: Great Western Railway

History
- Opened: 1850 (Oxford to Banbury); 1852 (Banbury to Birmingham)

Technical
- Number of tracks: 1–2
- Track gauge: 7 ft 1/4 in (2,140 mm) and Mixed gauge (with 4 ft 8 1/2 in or 1,435 mm standard gauge)

The Birmingham and Oxford Junction Railway was an English railway line promoted by the Great Western Railway to gain a route from its southern base towards the industrial centres of the West Midlands, and in due course the north-west. It overtook another GWR subsidiary, the unbuilt Oxford and Rugby Railway, and the Birmingham Extension Railway which was to build a new independent station in the city. It was authorised in 1846 and formed a single project to connect Birmingham and Oxford.

The Great Western Railway used the broad gauge at the time; the rival narrow (standard) gauge London and North Western Railway used dubious tactics to retain the West Midlands in its own monopoly. Nevertheless, the line was opened throughout in 1852. It quickly became the springboard for the anticipated expansion to the Lancashire industrial areas. However the broad gauge was not permitted to be extended north of Wolverhampton, and this proved to be the seed of the end of the broad gauge.

The route became an important corridor for express passenger trains and heavy freight flows. In 1910 the Bicester cut-off was opened, shortening the journey to the north by avoiding the route by way of Oxford. When the West Coast Main Line was electrified in the 1960s, the former GWR route declined substantially, renamed as the Chiltern Main Line, it revived in the 1980s and now carries an excellent train service to rival the West Coast Main Line.

== Origin ==
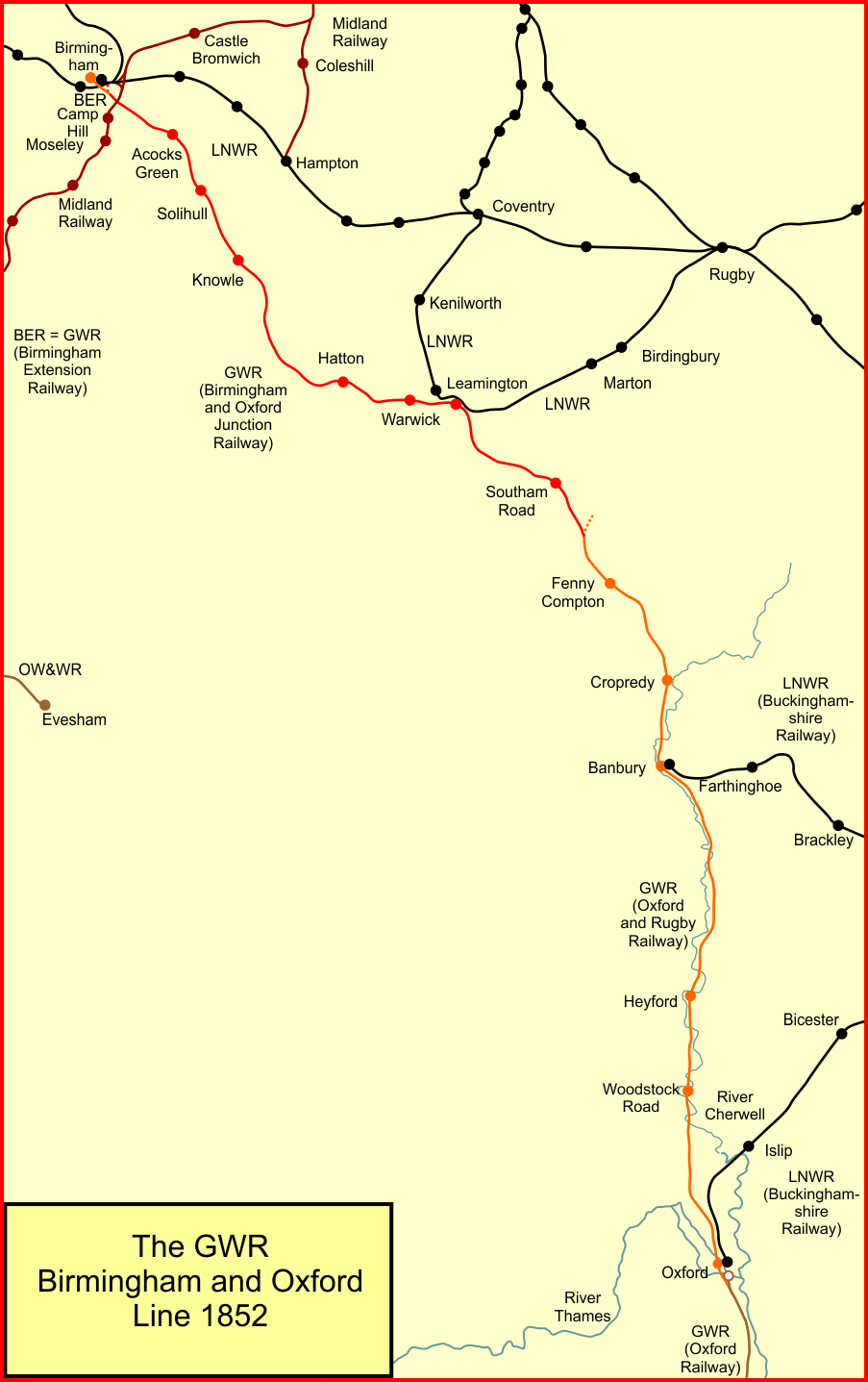
The Birmingham and Oxford line in 1852

In the mid-1840s the Great Western Railway wanted to build a railway line from Oxford northwards. It did so by promoting subsidiary companies; in particular the Oxford and Rugby Railway, and the Birmingham and Oxford Junction Railway.

Through the agency of the Oxford Railway, it had opened a line from Didcot, on the Great Western Railway main line, to Oxford, opening on 12 June 1844. The Oxford terminus was immediately south of the river, near Folly Bridge, in what is now Marlborough Road. The capital was put up by directors of the GWR, with no independent shareholders, and the company was quickly absorbed by the GWR. At the time Rugby was an important hub for traffic to and from the northern districts of England; the Midland Counties Railway and the London and Birmingham Railway connected there, and formed the only route to the north.

The Oxford and Rugby Railway was conceived to enable the GWR to connect the southern areas it served into the northwards network. It would run from a junction with the Oxford Railway line south of Oxford, with a new through Oxford station nearer to the centre of the city, through Banbury and Fenny Compton to a junction at Rugby. The Oxford and Rugby Railway Act 1845 (8 & 9 Vict. c. clxxxviii) was given royal assent on 4 August 1845. Broad gauge was authorised, but mixed gauge would have to be provided if required by the Board of Trade.

Early in 1845 the Grand Junction Railway projected a line from their Birmingham terminus to join the Oxford Railway at Oxford. The Grand Junction Railway was dependent on the London and Birmingham Railway for access to London, and there was considerable friction between the two companies; an Oxford line would get to London without involving the L&BR. The Great Western Railway too found the L&BR a difficult trading partner, and gave the GJR scheme its support. The GWR and the Oxford Railway were broad gauge, and the new line would be broad too; indeed the GJR prepared estimates for converting its own network to the broad gauge.

The GJR observed that the Oxford and Rugby Railway scheme was successful in Parliament, and they altered their own proposal to join the O&RR line at Knightcote, north of Fenny Compton, shortening the necessary construction. However, soon afterwards, the hostility between GJR and the L&BR suddenly abated, and they became allies; the GJR summarily resiled from the agreements it had made with the GWR. The GJR and the L&BR, together with the Manchester and Birmingham Railway, amalgamated to form the London and North Western Railway on 16 July 1846.

== The GWR steps in ==
Birmingham and Oxford Junction Railway Act 1846
- Act of Parliament
- Parliament of the United Kingdom
- Long title: An Act for making a Railway from Birmingham, to join the Lines of the proposed Oxford and Rugby and Oxford, Worcester, and Wolverhampton Railways, and to be called "The Birmingham and Oxford Junction Railway."
- Citation: 9 & 10 Vict. c. cccxxxvii

Dates
- Royal assent: 3 August 1846

Birmingham and Oxford Junction Railway (Birmingham Extension Railway) Act 1846
- Act of Parliament
- Parliament of the United Kingdom
- Long title: An Act for making a Railway into Birmingham in extension of the proposed Birmingham and Oxford Junction Railway.
- Citation: 9 & 10 Vict. c. cccxxxviii

Dates
- Royal assent: 3 August 1846

The GWR and the other parties interested in the line decided to proceed anyway, and the scheme became known as the Birmingham and Oxford Junction Railway. As the earlier scheme had presumed the use of the Grand Junction's Curzon Street station in Birmingham, an additional bill was prepared, for the Birmingham Extension Railway, a short line from Bordesley to the central station that later became known as Snow Hill station. The London and Birmingham Railway had resorted to a series of spoiling tactics intended to undermine the case for the line, but after a struggle, royal assent was given to the Birmingham and Oxford Junction Railway Act 1846 (9 & 10 Vict. c. cccxxxvii), and to the Birmingham and Oxford Junction Railway (Birmingham Extension Railway) Act 1846 (9 & 10 Vict. c. cccxxxviii), on 3 August 1846. Capital was to be £1 million for the two railways combined; the Birmingham and Oxford Junction Railway (Birmingham Extension Railway) Act 1846 authorised the station scheme, and directed that the extension should immediately be amalgamated with the B&OJR.

In fact sixteen railway bills were passed that day; (Note: There were 435 railway bills in the 1846 session as a whole.) two of them for railways between Birmingham and Wolverhampton: the Birmingham, Wolverhampton and Stour Valley Railway, which was soon to fall into LNWR hands, and the Birmingham, Wolverhampton and Dudley Railway, later to be a GWR offshoot. In addition there was a Shrewsbury and Birmingham Railway, which was in fact to construct no further south than Wolverhampton.

It was evident that amalgamation with the GWR by the B&OJR as well as the Birmingham, Wolverhampton and Dudley Railway was advantageous. Some shareholders of the B&OJR objected on the grounds that better terms might be secured from the LNWR. However, after considerable procedural difficulties, the amalgamation was approved by the Great Western Railway Act 1848 (11 & 12 Vict. c. clix). It was formalised on 2 January 1847.

At this the LNWR faction attempted to subvert the whole affair, at first by acquiring large numbers of B&OJR shares, buying them at a premium. They were thereby able to win votes at shareholders' meetings. A forged common seal of the company was procured, and numerous procedural devices were attempted. At length in January 1848 the matter was found in the GWR's favour in the Court of Chancery, and the LNWR finally acquiesced. The amalgamation was settled, and the line from Fenny Compton to Wolverhampton was to be built by the GWR.

== The gauge question ==
The furore was well publicised, and it moved the House of Lords to order the Railway Commissioners to consider the gauge question. It was obvious that a through railway from London to Birmingham ought not to have an avoidable break of gauge, but the whole question was reopened. This issue was now debated inconclusively, but on 31 August 1848 the amalgamation bill was passed and mixed gauge was authorised.

== LNWR prevarication ==
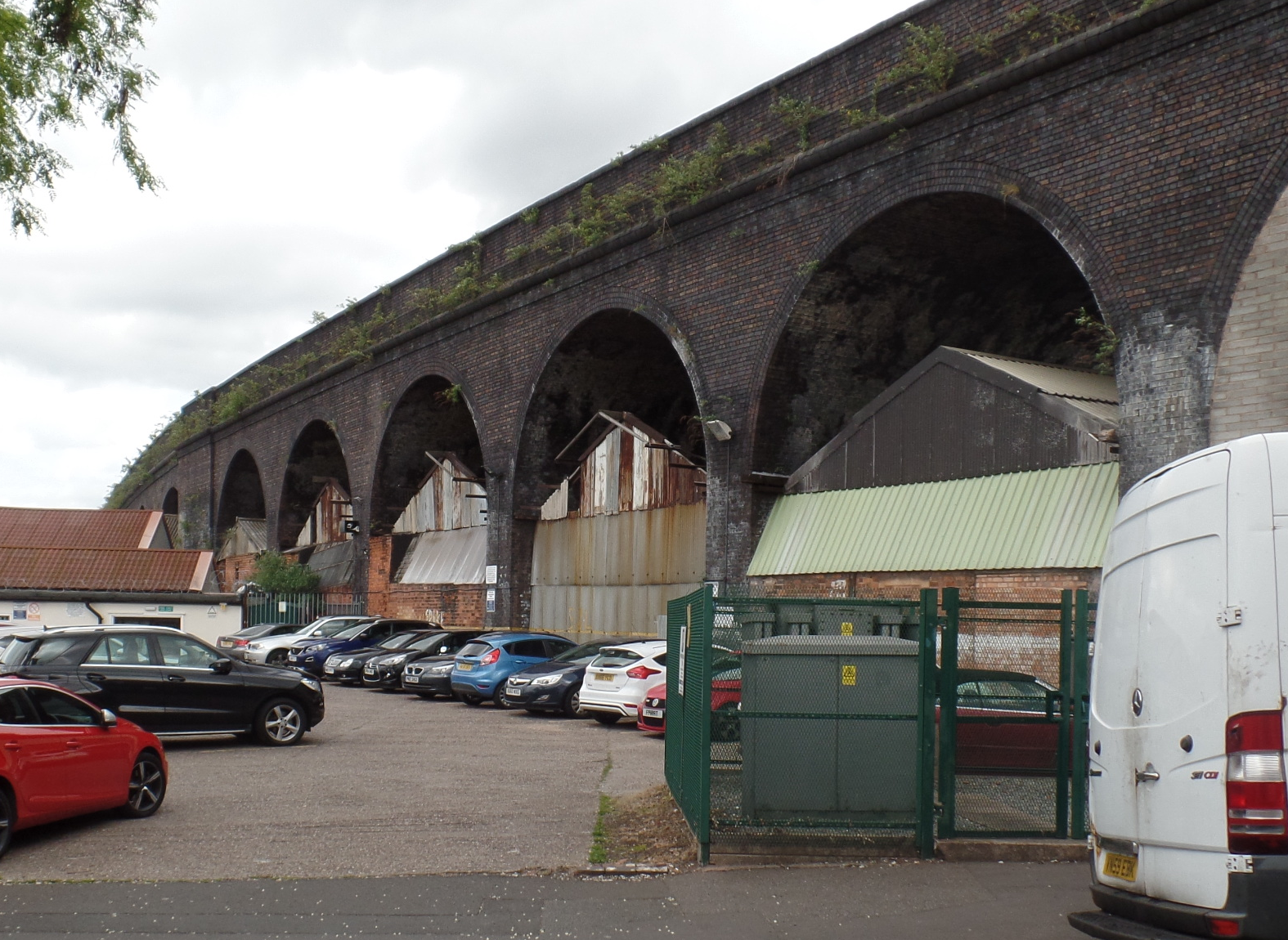
Duddeston Viaduct, which never carried a train

The GWR line was required to make a narrow (standard) gauge connection with the LNWR on the south side of Birmingham. The original authorisation of the B&OJR was to terminate at Curzon Street, but the LNWR was now vacating that station and extending the line approaching it into the centre of Birmingham, in order to reach the station that was later named New Street. The LNWR would not allow the GWR to make the mandatory connection into that line, fearing that the GWR would make advantageous use of the Stour Valley Line, and insisted on completion of the original connection to Curzon Street, although that was now useless. Nevertheless, as matters proceeded the LNWR realised this must involve a flat crossing of their Birmingham (New Street) extension line, and they objected to the GWR connection entering their property, although they had demanded it. The GWR meanwhile constructed the necessary viaduct up to the property boundary; in fact work on it was still progressing when the line into Snow Hill opened. The connection on the viaduct was not wanted by either company and never carried track or trains. (Note: The 1905 Ordnance Survey plan at Six Inches to One Mile, sheet XIV:NW revised 1902 to 1903 shows a spur siding on the first part of the viaduct.) MacDermot commented:

And so the derelict Duddeston Viaduct or most of it still stands, a melancholy monument to the ill-conditioned spite of a great Railway Company against a victorious rival in the old fighting days.

The viaduct still stands as of 2025.

In 1846 the Oxford and Rugby Railway was absorbed into the GWR.

On 31 August 1848 the Great Western Railway Act 1848 (11 & 12 Vict. c. clix) was passed authorising the absorption of the B&OJR and the Birmingham Extension Railway, and the laying of mixed gauge track on it. The entire route from Millstream Junction, south of Oxford, to the future Snow Hill station in Birmingham, as well as the Birmingham, Wolverhampton and Dudley Railway, were now in GWR hands.

== Construction ==
Work had started on the Oxford and Rugby line in 1845, but there was a delay in getting possession of the necessary land; then the contractor proved unsatisfactory, and work was in abeyance for some time. By August 1849 it had been decided that the Oxford and Rugby powers would only be used as far as Fenny Compton, and that the Rugby part of the powers would be abandoned. The company obtained Board of Trade permission to open a single line to Banbury on the broad gauge only, as for the time being no narrow gauge line connected with it. The Board of Trade were cowed by an angry response from the LNWR demanding that the useless third rail should be provided, but the GWR held out.

The line between Oxford and Banbury was opened as a broad gauge single line on 2 September 1850; the formation was made for double track. As yet there was no station at Oxford on the line, and trains reversed at Millstream Junction and used the Oxford Railway terminus. Work started on construction of the B&OJR part of the line in 1847, the contractors Peto and Betts being employed. Money was very short and the work was delayed on that account. The portion of the Oxford and Rugby Railway as far as Fenny Compton was being proceeded with. There was to be a new station at Oxford.

Captain Douglas Galton of the Board of Trade visited the line for the statutory inspection of the line for passenger operation on 14 September 1852. He was satisfied with the line in general, but the final short section into Snow Hill, and the Duddeston Viaduct, were not ready, and he declined to approve those last sections. The shortcoming was rectified and the line into Snow Hill was approved on 28 September 1852. The line was opened to the public throughout from Oxford to Birmingham on 1 October 1852, as a mixed gauge double track.

The connecting Birmingham, Wolverhampton and Dudley Railway opened on 14 November 1854, connecting through the short Wolverhampton Railway with the Shrewsbury and Birmingham Railway.

== Gauge conversion ==
As it moved north, the GWR acquired narrow (standard) gauge lines, the Shrewsbury and Birmingham Railway and the Shrewsbury and Chester Railway. It considered running broad gauge trains throughout to Birkenhead, but the idea was frustrated early on. The GWR obtained running powers to Birkenhead, Liverpool and Birmingham, and shortly afterwards a half share in the Birkenhead, Lancashire and Cheshire Junction Railway. This considerable expansion of business in narrow gauge territory made the broad gauge gradually untenable, and after considerable reflection the GWR abolished it north of Oxford on 1 April 1869.

== Connecting lines ==
The Birmingham to Oxford line was an important trunk route running through prosperous farming and manufacturing areas, and naturally there were a number of connecting lines and branches, shown here in geographical order north to south:

=== North Warwickshire Line ===
At Tyseley, the North Warwickshire line diverged, heading to Stratford-upon-Avon, joining the existing Stratford branch at Bearley Junction. The line opened in 1907 to goods and to passengers the following year. It had been promoted by a local company, but taken over by the GWR. In the past it has served as a secondary main line route, but since about 1970 it has become chiefly a residential passenger branch line, and is still (2019) in use.

=== Henley-in-Arden branch ===
At Rowington Junction near Lapworth, the branch diverged to Henley-in-Arden, opening in 1894. The need for the branch ceased when the North Warwickshire Line was opened, serving Henley-in-Arden intermediately. The branch closed in 1915 when track materials were taken for the war effort in France.

=== Stratford-upon-Avon branch ===
At Hatton, there is a triangular junction serving the Stratford-on-Avon branch. It opened in 1860 from the south, using Leamington as the railhead for the branch. The north curve was opened in 1897.

=== Leamington ===
At Leamington, the London and Birmingham Railway already had a terminus of a branch line from Coventry, opened in 1844. The stations were separate. In 1851 the LNWR (which had been formed when the L&BR amalgamated with others) made a branch from Rugby, running to the L&BR station.

There was a connection between the routes made in 1864 allowing through running from the GWR station towards Coventry, and this was modified in 1966. The connection and the line to Coventry are in use at the present day. There was also a connection from the GWR station towards Rugby, opened in 1908, and closed in 1961. The former LNWR Rugby line closed in 1966.

=== Fenny Compton ===
The Stratford-upon-Avon and Midland Junction Railway crossed the GWR main line obliquely at Fenny Compton, running alongside it for some distance, but there was no connection. However, in 1960 a junction was installed providing a shorter route for iron ore trains from Banbury to South Wales than the former route by way of Leamington.

Although almost all of the SoA&MJR has closed, a short stub has been retained to serve MoD Kineton, a Defence Munitions base, using the 1960 connection.

=== Banbury Junction ===
The Great Central Railway built its London Extension (Note: Strictly speaking this was the London Extension of the Manchester, Sheffield and Lincolnshire Railway, which changed its name to the Great Central Railway.) and it opened a connection from Woodford Halse in 1900. There was considerable co-operation between the GWR and the GCR over through passenger services, some of which used this connection.

=== Aynho Junction ===
Aynho Junction was the divergence of the Bicester cut-off, below.

=== Blenheim branch ===
A branch line was built to serve the Duke of Marlborough's seat; it opened in 1890 and closed in 1954.

=== Oxford, Worcester and Wolverhampton Railway ===
The OW&WR main line was authorised at the same time as the B&OJR and opened in 1853. It remains open at the present day (2019).

=== The LNWR at Oxford ===
The Buckinghamshire Railway, controlled by the LNWR, opened a line to its own Oxford station in 1851. The line was extended eastwards, becoming the Oxford to Cambridge Line. During World War II this was planned to be part of a freight diversionary route avoiding London, and a connection was laid in from the Bicester direction into the GWR Oxford line.

== The Bicester cut-off ==
In 1910 the GWR opened a cut-off line, that ran directly from London to Banbury and cut nearly 19 miles from the distance to Banbury. The Oxford to Banbury section naturally continued in use, but the new line took the majority of the through trains. A grade-separated junction was provided at Aynho, where the two northward routes converge.

== Train services after 1919 ==
The line's status as the North Main Line continued in the twentieth century. There were heavy freight flows, and the line was an important trunk passenger route. Semmens shows eleven daily express services between Paddington and Wolverhampton in 1922, including three by the "old route" via Oxford. Some of the down trains slipped coaches at Oxford or Banbury. One train ran via Ealing Broadway, making a call there, and then ran non-stop to Birmingham. There were also long-distance trains from Portsmouth, Bournemouth and Dover, all travelling via Oxford. By 1939 there was one additional train between London and Birmingham. The Birkenhead trains were shown as making connections for the Isle of Man, or Belfast overnight. Four trains covered the London to Birmingham journey in two hours.

== Banbury hump yard ==
In 1931 a large hump marshalling yard was built at Banbury; it was with government financial assistance under the Development (Loan Guarantees and Grants) Act 1929 (20 & 21 Geo. 5. c. 7). It was on the up side of the line between Banbury Junction (where the GCR Woodford Halse line joined) and Banbury station. The hump yard had 19 sidings and was capable of holding 1,400 wagons.

== 1933 quadrupling ==
In the first years of the twentieth century the GWR had quadrupled the line between Birmingham Moor Street and Olton. In 1933 the quadruple track was extended to Lapworth; 33 bridges and five stations were reconstructed as part of the work.

== Leamington Spa station and others ==
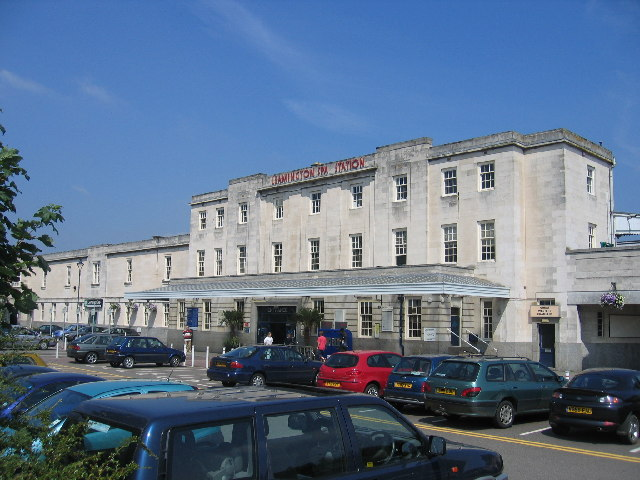
Leamington Spa station

The original 1854 Leamington Spa station was cramped and unsatisfactory, and in 1938 it was reconstructed in Art Deco style. Christiansen recorded in 1981 that

Those who knew the striking, white Leamington Spa station at the time of its creation in 1938, with its walnut veneered waiting rooms, windows edged with stainless steel, and the long wide and widely separated up and down platforms outside, will find it virtually untouched today.

Banbury station was reconstructed in the years following 1945; Christiansen did not find that so attractive. Oxford station was subject to "continuous station change" and the new station was opened in 1972. It has a "pre-fab" appearance.

== 1960s decline ==
In the 1960s the general decline in railway passenger and goods traffic struck the line with some force. British Railways rationalised much of the duplication of lines in the greater Birmingham area, and this seemed to attack the former GWR lines in particular.

In the first half of the 1960s main line electrification work on the West Coast Main Line was in progress, and for a while this involved enhanced express trains on the Paddington to Birmingham line (to reduce traffic on the lines under development). However, in 1966 the work was substantially completed between London and Birmingham, and main line express trains were transferred to that line. These two factors almost wiped out Snow Hill station and in 1968 it was all but closed, and on 4 March the southern approach to Snow Hill was actually closed. Moor Street station became the northern terminus of the residual GWR services from the south.

== Regeneration ==
In 1987 Snow Hill station and the connection to Moor Street was reopened, and Leamington and Stratford-upon-Avon services were diverted back to the route. In 1993 through trains from London Marylebone via Bicester and Leamington Spa were introduced. In the spirit of the times, these were marketed as a cheaper and lower quality alternative to the Euston main line trains, branded The Chiltern Line. The service proved commercially attractive, and led to successful privatisation in 1996. Infrastructure improvements enabled enhanced journey times and frequencies, and the line became an equal competitor with the Euston services.

== Other train services ==
The opening of Birmingham International station in 1976 led to a demand for passenger train calls on cross country routes. The line between Coventry and Leamington Spa was reopened to passenger trains in 1977, and carries trains from Manchester to the south of England, which use the route Birmingham International – Coventry – Leamington Spa – Oxford. Certain freightliner trains to and from Southampton follow the same routing.

== Location list ==
The entire line was built by the Great Western Railway, but it was authorised in three sections:

=== Birmingham Extension Railway ===
- Birmingham; opened 1 October 1852; renamed Birmingham Snow Hill 1858; closed 6 March 1972; reopened 5 October 1987; still open;
- Moor Street; opened 1 July 1909; through station 28 September 1987; still open;

=== Birmingham and Oxford Junction Railway ===
- Bordesley; opened June 1855; relocated southwards 7 March 1915; still open;
- Small Heath & Sparkbrook; opened April 1863; still open;
- Tyseley; opened 1 October 1906; still open;
- Acocks Green; opened June 1853; sometimes known as Acocks Green and South Yardley; still open;
- Olton; opened January 1869; still open;
- Solihull; opened 1 October 1852; still open;
- Widney Manor; opened 1 July 1899; still open;
- Knowle; opened 1 October 1852; renamed Knowle and Dorridge 1899; renamed Knowle 1968; renamed Dorridge 1974; still open;
- Kingswood opened October 1854; renamed Lapworth 1902; still open;
- Hatton; opened 1 October 1852; still open;
- Warwick; opened 1 October 1852; still open;
- Leamington; opened 1 October 1852; renamed Leamington Spa 1913; still open;
- Harbury; opened 1 October 1852; renamed Southam Road and Harbury unknown date; closed 2 November 1964;

=== Oxford and Rugby Railway ===
- Fenny Compton; opened 1 October 1852; closed 2 November 1964;
- Cropredy; opened 1 October 1852; closed 17 September 1956;
- Banbury Junction; convergence of Great Central line from Woodford Halse 1900 – 1966;
- Banbury; opened 2 September 1850; sometimes name Banbury General; still open;
- Kings Sutton; opened 1 June 1872; still open;
- Aynho Junction; divergence of Bicester cut-off line to London;
- Aynho; opened 2 September 1850; closed 2 November 1964;
- Somerton; opened April 1854; renamed Fritwell and Somerton 1907; closed 2 November 1964;
- Heyford; opened 2 September 1850; still open;
- Tackley; opened 6 April 1932; still open;
- Woodstock; opened 2 September 1850; renamed Woodstock Road 1851; renamed Kirtlington 1855; renamed Bletchington 1890; closed 2 November 1964;
- Woodstock Road; opened 1 June 1855; renamed Kidlington 1890; closed 2 November 1964;
- Wolvercot; opened 1 February 1908; renamed Wolvercot Platform 1912; closed 1 January 1916;
- Oxford; opened 1 October 1852; still open;
- Millstream Junction; convergence with Oxford Railway.
