= Wolverhampton Temporary railway station =

Former railway station in England

General information
- Location: Wolverhampton, Wolverhampton; England
- Coordinates: 52.588762°N 2.121800°W
- Grid reference: SO918990
- Platforms: 1

Other information
- Status: Disused

History
- Pre-grouping: Shrewsbury and Birmingham Railway

Key dates
- 1849: Opened
- 1852: Closed to passengers
- 1970: The station building was demolished
Location

Wolverhampton Temporary railway station was a station was the eastern terminus of the Shrewsbury and Birmingham Railway from 1849 to 1852.

The station opened on 12 November 1849 as a temporary terminus for the S&B after they were given rights to run trains over the Birmingham, Wolverhampton and Stour Valley Railway (BW&SV). It closed on 24 June 1852, after Wolverhampton High Level opened just to the south. The station buildings were demolished in the 1970s.

Preceding station	Historical railways	Following station
Terminus	Shrewsbury and Birmingham Railway; Wolverhampton–Shrewsbury line	Stafford Road
