= Bebington railway station =

Railway station on the Chester & Ellesmere Port branches of the Wirral line in England

Bebington
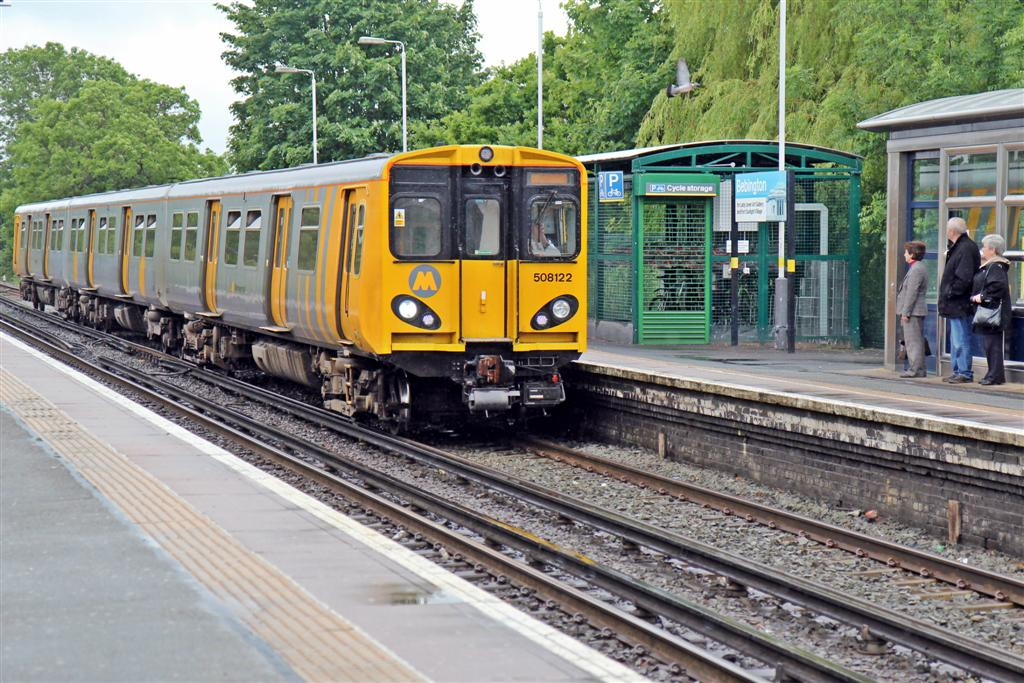
- A Merseyrail Class 508 at Bebington.

General information
- Location: Bebington, Wirral; England
- Coordinates: 53°21′27″N 3°00′11″W
- Grid reference: SJ333850
- Manager: Merseyrail
- Transit authority: Merseytravel
- Platforms: 2

Other information
- Station code: BEB
- Fare zone: B1
- Classification: DfT category E

Passengers
- 2021/22: ▲0.678 million
- 2022/23: ▲0.750 million
- 2023/24: ▲0.806 million
- 2024/25: ▲0.918 million
- 2025/26: ▲1.009 million
Location
Notes
- Passenger statistics from the Office of Rail and Road

Bebington railway station serves the town of Bebington in Merseyside, England and opened on Monday 23rd. September 1840. The station is situated on the Chester and Ellesmere Port branches of the Wirral Line, forming part of the Merseyrail network.

== History ==
The station is on the former Chester and Birkenhead Railway, opening in 1840 as Bebington before being renamed 'Bebington and New Ferry' on 1 May 1895.

The name was changed back to just Bebington on 6 May 1974.

Direct train services to Liverpool began in 1985, when the line between Rock Ferry and Hooton was electrified; previously passengers for Liverpool had to change at Rock Ferry. Further electrification in the early-1990s allowed electric train services to be extended, first to Chester in 1993 and then Ellesmere Port in 1994.

In June 2014 it was announced that the station would be among a small number across the Merseyrail network that would be renovated as part of a £3.7m programme of improvements, namely refurbishment and improvement of passenger areas, lighting and CCTV coverage. Between February and March 2015, the subway leading to Platform 1 was refurbished. An electronic information board was also added at the street entrance.

== Facilities ==
The station is staffed during all opening hours and has platform CCTV. There is a payphone, a vending machine and a booking office. There are live departure and arrival screens on the platform, for passenger information. Each of the two platforms has sheltered seating. The station has a free car park, with 24 spaces and also a cycle locker with 25 spaces. Access to the station and both platforms is by ramp, allowing easy access for passengers with wheelchairs or prams.

== Services ==
Trains operate every 15 minutes between Chester and Liverpool on weekdays and Saturdays, until late evening when the service becomes half-hourly, as it is on Sundays. Additionally there is a half-hourly service between Liverpool and Ellesmere Port all day, every day. Northbound trains operate via Birkenhead Hamilton Square station in Birkenhead and the Mersey Railway Tunnel to Liverpool. Southbound trains all proceed as far as Hooton, where the lines to Chester and Ellesmere Port divide. These services are all provided by Merseyrail's fleet of Class 777 EMUs.

Preceding station	National Rail	Following station
Port Sunlight towards Chester or Ellesmere Port	Merseyrail; Wirral Line; Ellesmere Port/Chester	Rock Ferry; Liverpool Central
	Historical railways	
Port Sunlight; Line and station open	GWR & LNWR; Chester and Birkenhead Railway	Rock Lane; Line open, station closed
