= Tranmere railway station =

Former railway station in England

Tranmere

General information
- Location: Tranmere, Birkenhead, Cheshire; England
- Coordinates: 53.3754°N 3.0120°W
- Platforms: Two

Other information
- Status: Disused

History
- Opened: 30 May 1846
- Closed: October 1857
- Original company: Chester and Birkenhead Railway
Location

Tranmere was a railway station on the Chester and Birkenhead Railway in Cheshire, England. It opened in 1846 and closed in 1857 and consisted of two platforms (only one up to 1847).

It originally opened as Lime Kiln Lane and was later renamed as St. Paul's Road, finally changing to Tranmere in 1853. On 22 July 1847 the railway became part of the Birkenhead, Lancashire and Cheshire Junction Railway. The company doubled the track, which up to this time had been single track. This is the most likely time for the second platform to have been added.

in 1891, the Mersey Railway opened a double track extension, and at the same time, the Birkenhead and Chester line was quadrupled, destroying any evidence of the station site.

== References and further reading ==
- Subterranea Britannica's Page On Tranmere

Preceding station	Historical railways	Following station
Rock Lane; Line open, station closed	GWR & LNWR; Chester & Birkenhead Railway	Birkenhead Town; Line and station closed
