= Cathcart Street Goods railway station =

Former goods railway station on the Birkenhead Railway in Wirral, England

Cathcart Street Goods

General information
- Location: Birkenhead, Wirral; England
- Coordinates: 53.39985°N 3.02577°W
- Grid reference: SJ318897

Other information
- Status: Disused

History
- Original company: Chester and Birkenhead Railway
- Pre-grouping: LNWR/GWR joint
- Post-grouping: LMS/GWR joint

Key dates
- 5 April 1847: Opened as Bridge End
- 1855–1856: expanded
- by 1880: renamed as Cathcart Street
- 5 June 1961: Closed
Location

Cathcart Street Goods was a goods terminus in Birkenhead, England. It opened in 1847 and closed in 1961.

== History ==
The goods station opened as Bridge End on 5 April 1847, adjacent to the East Float dock complex, when the Chester and Birkenhead Railway (C&BR) opened its docks extension from Grange Lane. The extension was authorised in the Chester and Birkenhead Railway Act 1845 (8 & 9 Vict. c. xcix) which received royal assent on 21 July 1845.

On 22 July 1847 the C&BR was absorbed by the Birkenhead, Lancashire and Cheshire Junction Railway (BL&CJR).

The BL&CJR changed its name to the Birkenhead Railway (BR) on 1 August 1859, shortly before being acquired jointly by the London and North Western Railway (L&NWR) and Great Western Railway (GWR).

By 1855 the station needed enlarging to handle an increasing amount of traffic, the station re-opened in mid 1856, it was still known as Bridge End station at this time.

Greenwood (2007) notes that the station may have also been called East Float Goods station in 1857, when it doubled as a passenger station for emigrants to Australia, who were housed in the cellars while awaiting embarkation.

By 1880 the station had been renamed to Cathcart Street.

The station closed on 5 June 1961 although it had been moribund for some time before.

== Location ==
The station was located between Corporation Street and the East Float, to the east of Cathcart Street. Road access was by Cathcart Street on the west side.

== Description ==
The warehouse had two floors above ground and a loading basin for barges, entered by a larger brick arch.

There were a variety of cranes, particularly between the building and the dock, In the early days there was a coal tip which was given up in 1880 when the Mersey Docks and Harbour Board (MDHB) equipped Cavendish Wharf with hydraulic hoists for coal traffic.

The barge dock was filled in when the transshipment of railway goods by barge ended in 1922.

The Company offices were adjacent to the station on Cathcart Street. The offices were described as "a rabbit warren of dark, comfortless rooms reminiscent of the Dickens era" little was done to modernise them, during the 1930s electricity was provided in one room to power an accounting machine, elsewhere was still lit by gas.

== See also ==
- Mersey flat

== Sources ==
- Airey, John (1882). Railway Junction Diagrams.
- Grant, Donald J. (2017). Directory of the Railway Companies of Great Britain (1st ed.). Kibworth Beauchamp, Leicestershire: Troubador Publishing Ltd. ISBN 978-1-78803-768-6.
- Greenwood, Cedric (1 September 2007). Merseyside the Indian Summer:Return to Woodside : Birkenhead, the docks, the ferries. Vol. 1. Silver Link Publishing. ISBN 978-1-85794-272-9.
- Maund, T.B. (2000). The Birkenhead Railway (LMS & GW joint). RCTS. ISBN 9780901115874. OCLC 49815012.
- Ward, John C. (1857). Ward's Directory Of Birkenhead, Including Bidston, Egremont, New Brighton, Oxton, Rock Ferry, Seacombe, And Tranmere. p. 4.

Preceding station	Disused railways	Following station
Rock Ferry	Birkenhead Railway; Birkenhead Dock Branch	Terminus
