= Liverpool James Street railway station =

Underground railway station in Merseyside, England

Liverpool James Street
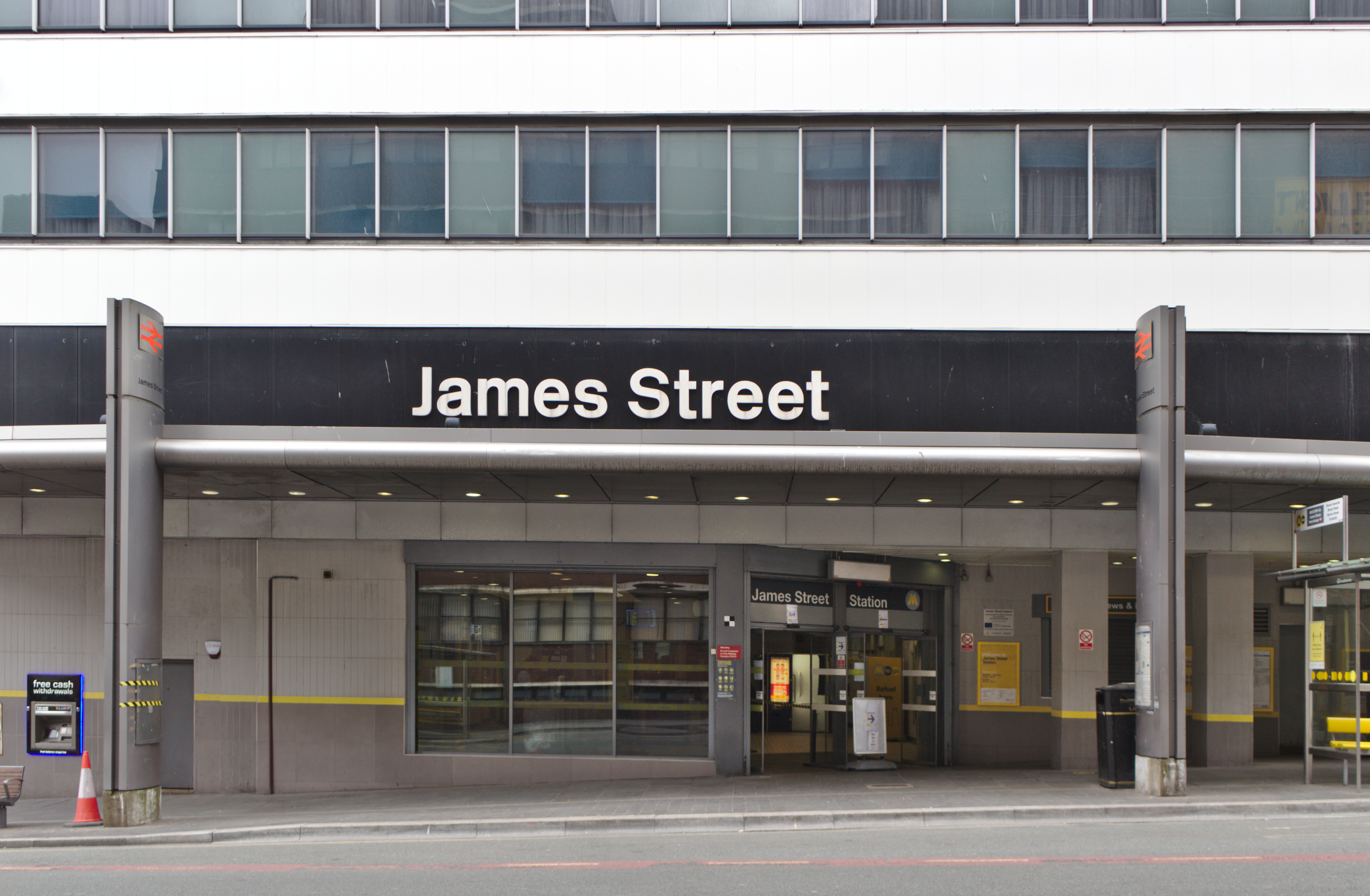
- James Street station entrance

General information
- Location: Liverpool, Metropolitan Borough of Liverpool, England
- Coordinates: 53.4048°N 2.9919°W
- Grid reference: SJ341902
- Manager: Merseyrail
- Transit authority: Merseytravel
- Platforms: 3 (only 2 see regular use)

Other information
- Station code: LVJ
- Fare zone: C1
- Classification: DfT category E

History
- Original company: Mersey Railway
- Pre-grouping: Mersey Railway
- Post-grouping: Mersey Railway, London Midland Region of British Railways

Key dates
- 1 February 1886: Opened

Passengers
- 2021/22: ▲2.263 million
- 2022/23: ▲2.400 million
- 2023/24: ▲2.655 million
- 2024/25: ▲3.120 million
- 2025/26: ▲3.418 million
Location
Notes
- Passenger statistics from the Office of Rail and Road

Liverpool James Street (or simply James Street) is a railway station located in the centre of Liverpool, in Merseyside, England; it is situated on the Wirral Line of the Merseyrail network. James Street is an underground station, with access to the platforms via lifts from the booking hall. At certain times, the platforms are accessed via a pedestrian tunnel from the India Buildings on Water Street. As of 2013/14, James Street was the fifth-busiest station on the Merseyrail network.

== History ==
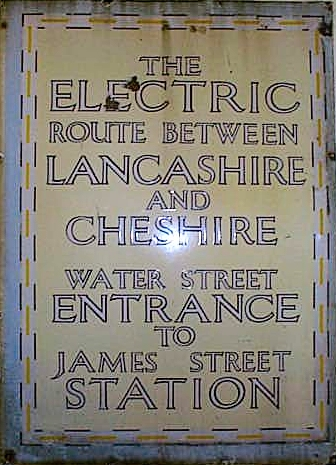
Water Street entrance sign for James Street station from just after electrification of the Mersey Railway

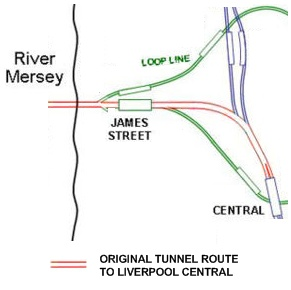
Platform and tunnel layout in and around James Street station, including the original tunnel to Central station which is extant

The station opened as the original Liverpool terminus of the Mersey Railway Tunnel in 1886. It is accessed by lifts and these were initially hydraulically operated. There were originally two platforms, on either side of a twin-track tunnel.

The Mersey railway tunnel was extended under dry land to Liverpool Central station in 1892, changing James Street's status to a through station. By this time, there were trains from Liverpool branching from Hamilton Square terminating at Birkenhead Park and Rock Ferry stations in Birkenhead. The line was electrified in 1903. Through trains to West Kirby and New Brighton commenced in 1938, when the former Wirral Railway routes were electrified.

In 1941, during the Liverpool Blitz, the Luftwaffe bombed the surface building of the station, damaging the then famous James Street hydraulic accumulator tower so badly it required demolition. A new surface building was built in the 1960s.

The station was rebuilt in the 1970s, opening in 1977, as a creation of the Merseyrail network. A new single-track tunnel known as the Loop was constructed being a part of the Wirral Line under Liverpool's city centre. The Loop ran west from the Mersey Railway tunnel via a newly constructed third platform at James Street, then onto Moorfields, Liverpool Lime Street and Liverpool Central, and back to James Street rejoining the Mersey railway tunnel just to the east of the station.

The eastern section of the original tunnel between Liverpool Central and James Street is used by the Northern Line. The remaining western section of the tunnel, which is not used by either the Wirral Line or Northern Line, was retained to provide a connection between the two for moving empty electric trains between depots at Birkenhead North and Kirkdale. Of the original two platforms at James Street, only the westbound remains in regular use. Platform 2, the original eastbound platform, is kept in near-original condition and is used only when trains are prevented from using the loop itself.

The station and surrounding area were subject to a £2 million package of improvements during 2007–8. Further refurbishment of platforms, concourses and the booking hall were undertaken in 2012–13, as part of a £40 million investment from Network Rail which saw all Merseyrail underground stations (excluding Conway Park) refurbished. Work to improve the little-used platform 2 and the Water Street entrance were completed during 2015.

A 16-year-old girl died in an incident at the station in 2011, when a train guard signalled for a train to depart while she was leaning against the train. She died after the movement caused her to fall between the platform edge and the moving train. The following year, the guard was convicted of manslaughter by gross negligence and sentenced to five years' imprisonment. A subsequent appeal of the sentence was rejected by the Court of Appeal.

== Station layout ==
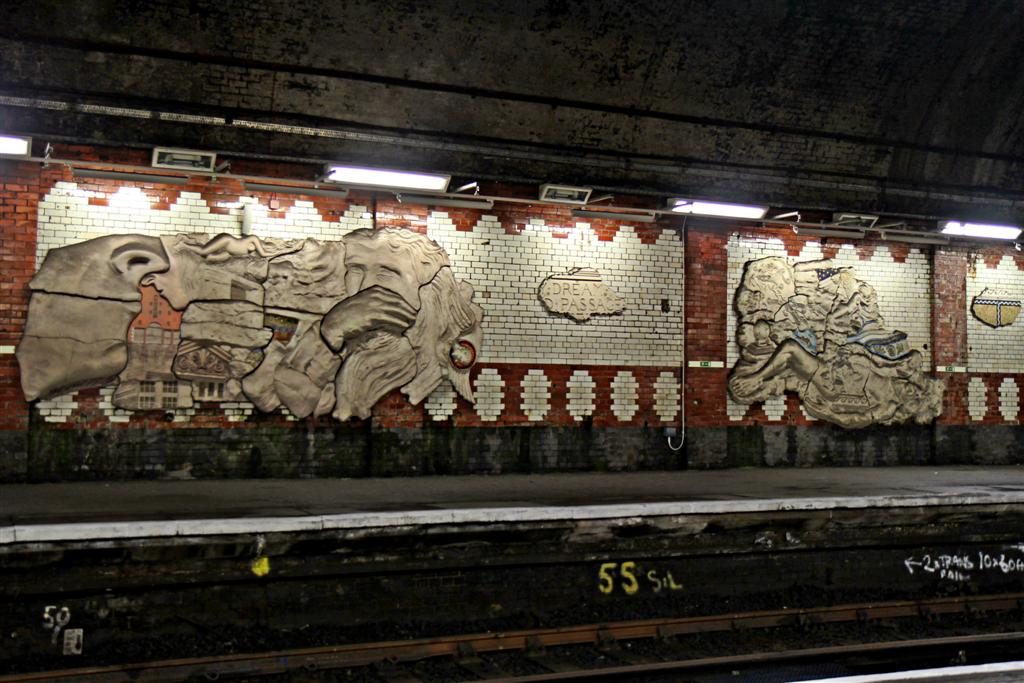
The frieze at the rarely used platform 2, before refurbishment

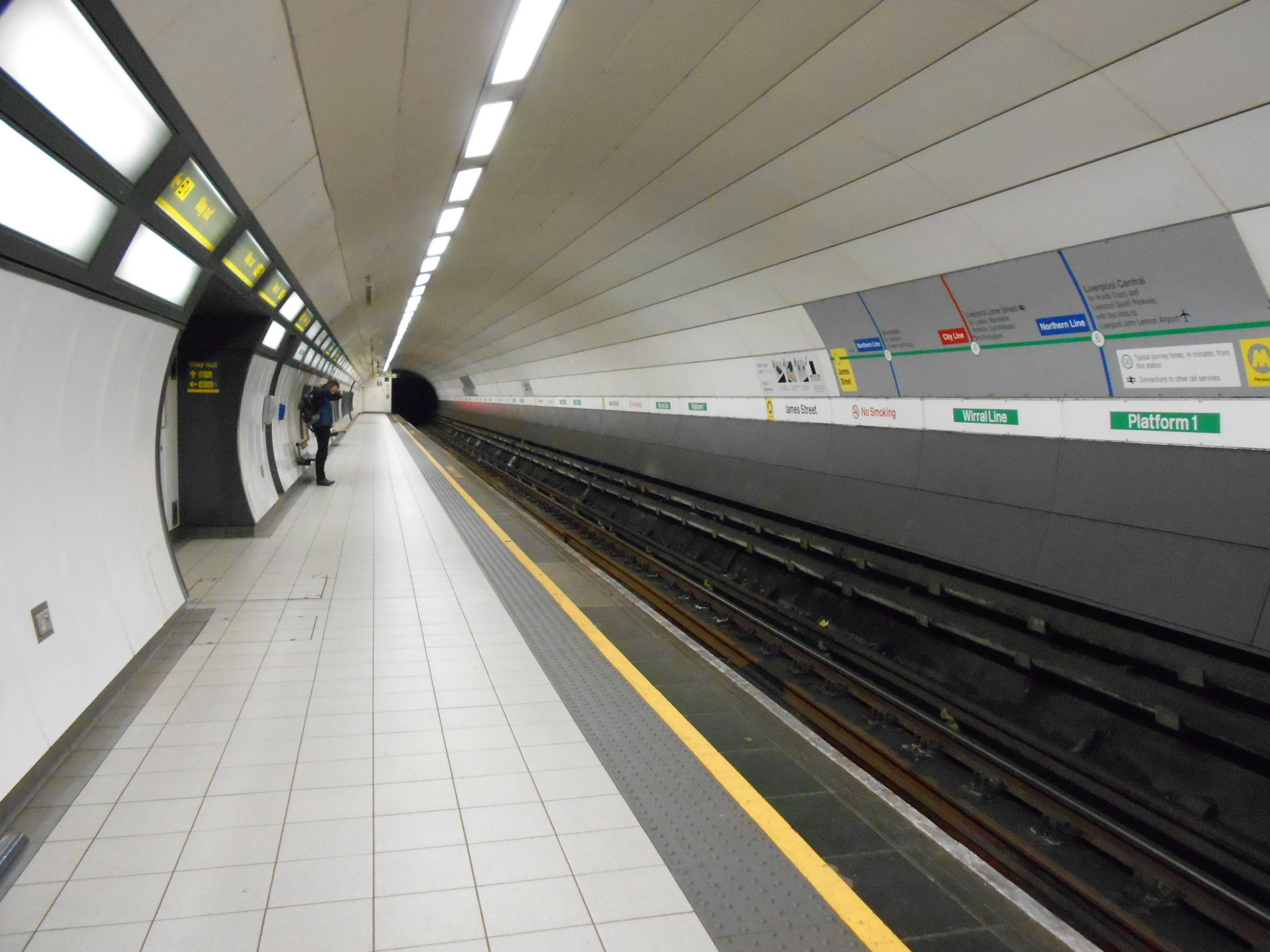
Platform 1, after refurbishment

James Street station has three platforms, although only two (1 and 3) see regular use. Platforms 2 and 3 are situated on either side of the original Mersey Railway tunnel, with platform 1 in the newer tunnel on the loop line. Platform 3 facilitates services westbound to the Wirral and platform 1 by trains eastbound towards Liverpool. Platform 2, which is situated on the empty stock line opposite platform 3, has not normally been used by passenger services since the opening of the loop line. This platform has a frieze artwork, on the wall.

The junction at the western end of the station (where the loop leaves the original line in order to pass through platform 1) is known as Mann Island Junction.

Occasionally, the loop line may close to allow for maintenance to occur. On these occasions, platform 2 is brought back into use to allow trains arriving from the Wirral to terminate and reverse there back onto the westbound line (either directly or via platform 3).

There are two entrances to the station. The main entrance on James Street itself has four lifts to reach the platforms from street level. It also has a small newsagents inside. The Water Street entrance uses a combination of staircases and a ramp over 150 yards long, which goes from ground level to just above the platforms. This entrance is open on weekdays between 7am and 7pm.

== Facilities ==
The station is staffed during all opening hours and has platform CCTV. There are toilets, a payphone, an ATM, booking office, and live departure and arrival screens, for passenger information. The station does not have a car park, though there is a cycle rack for eight bicycles. Step-free access to the platforms, for wheelchairs and prams, is possible, via the lifts.

== Services ==
Trains operate every five minutes (Monday-Saturday daytime) around the Liverpool city centre loop to Moorfields, Liverpool Lime Street and Liverpool Central. In the other direction, trains operate every five minutes to Birkenhead Hamilton Square, from where they continue every 15 minutes to each of New Brighton and West Kirby with six trains an hour to Hooton.

From Hooton, trains continue every 15 minutes to Chester and every 30 minutes to Ellesmere Port. At other times, trains operate every 30 minutes to each of the four destinations, giving a service every 5–10 minutes to Birkenhead Hamilton Square.

These services are provided by Merseyrail's fleet of Class 777 electric multiple units.

Preceding station	National Rail	Following station
Hamilton Square towards New Brighton, West Kirby, Chester or Ellesmere Port	Merseyrail; Wirral Line	Moorfields towards Liverpool Central
Hamilton Square towards New Brighton, West Kirby, Chester or Ellesmere Port	Merseyrail; Wirral Line	Liverpool Central (one-way operation)
	Ferry services	
Terminus	Mersey Ferries; Commuter ferry	Seacombe
Terminus	Isle of Man Steam Packet Company; High Speed Catamaran	Isle Of Man

== See also ==
- List of underground stations of the Merseyrail network
