= Rock Lane railway station =

Former railway station in Birkenhead, England

Rock Lane

General information
- Location: Rock Ferry, Wirral; England
- Coordinates: 53.3676°N 3.0079°W
- Grid reference: SJ330860
- Platforms: Two

Other information
- Status: Disused

History
- Opened: June 1846
- Closed: 1 November 1862
- Original company: Chester and Birkenhead Railway
- Pre-grouping: Birkenhead Joint Railway
Location

Rock Lane was a railway station on the Chester and Birkenhead Railway in Cheshire, England. It opened in June 1846 and closed on 1 November 1862, and it consisted of two platforms (only one up to 1847).

In July 1847, the railway became part of the Birkenhead, Lancashire and Cheshire Junction Railway which doubled the line, probably adding the second platform to Rock Lane at this time. In 1862, Rock Lane Station closed, to be replaced with a new station a short distance away, called Rock Ferry.

In 1891, the Birkenhead And Chester Line quadrupled the track, destroying any remains of the station.

| Preceding station | Historical railways | Following station |
|---|---|---|
| Bebington & New Ferry; Line and station open | GWR & LNWR; Chester and Birkenhead Railway | Tranmere; Line open, station closed |
