= List of underground stations of the Merseyrail network =

This article lists the seven underground stations and three below ground level stations of the Merseyrail network which is centred on Liverpool, England.

== Underground stations ==
Coordinates	Station	Area	Photo	Platforms	Opened	Usage 2021/22 (millions)	Managed by	Line(s)	Zone
53.4045°N 2.9797°W	Liverpool Central	Liverpool City Centre		3	1892 (Low level)	10.747	Merseyrail	Northern; Wirral	C1
53.393°N 3.023°W	Conway Park	Birkenhead		2	22 June 1998	0.625	Merseyrail	Wirral	B1
53.3947°N 3.0139°W	Birkenhead Hamilton Square	Birkenhead		3	1 February 1886	1.223	Merseyrail	Wirral	B1
53.4048°N 2.9919°W	James Street	Liverpool City Centre		3	1886	2.263	Merseyrail	Wirral	C1
53.4075°N 2.9784°W	Liverpool Lime Street	Liverpool City Centre		1 (Note: Underground station only. There are more platforms in the mainline station)	1977	10.464 (Note: Applies to the whole station, not just the underground.)	Merseyrail (Underground only)	Wirral	C1
53.4086°N 2.9892°W	Moorfields	Liverpool City Centre		3	2 May 1977 (Northern Line); 30 October 1977 (Wirral Line)	4.808	Merseyrail	Northern; Wirral	C1

== Sub-surface stations - built in cuttings ==
Coordinates	Station	Area	Photo	Platforms	Opened	Usage 2010/11 (millions)	Managed by	Line(s)	Zones
53.389°N 3.019°W	Birkenhead Central	Birkenhead Town Centre		2	1886	0.596	Merseyrail	Wirral	B1
53.383°N 3.016°W	Green Lane	Tranmere		2	1886	0.356	Merseyrail	Wirral	B1
53.3757°N 2.9529°W	Aughton Park	Aughton		2	1907	0.112	Merseyrail	Northern	B1

== Former stations ==
Coordinates	Station	Area	Image	Platforms	Opened	Closed	Managed by
53.3943°N 2.9764°W	St James	Toxteth	-	2	1 March 1874	1 January 1917	Cheshire Lines Committee

== Future ==
St James railway station, which has been closed since 1917, is due to be reopened as Liverpool Baltic railway station, with construction expected to start in 2026. Serving the Baltic Triangle development in Toxteth, when opened, the station will be on the Merseyrail Northern Line between Liverpool Central and Brunswick railway station.

== Sources ==
- Butt, R. V. J. (October 1995). The Directory of Railway Stations: details every public and private passenger station, halt, platform and stopping place, past and present (1st ed.). Sparkford: Patrick Stephens Ltd. ISBN 978-1-85260-508-7. OCLC 60251199. OL 11956311M.
- Quick, Michael (2009) [2001]. Railway passenger stations in Great Britain: a chronology (4th ed.). Oxford: Railway & Canal Historical Society. ISBN 978-0-901461-57-5. OCLC 612226077.
