= Tranmere, Merseyside =

Coordinates: 53.3788°N 3.0205°W

Tranmere
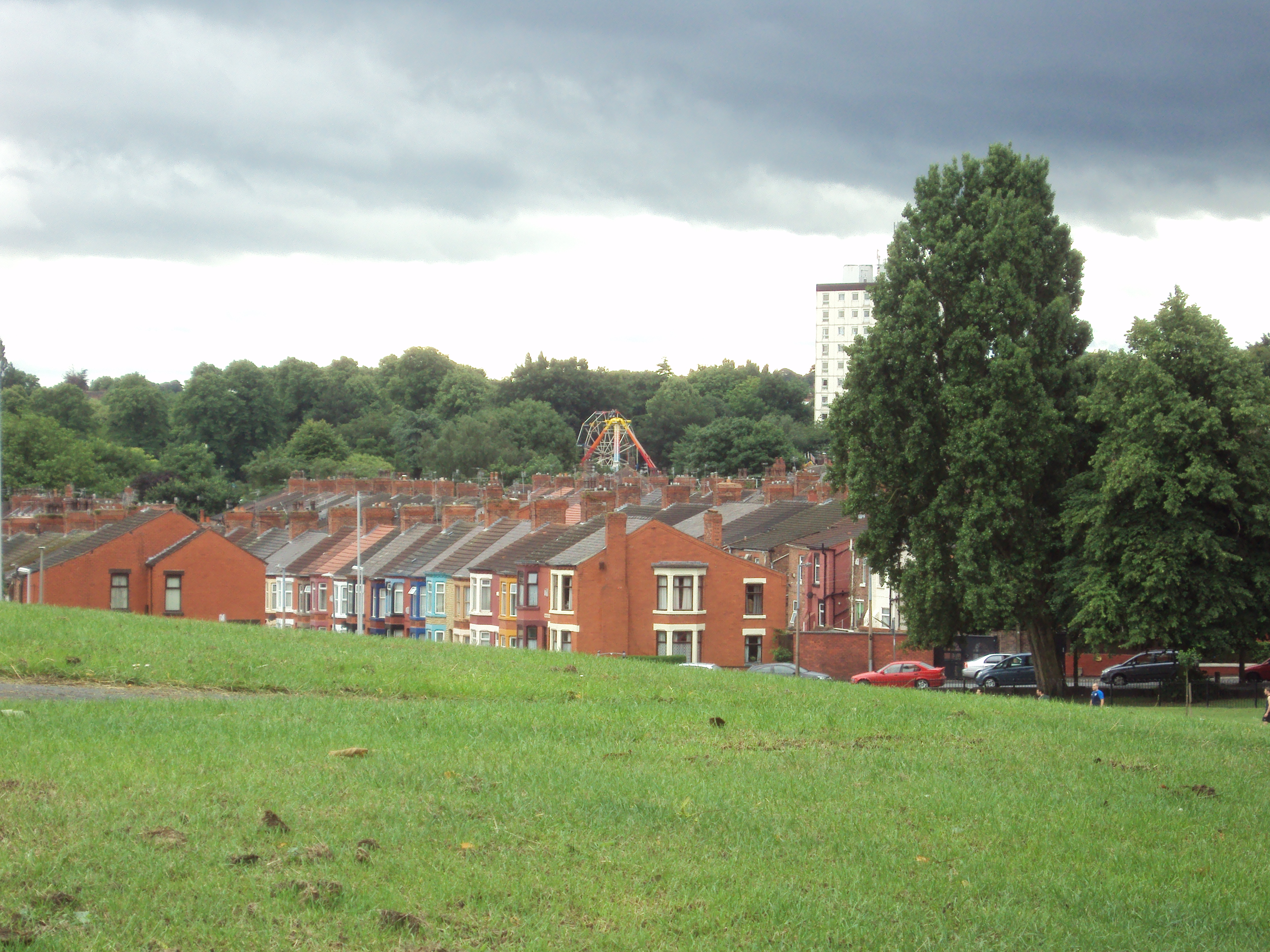
- Looking from Mersey Park to Agnes Road and towards Victoria Park

- Location within Merseyside
- Population: 11,668 (2001 Census)
- OS grid reference: SJ300850
  - London: 178 mi (286 km) SE
- Metropolitan borough: Wirral
- Metropolitan county: Merseyside
- Region: North West
- Country: England
- Sovereign state: United Kingdom
- Post town: BIRKENHEAD
- Postcode district: CH41
- Dialling code: 0151
- ISO 3166 code: GB-WRL
- Police: Merseyside
- Fire: Merseyside
- Ambulance: North West
- UK Parliament: Birkenhead

Tranmere is a suburb of Birkenhead, on the Wirral Peninsula, England. Administratively, it is within the Birkenhead and Tranmere Ward of the Metropolitan Borough of Wirral, in Merseyside. Before local government reorganisation on 1 April 1974, it was part of the County Borough of Birkenhead, within the county of Cheshire.

At the 2001 census, the population of Tranmere was 11,668. By the 2011 census the suburb was combined with the centre of Birkenhead. The population was recorded as 15,879.

== History ==
Its name was given by Norwegian Vikings who settled and colonised Wirral in the 10th century. Tranmere in Old Norse is Trani-melr, meaning "crane (bird) sandbank" or "sandbank with the cranes".

Until the early 19th century, Tranmere was the second most populous settlement in Wirral, with a population of 353 in 1801, centred mainly in the area of what is now Church Road and the nearby hamlet of Hinderton. By 1901, the number of residents had grown to 37,709.

Tranmere Old Hall and its estate, was situated around what is now Church Road. It was a large, gabled building constructed around 1614. According to the author Philip Sulley's The Hundred of Wirral (1889), in about 1860:

... [Tranmere Old Hall] was pulled down by an ignorant boor who became possessed of it by some mischance, to make way for shops and houses.

Tranmere was historically a township in the ancient parish of Bebington in the Wirral Hundred of Cheshire. The township was made a local government district in 1860, governed by a local board. In 1866 Tranmere became a separate civil parish. The local government district was abolished in 1877 and its area was incorporated into the new municipal borough of Birkenhead. Tranmere continued to be a civil parish within the borough until 31 March 1898 when all the parishes within the borough were merged into a single parish. In 1891 the parish had a population of 30,680. On creation of the county of Merseyside in 1974, Tranmere became part of the Metropolitan Borough of Wirral.

The Ingleborough Road Memorial Playing Fields were part of the now defunct Birkenhead Institute school from 1925 and opened for use the following year. The fields and pavilion were created as a memorial to the former students of the school killed in action in World War I, which included the poet Wilfred Owen. Ornamental gates were added to the site in 1933. The site was purchased by Tranmere Rovers Football Club in 1995. Despite opposition, the land was redeveloped for housing in 2012.

=== Ferry service ===
Queen Elizabeth granted John Poole the lease of ferry rights at Tranmere in 1586. The Etna, the first steam-powered ferry on the River Mersey, operated from Tranmere Pool to Liverpool on 17 April 1817. The early part of the 19th century was a prosperous time for Tranmere's ferry service, but this was to change with the completion of Thomas Brassey's New Chester Road in 1833 and the opening of the Chester and Birkenhead Railway in 1840. Further blows to trade came with the commencement of a horse-drawn tramway in 1877 between New Ferry and Woodside Ferry and the opening of the Mersey Railway between Liverpool and nearby Green Lane railway station in 1886. By 1904, the ferry service had ceased and Tranmere Pool was enclosed as Cammell Laird Dock as part of an extension of the shipyard.

=== Air raid shelter ===
Tranmere contains one of the largest and most expensive World War II air raid shelters in the country. The shelter consists of a series of tunnels stretching to a total length of 6,500 ft (2 km), and was designed to house up to 6,000 people; many of them workers at the strategically important Cammell Laird shipyard. By the time the tunnels were completed, they were no longer needed as the threat of invasion had diminished. The tunnels were later used by the Ministry of Food for storage, and were considered as a nuclear fallout shelter during the Cold War era. The tunnels were sealed in 1989, amid growing health and safety concerns. The tunnels still exist and building work in 2008 uncovered a shaft, which allowed temporary exploration, before being sealed again.

== Geography ==
Tranmere is situated on the eastern side of the Wirral Peninsula, at the western side of the River Mersey. The area is approximately 7 km (4.3 mi) south-south-east of the Irish Sea at New Brighton and about 9.5 km (5.9 mi) east-north-east of the Dee Estuary at Thurstaston. Tranmere is at an elevation of between 0–54 m (0–177 ft) above sea level, with the highest point to the south of St Catherine's Hospital.

== Governance ==
Tranmere is within the parliamentary constituency of Birkenhead. The current Member of Parliament is Alison McGovern, a Labour representative.

At local government level, the area is mostly incorporated into the Birkenhead and Tranmere Ward of the Metropolitan Borough of Wirral, in the metropolitan county of Merseyside. (A small portion to the south of Green Lane station is now part of the Rock Ferry Ward.) Representation on Wirral Metropolitan Borough Council is undertaken by three councillors. The most recent local elections took place on 6 May 2021.

== Community ==
Tranmere is made up of industrial buildings and Victorian terraced houses, although it has seen a significant amount of property development recently. From 2005, the area was one of the 35 government neighbourhood pathfinder areas.

=== Education ===
Mersey Park Primary School and Well Lane Primary School serve the area.

=== Healthcare ===
St Catherine's Health Centre occupies a large site in Higher Tranmere. The original facility on the site was built as the Birkenhead Union Workhouse between 1861 and 1863 and designed by Thomas Leyland. Around 2013, the Victorian hospital buildings were replaced with a modern medical facility and community centre.

=== Green spaces ===
Two urban parks are located in Tranmere. Mersey Park to the north and Victoria Park to the south. Mersey Park hosts one of several annual Bonfire Night municipal firework displays put on by Wirral Borough Council. Victoria Park contains a community hall at the bottom of Albany Road, a cricket pitch and clubhouse. Victoria Park was originally the gardens of a large property called The Towers, built in the 1860s as a French-style chateau by Victor Poutz, a French cotton merchant.

== Landmarks ==
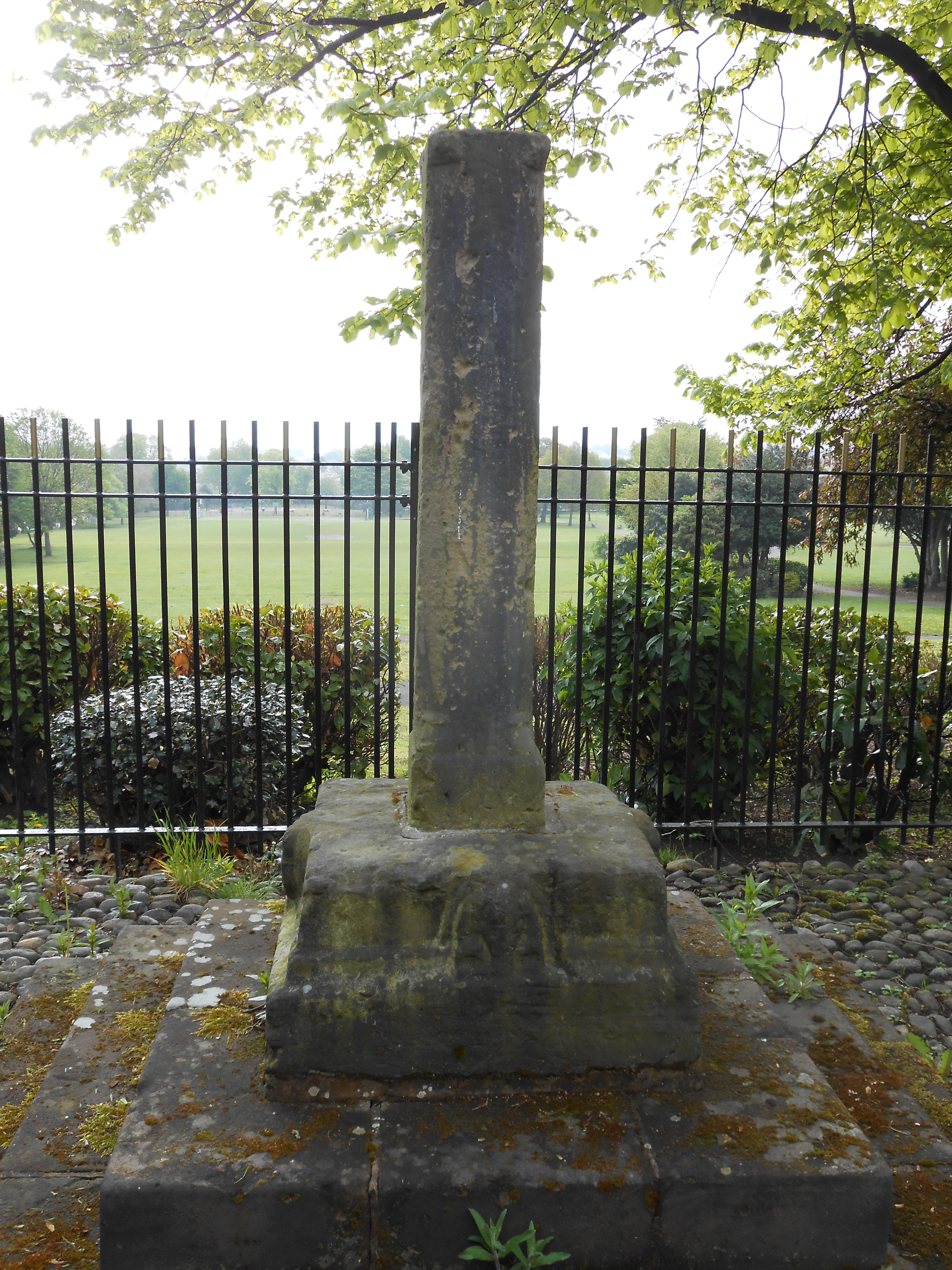
Tranmere Cross, Victoria Park

At the top end of Victoria Park stands the Tranmere Cross, a cross fragment with a worn stone base, believed to have originated c. the fifteenth century. The structure is a designated Grade II listed building that was put on the present site in 1937 and which once marked the entrance to Tranmere on Church Road.

== Sport ==
Tranmere is best known for its football club, Tranmere Rovers F.C., founded in 1884. Tranmere Rovers now plays at nearby Prenton Park, in Birkenhead itself, but has kept the Tranmere name.

== Transport ==
Green Lane railway station is situated on the Wirral line of the Merseyrail network. Services operate northbound to Liverpool, via Birkenhead town centre and southbound to Chester and Ellesmere Port.

== Notable people ==
First World War poet Wilfred Owen lived at three successive homes in Tranmere during the time his father was Stationmaster at Woodside from 1898 to 1907 and was a pupil at the nearby Birkenhead Institute School, now defunct.

Mersey Park Primary School has several famous former pupils including Jason McAteer (footballer) and Patricia Routledge (Hyacinth Bucket in the BBC TV sitcom Keeping up Appearances). Paul O'Grady, famous for his alter-ego creation Lily Savage, was raised in the area.

Colin Haygarth, The Queen Mother's gunmaker from 1965 until 2002, was born in Tranmere. He lived in Milton Road until he was four years old, when his family moved to nearby Irby. As a teen during the Second World War, he made parts for Sten guns in the workshops of the gunmaker W.C. Carswell in Liverpool and also served in the Irby branch of the Home Guard. In 1957 he started "C H Haygarth", a gun- and rifle-making business in the Scottish Highlands.

== See also ==
- Listed buildings in Tranmere, Merseyside

== Bibliography ==
- Allison, J. E. (1976). Sidelights on Tranmere. Birkenhead: Birkenhead History Society. ISBN 9780950567105. OCLC 3750230.
- Mortimer, William Williams (1847). The History of the Hundred of Wirral. London: Whittaker & Co. pp195-200.
- Pevsner, Nikolaus; Hubbard, Edward (1971). Cheshire. The Buildings of England. Penguin. p. 104. ISBN 9780140710427. OCLC 521341.
