= Rock Ferry railway station =

Railway station on the Chester & Ellesmere Port branches of the Wirral line in England

Rock Ferry
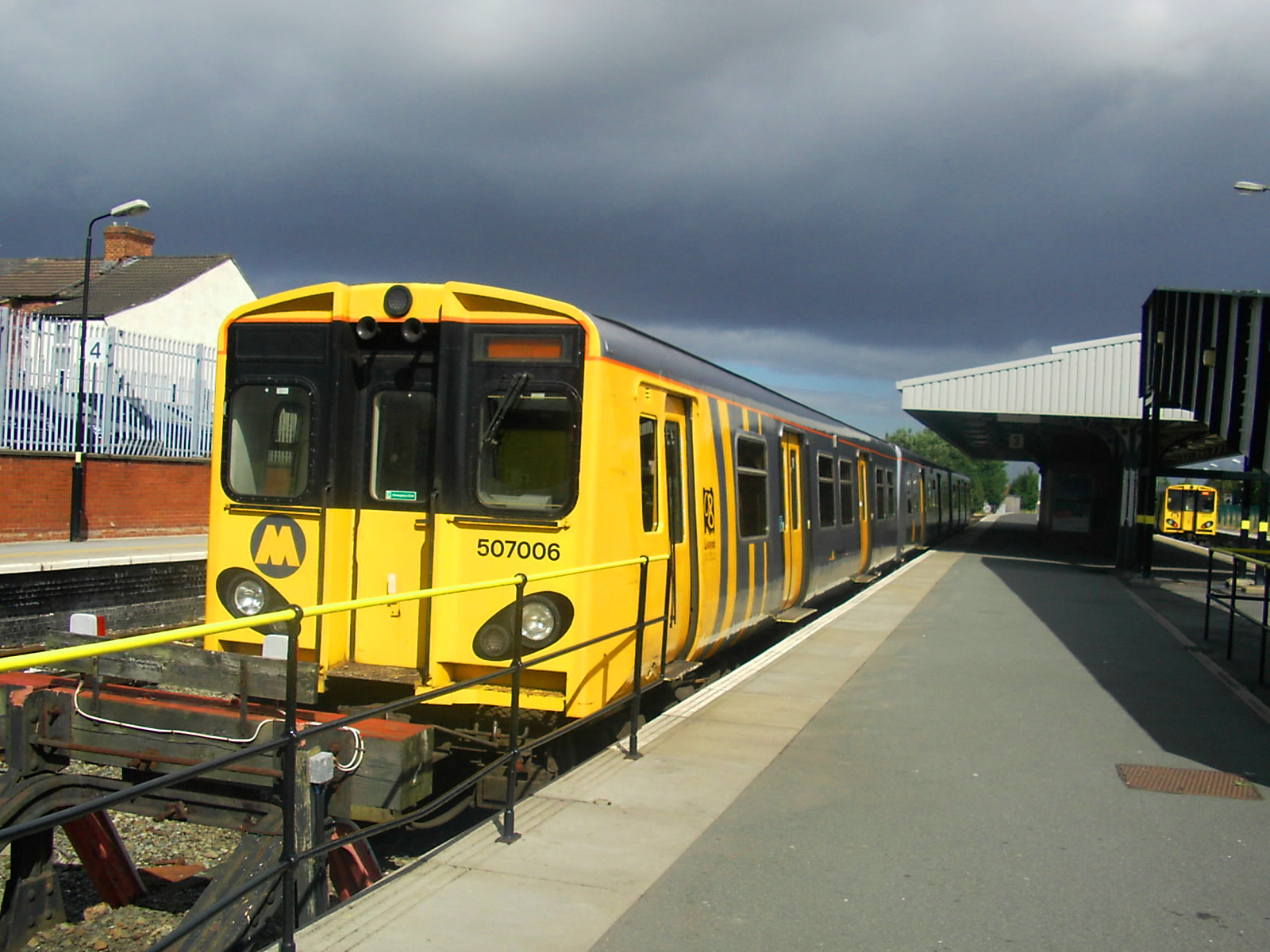
- A Class 507 Merseyrail train at the stabling siding at Rock Ferry.

General information
- Location: Rock Ferry, Wirral; England
- Coordinates: 53.373°N 3.011°W
- Grid reference: SJ328866
- Manager: Merseyrail
- Transit authority: Merseytravel
- Platforms: 4 (only 2 see regular use)

Other information
- Station code: RFY
- Fare zone: B1
- Classification: DfT category E

Key dates
- 1862: 1st station opened
- 1891: 1st station closed and 2nd one opened

Passengers
- 2021/22: ▲0.555 million
- 2022/23: ▲0.676 million
- 2023/24: ▲0.732 million
- 2024/25: ▼0.686 million
- 2025/26: ▲0.724 million
Location
Notes
- Passenger statistics from the Office of Rail and Road

Rock Ferry on the Wirral Line

Rock Ferry railway station is situated in the Rock Ferry area of Birkenhead, Merseyside, England. The station lies 4.5 miles (7 km) south west of Liverpool Lime Street on the Chester and Ellesmere Port branches of the Wirral Line of the Merseyrail network. The station has an island platform with four platforms in total and four tracks.

Two platforms are unused with two tracks used for train stabling. The Birkenhead Dock Branch line branched off the line south of the station, with freight trains passing to the western side of the station. The freight line fell into disuse in 1993.

== History ==
Rock Ferry station first opened on 31 October 1862 replacing Rock Lane on the Chester and Birkenhead Railway. In 1891 it became an interchange as the terminus of the largely underground urban Mersey Railway line from Liverpool via the Mersey Railway Tunnel, when the line extended south from its previous terminus at Green Lane station. The Mersey Railway was converted to electric train services from steam in 1903. The station was also a through stop and interchange on the Chester to Birkenhead Woodside terminal station non-electric line giving connections to the Mersey Railway. Until 1967 Rock Ferry was the first stop out of Birkenhead Woodside on the former GWR main line from Birkenhead Woodside to London Paddington station. All long-distance services called at Rock Ferry to give interchange connections with the Mersey railway for Liverpool bound passengers.

From 1967 with the closure of Birkenhead Woodside station the Rock Ferry station became a 100% terminus and interchange station for electric services from the north from Liverpool's city centre and diesel trains services from the south from Chester and Helsby. The electric services to Liverpool were integrated into the Merseyrail urban network in the 1970s becoming the Wirral Line.

In 1985 the Merseyrail Wirral Line was extended to Hooton, Chester and Ellesmere Port from Rock Ferry with the station becoming fully integrated into the Merseyrail urban network. This integration transformed Rock Ferry into a through-station. The first Merseyrail section extension was to Hooton in 1985, then to Chester in 1993 and finally Ellesmere Port in 1994. The section of line from Ellesmere Port to Helsby was not electrified with the line having only a 'Parliamentary' service. Recent refurbishment work to the station has included the restoration of a building on the island platform and installation of a fully accessible toilet and waiting room. The booking hall and entrance have also benefited from improved security and lighting. The old Merseyrail terminating tracks are now used as stabling sidings with the platforms only having one or two passenger services to Liverpool starting in the early in the morning. Platform 3 is only used once a day from Monday to Saturday before 0600 and Platform 4 is used twice before 0800 on Sundays.

== Facilities ==
The station is staffed, during all opening hours, and has platform CCTV. There is a payphone, a vending machine and a booking office. Each of the two remaining former GWR/LMS Joint platforms now in use has sheltered seating and live departure and arrival screens, the Liverpool-bound platform retaining its canopy; the two bay platforms which were formerly used by the Mersey Railway are now used primarily for carriage storing; the two further former GWR/LMS Joint platforms are abandoned and out of use. The station has a free car park, with 25 spaces; it also has secure cycle storage for 24 cycles. Access to the station is by ramp. The only access to the Chester/Ellesmere Port bound platform for passengers with wheelchairs or prams is via a stepped ramp.

== Services ==
Trains operate every 15 minutes between Chester and Liverpool on weekdays and Saturdays until late evening when the service becomes half-hourly, as it is on Sundays. Additionally there is a half-hourly service between Liverpool and Ellesmere Port all day, every day. Northbound trains operate via Birkenhead Hamilton Square station in Birkenhead and the Mersey Railway Tunnel to Liverpool. Southbound trains all proceed as far as Hooton, where the lines to Chester and Ellesmere Port divide. These services are all provided by Merseyrail's fleet of Class 777 EMUs.

== Gallery ==
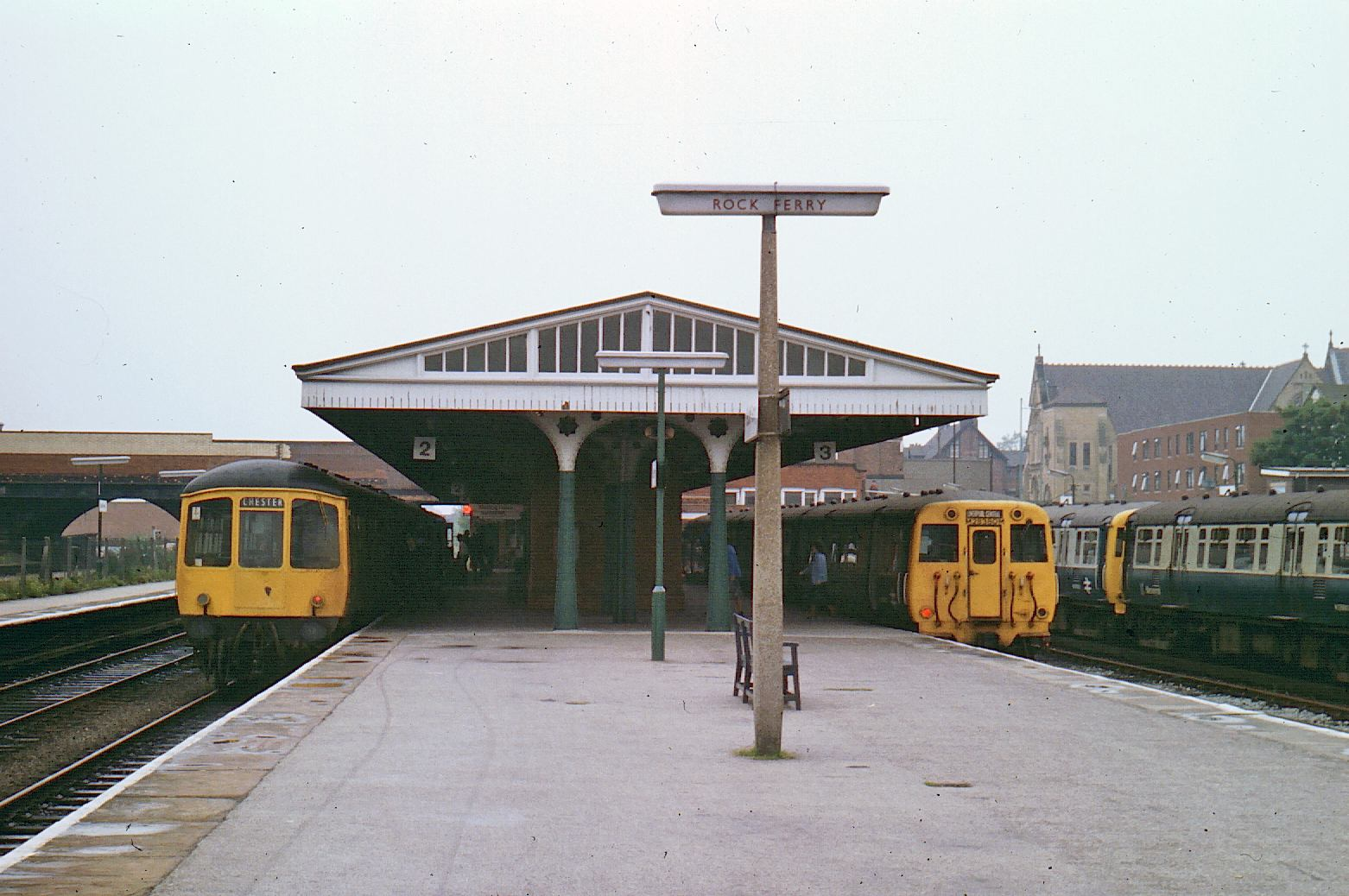
Looking south. Interchange between Merseyrail trains, at the buffers to the right, and the diesel trains in June 1980.

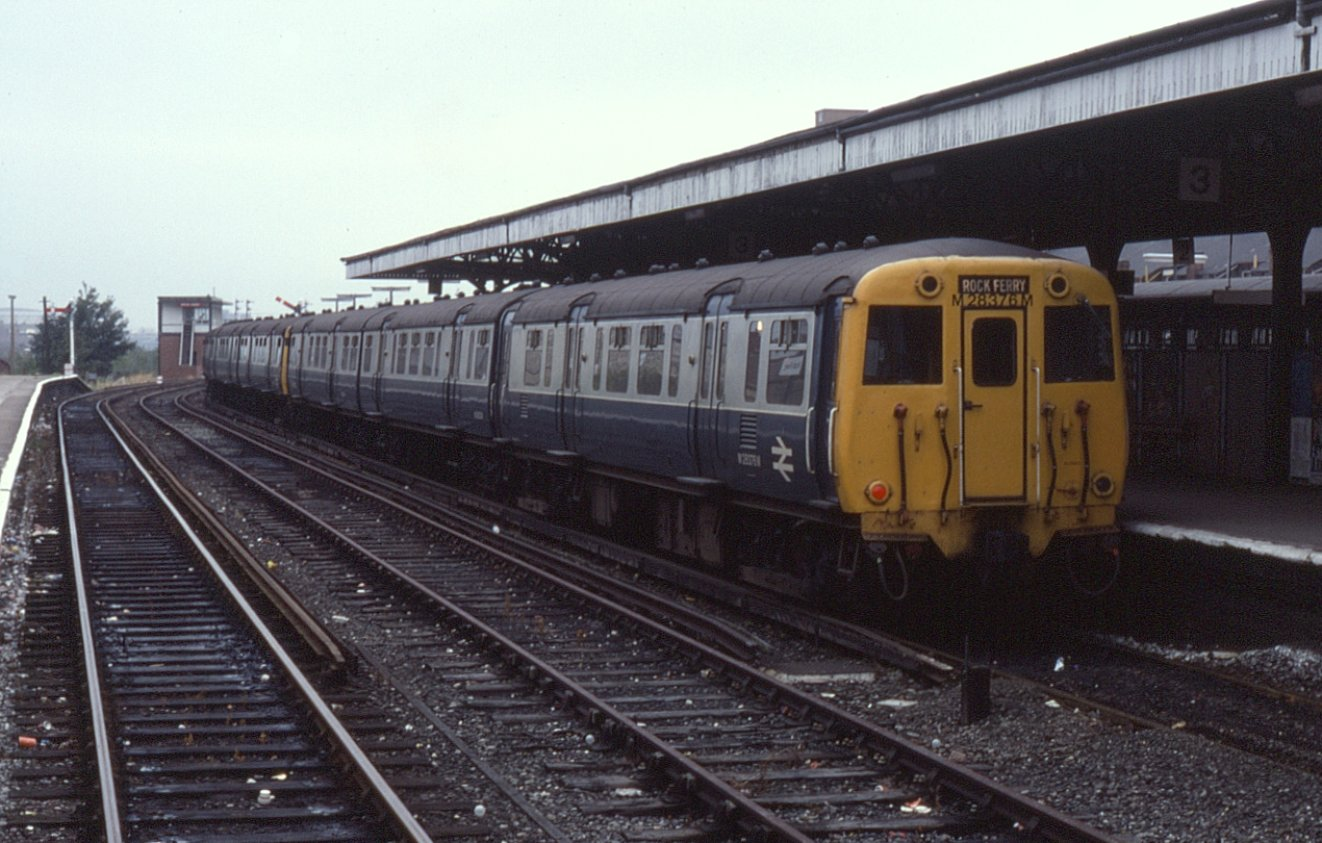
Looking north. A British Rail Class 503 Merseyrail train at Rock Ferry, in 1983. Buffers are just off the bottom of the picture.

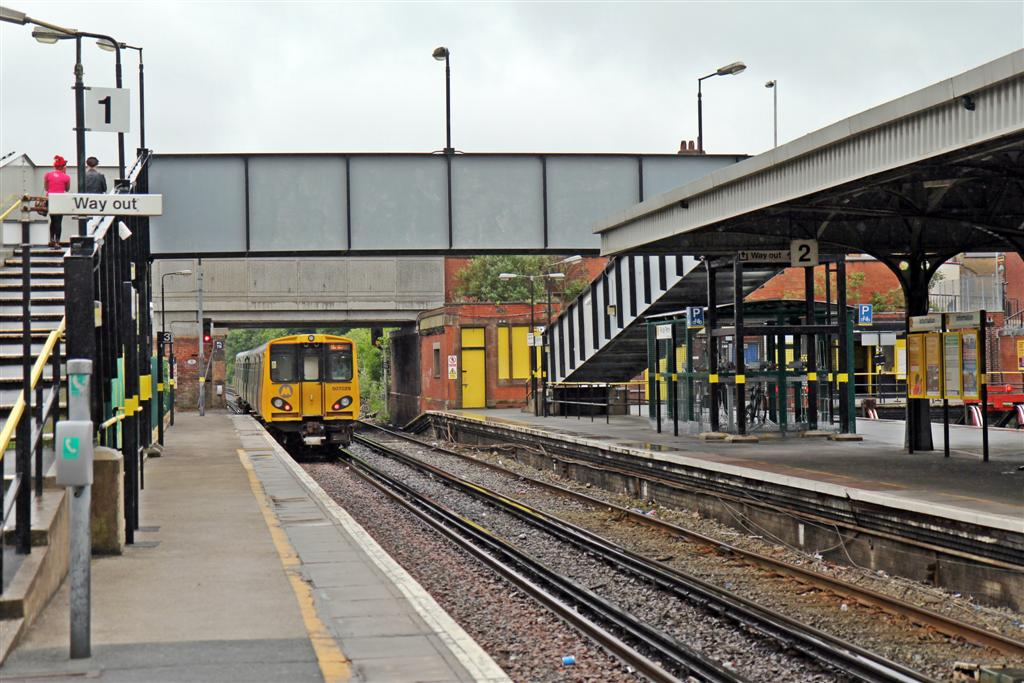
A Merseyrail Class 507 departs towards Bebington.

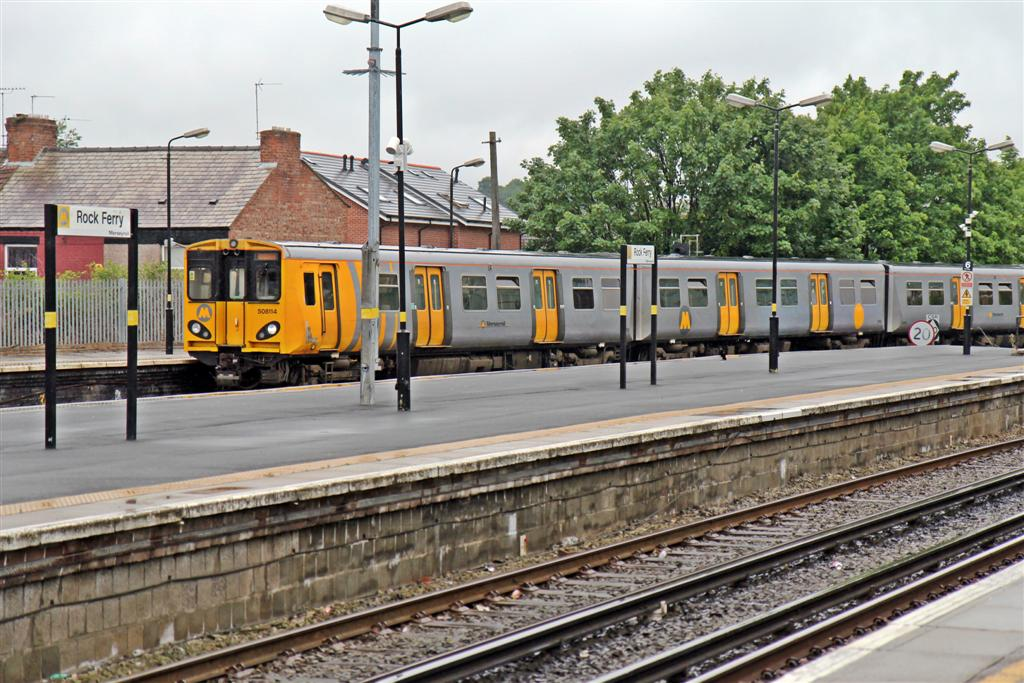
A Merseyrail Class 508 pulls into the stabling siding platforms at Rock Ferry.

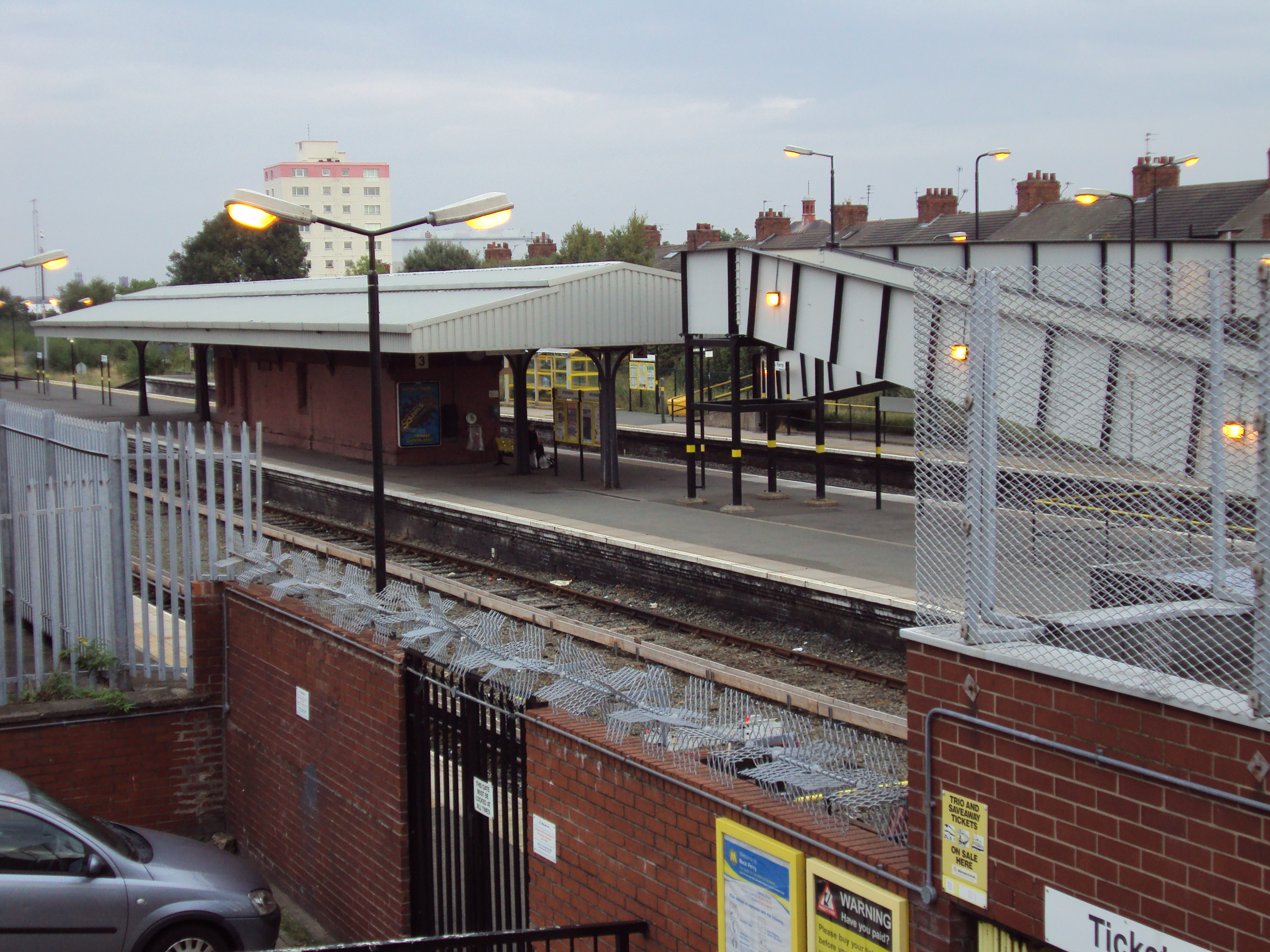
The platform and footbridge.

Preceding station	National Rail	Following station
Bebington towards Chester or Ellesmere Port	Merseyrail; Wirral Line; Ellesmere Port/Chester	Green Lane towards Liverpool Central
	Historical railways	
Rock Lane; Line open, station closed	GWR & LNWR; Chester & Birkenhead Railway	Tranmere; Line open, station closed
