= Green Lane railway station =

Railway station on the Chester & Ellesmere Port branches of the Wirral line in England

Green Lane
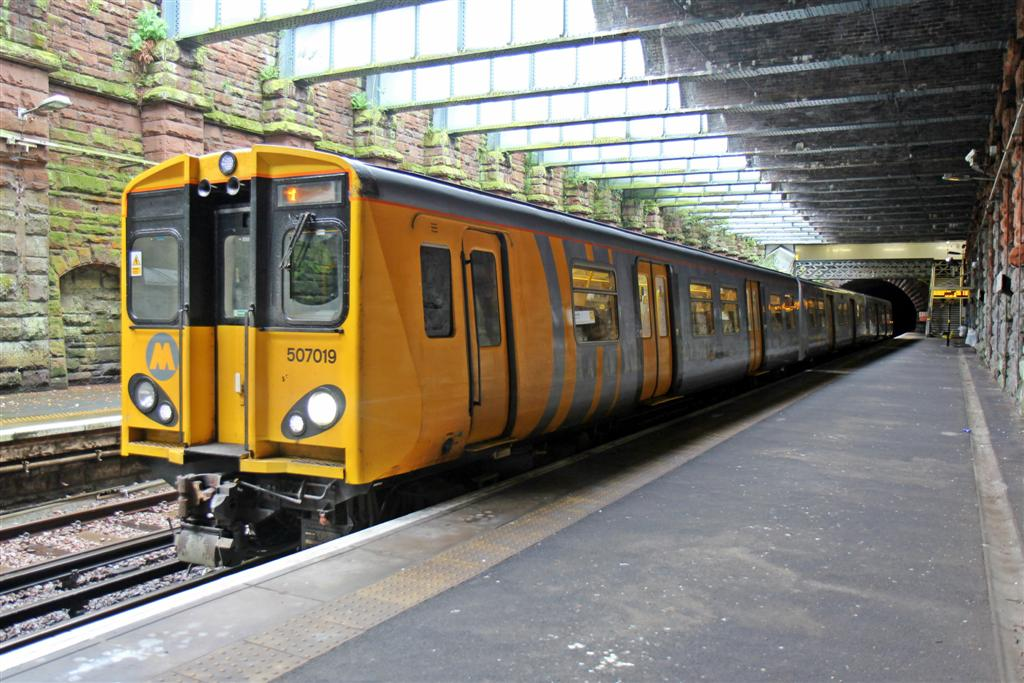

General information
- Location: Tranmere, Wirral; England
- Coordinates: 53.383°N 3.016°W
- Grid reference: SJ325878
- Manager: Merseyrail
- Transit authority: Merseytravel
- Platforms: 2

Other information
- Station code: GNL
- Fare zone: B1
- Classification: DfT category E

Key dates
- 1886 1903: Opened; Electrified

Passengers
- 2021/22: ▲0.356 million
- 2022/23: ▼0.352 million
- 2023/24: ▼0.338 million
- 2024/25: ▲0.375 million
- 2025/26: ▲0.422 million
Location
Notes
- Passenger statistics from the Office of Rail and Road

Green Lane railway station serves the Tranmere area of Birkenhead, Merseyside, England. The station is situated on the Chester, Liverpool Central and Ellesmere Port branches of the Wirral Line, part of the Merseyrail network.

== History ==
The station was opened in 1886 as the terminus of the Mersey Railway's line from Liverpool via the Mersey Railway Tunnel. In 1891 the line was extended southwards to Rock Ferry, and was subsequently electrified in 1903. The line was integrated into the Merseyrail network in the 1970s. Merseyrail extensions in the 1980s and 1990s allowed train services to be extended beyond Rock Ferry; first to Hooton in 1985, then to Chester in 1993 and finally Ellesmere Port in 1994.

In early June 2014 it was announced that this station would be among a small number of stations on the Merseyrail network that will be spruced up as part of a £3.7m programme of improvements. In May 2015, the ticket office closed for refurbishment works to take place and it reopened in June 2015. On 15 June, work started on the platform areas. 6 car trains did not stop at the station between 15 June and 20 July whilst some of these works took place. The old waiting shelters were replaced with new ones and a cover was placed over the majority of the Liverpool bound platform. New lighting and information boards have also been introduced throughout the station, as well as new artwork on the Chester and Ellesmere Port Platform.

== Facilities ==
The station is staffed, 15 minutes before the first train and 15 minutes after the last train, and has platform CCTV. There is a payphone, booking office and live departure and arrival screens on the platform, for passenger information. The station has a free car park with 60 spaces, as well as secure cycle locker with 18 spaces. There is no access to the platforms for passengers with wheelchairs or prams, as platform access involves two staircases.

== Services ==
As of 27 December 2023, trains operate every 30 minutes between Liverpool and Ellesmere Port, and every 15 minutes between Liverpool and Chester. Northbound trains operate via Birkenhead Hamilton Square station in Birkenhead and the Mersey Railway Tunnel to Liverpool. Southbound trains travel towards Hooton, where the lines to Chester and Ellesmere Port divide. These services are provided by Merseyrail's fleet of Class 777 EMUs.

== Gallery ==
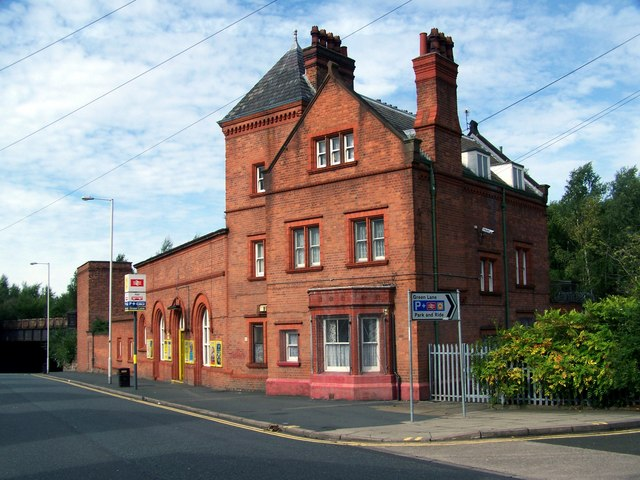
The station building.

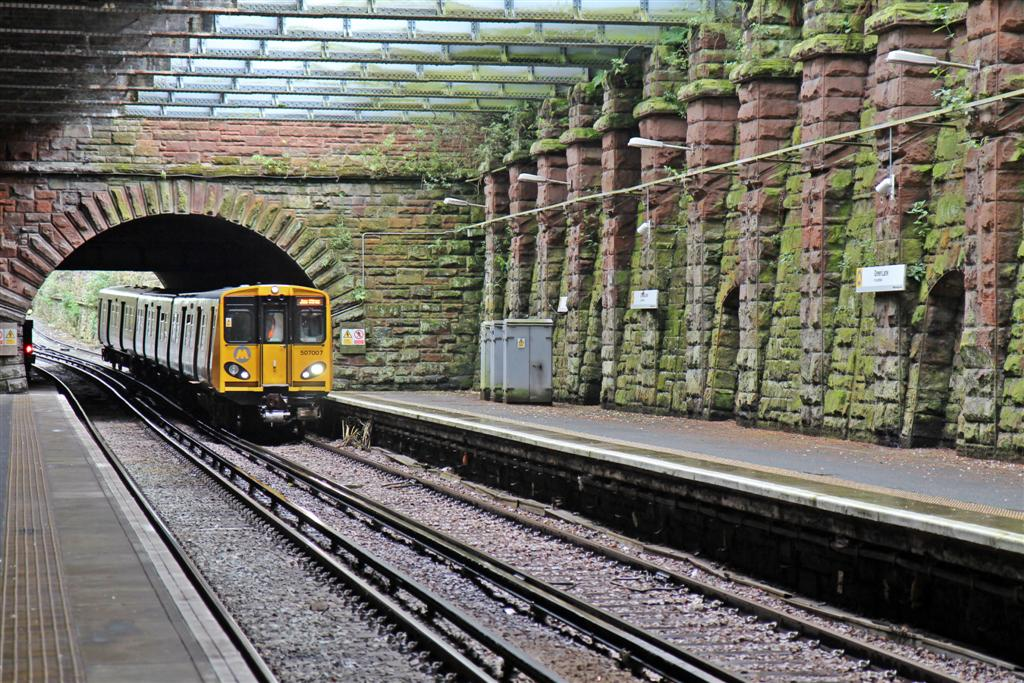
A Merseyrail Class 507 at Green Lane.

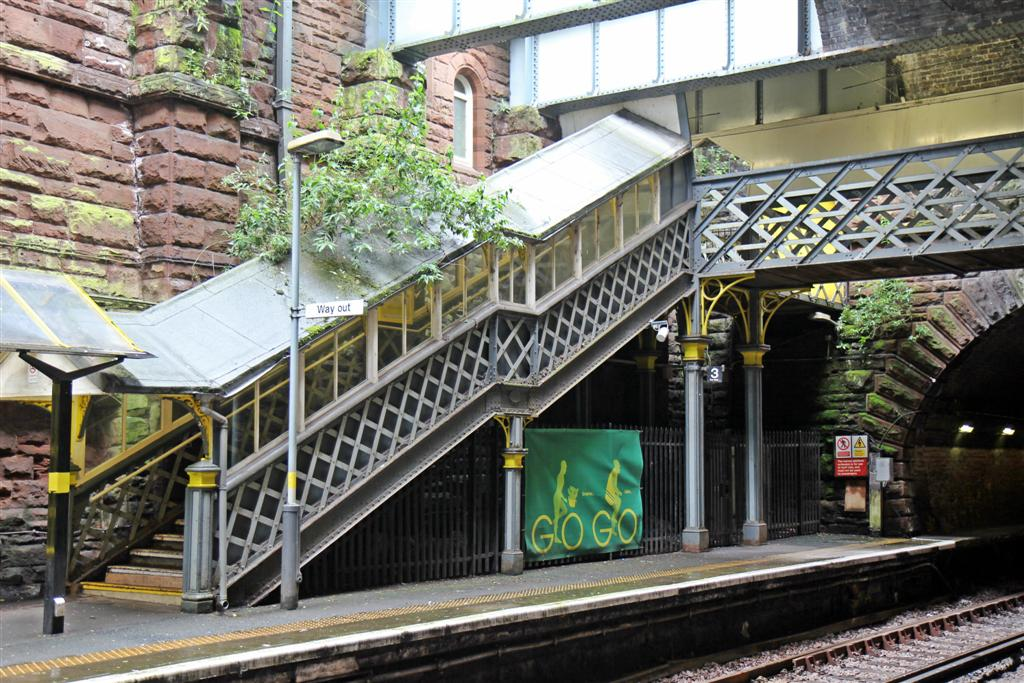
The footbridge.

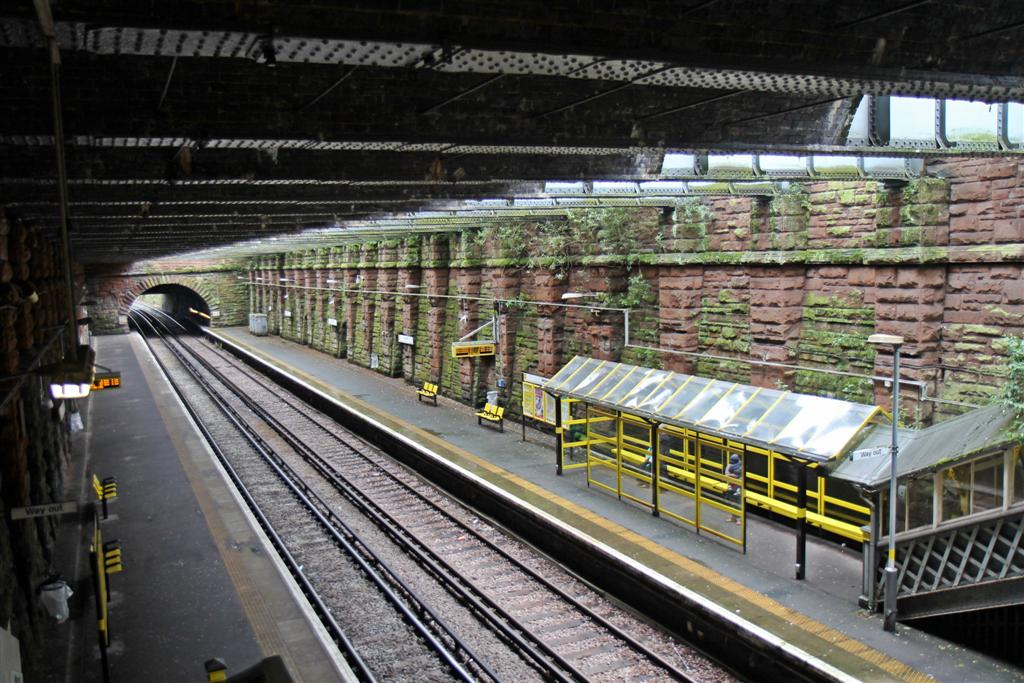
An overall view of the station, from the top of the footbridge.

== See also ==
- List of underground stations of the Merseyrail network

Preceding station	National Rail	Following station
Rock Ferry towards Chester or Ellesmere Port	Merseyrail; Wirral Line	Birkenhead Central towards Liverpool Central
