= Birkenhead Hamilton Square railway station =

Railway station on the Wirral line in Birkenhead, Wirral, England

Birkenhead Hamilton Square
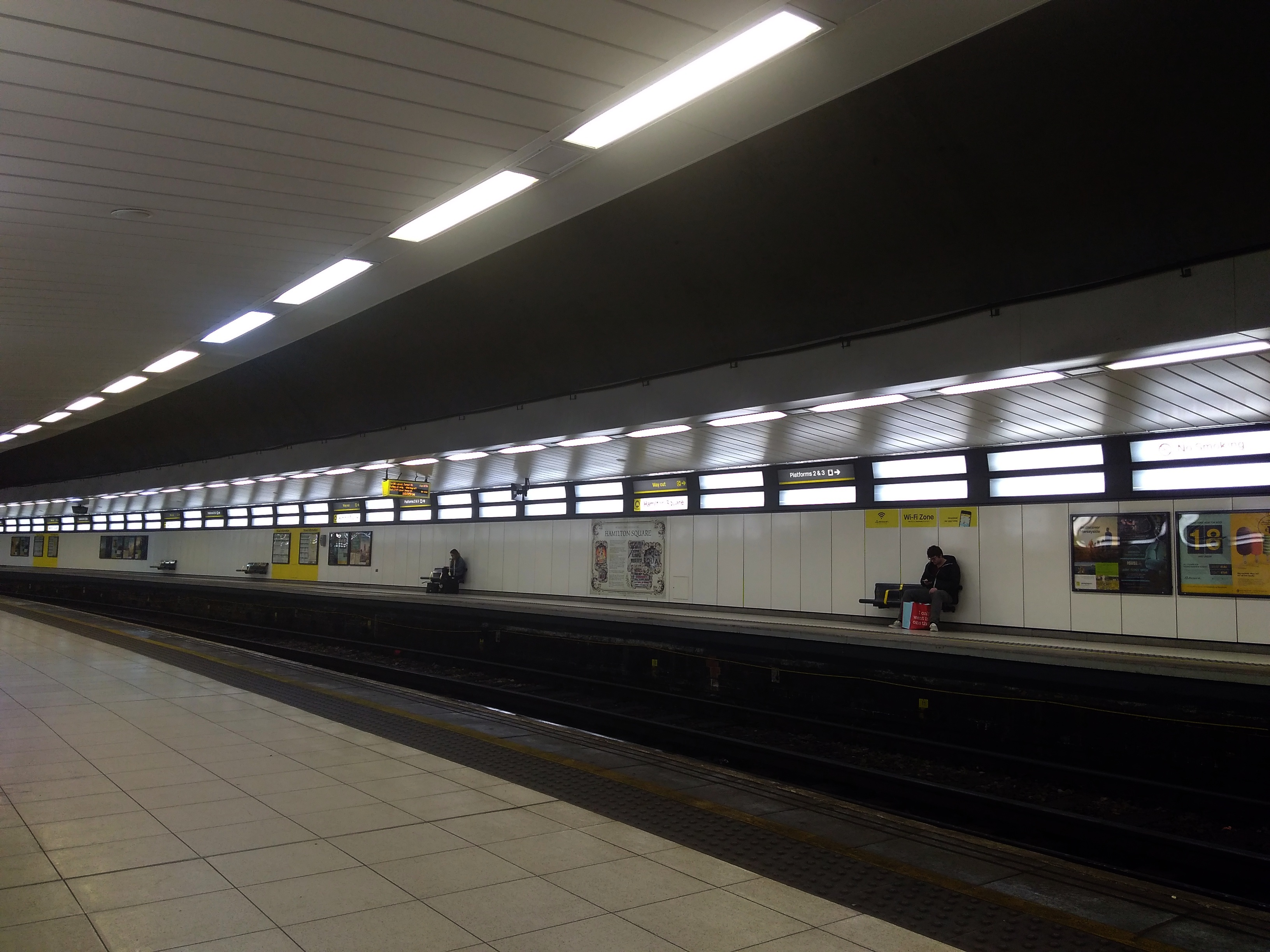
- Platforms 1 and 2.

General information
- Location: Birkenhead, Wirral; England
- Coordinates: 53.3947°N 3.0139°W
- Grid reference: SJ326891
- Managed by: Merseyrail
- Transit authority: Merseytravel
- Platforms: 3

Other information
- Station code: BKQ
- Fare zone: B1
- Classification: DfT category D

History
- Original company: Mersey Railway
- Pre-grouping: Mersey Railway
- Post-grouping: Mersey Railway; London Midland Region of British Railways

Key dates
- 1886: Opened
- 1903: Electrified
- 1977: Extended
- 29 September 2014: Closed (Refurbishment)
- 27 March 2015: Reopened

Passengers
- 2020/21: ▼0.530 million
- Interchange: ▼0.147 million
- 2021/22: ▲1.223 million
- Interchange: ▲0.290 million
- 2022/23: ▲1.295 million
- Interchange: ▲0.329 million
- 2023/24: ▲1.394 million
- Interchange: ▲0.379 million
- 2024/25: ▲1.657 million
- Interchange: ▼0.331 million
Location
Notes
- Passenger statistics from the Office of Rail and Road

Hamilton Square on the Wirral Line

Birkenhead Hamilton Square railway station (commonly shortened to Hamilton Square station) serves the town of Birkenhead, in Merseyside, England, on the Wirral Line of the Merseyrail network. The station is close to Hamilton Square in Birkenhead.

Hamilton Square station showing the three platforms on the Merseyrail network

== History ==
Hamilton Square station was built by the Mersey Railway and opened on 1 February 1886. The station building was designed by G. E. Grayson in Italianate style, and has been designated as a Grade II listed building. It stood on that railway's original route from James Street station in Liverpool to Green Lane, later extended to Rock Ferry and Birkenhead Park. Just south of the station, the lines towards Rock Ferry and Birkenhead Park diverge; this junction was originally built as a flat crossing.

With the platforms being at a deep level, three hydraulic lifts were provided to transport passengers from ground level to the platforms and back, as well as flights of steps. Each lift was able to accommodate up to 100 passengers at a time and took 45 seconds to travel in each direction. The lifts were installed by Easton and Anderson.

By 1970 all-electric lifts were in operation, each with a capacity of 70 persons, these lifts having the Ward Leonard control system, which gave gentle stops and starts, blistering acceleration, and a fast transit time.

The first electric train passenger service ran through the station on 3 May 1903, with a 650 V DC fourth rail system and Mersey Railway electric units built by Westinghouse. Despite the journey being far quicker than travel aboard the Mersey Ferry service, passengers were not keen on travelling underground due to the smoke from the previous coal-powered steam locomotives. A Frequent electric trains sign was erected on the outside of the station's large hydraulic lift tower (slightly below the position of the present sign) to publicise these cleaner trains. The booking hall had a central ticket office, as was popular on the London Underground.

In the 1970s, as part of the expansion programme of the Merseyrail network, a burrowing junction was built at Hamilton Square so that trains heading towards New Brighton and West Kirby did not have to cross the path of trains coming from Rock Ferry on the flat crossing. Along with the construction of the loop tunnel in the centre of Liverpool, this improved the capacity of the Wirral Line, allowing increased train frequencies. The burrowing junction required the construction of a new 2,037 ft (621 m)-long tunnel, dug at a depth of between 77 ft (23 m) and 113 ft (34 m), between Hamilton Square and Lorn Street and directly beneath the Town Hall and Market Street.

As part of the project, Hamilton Square gained a new platform (Platform 3) for New Brighton and West Kirby services, and the rest of the station was refurbished. The signal box was closed on 9 May 1977, with signalling operation transferred to James Street, when Hamilton Square's burrowing junction and platform came into use. Unfortunately, this investment coincided with the significant decline in employment in Central Liverpool and surrounding areas, patronage fell, and the peak hour train service provided nowadays through the extensive grade-separated tunnel junctions is notably less than was provided in the 1960s-70s, just using the flat junction.

=== 2014/15 refurbishment ===
In August 2014, it was announced that Hamilton Square was to be the fourth station to be refurbished as part of the £40 million investment from Network Rail which would see all Merseyrail Underground Stations excluding Conway Park refurbished. This included the refurbishment of platforms, concourses and the booking hall. The entire station closed on 29 September 2014 and reopened on 27 March 2015.

During the refurbishment, in November 2014 it was revealed that old historic posters dating back to the 1940s, 1950s and 1960s were found underneath the old wall cladding. These included posters promoting New Brighton, an advert for a Circus and old news stories from the Liverpool Echo. The posters however could not be saved due to their poor condition and were left where they were. However, during the reopening, artwork documenting the old posters was unveiled on Platform 1 of the station.

== Facilities ==
The station is staffed, during all opening hours, and has platform CCTV. There are toilets, secure parking for 12 cycles, a payphone, an ATM, booking office, a ticket machine and live departure and arrival screens, for passenger information. The station does not have a car park though there is a drop-off point. Step-free access to the platforms, for wheelchairs and prams, is possible, via the lifts. The station also has steps to an exit on Shore Road, once open normally but now only used in emergencies. The station also has a shop, in the main booking hall, which opened in 2007 and which sells tickets and snacks. On 22 October 2015, free Wi-Fi was installed and introduced at the station.

== Services ==
During Monday-Saturday daytime, trains operate at least every five minutes to James Street and around the Liverpool city centre loop. In the other direction, trains operate every 15 minutes to each of New Brighton, West Kirby and Chester, and every 30 minutes to Ellesmere Port. At other times, trains operate every 30 minutes to each of these four destinations, giving a service every 5–10 minutes to Liverpool. These services are all provided by Merseyrail's fleet of Class 777 EMUs.

== Gallery ==
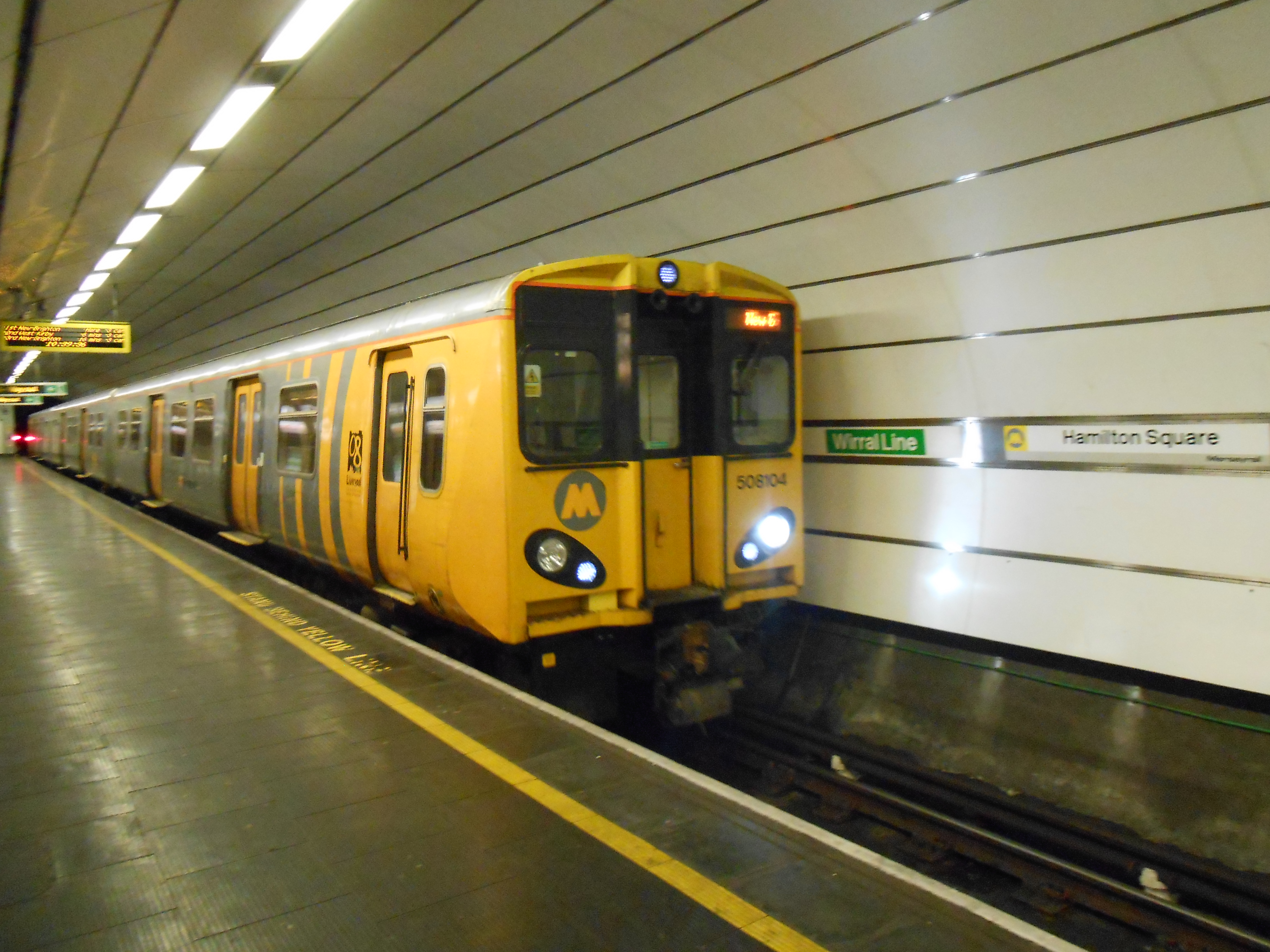
A Merseyrail Class 508 at platform 3

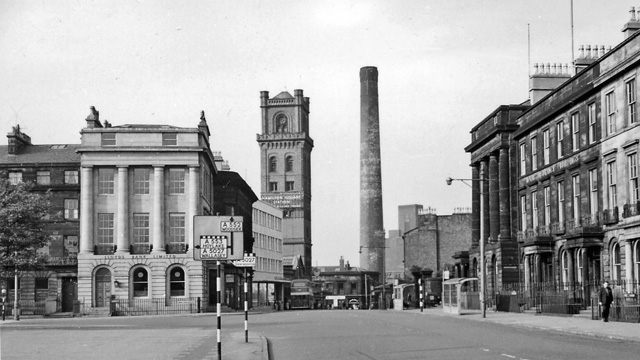
The station tower in 1961

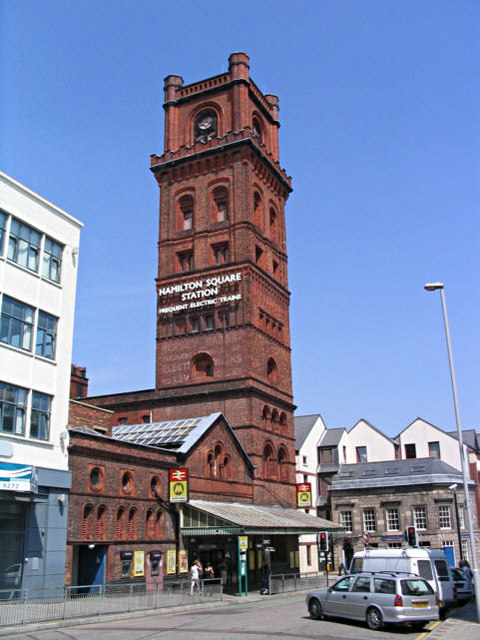
The station tower

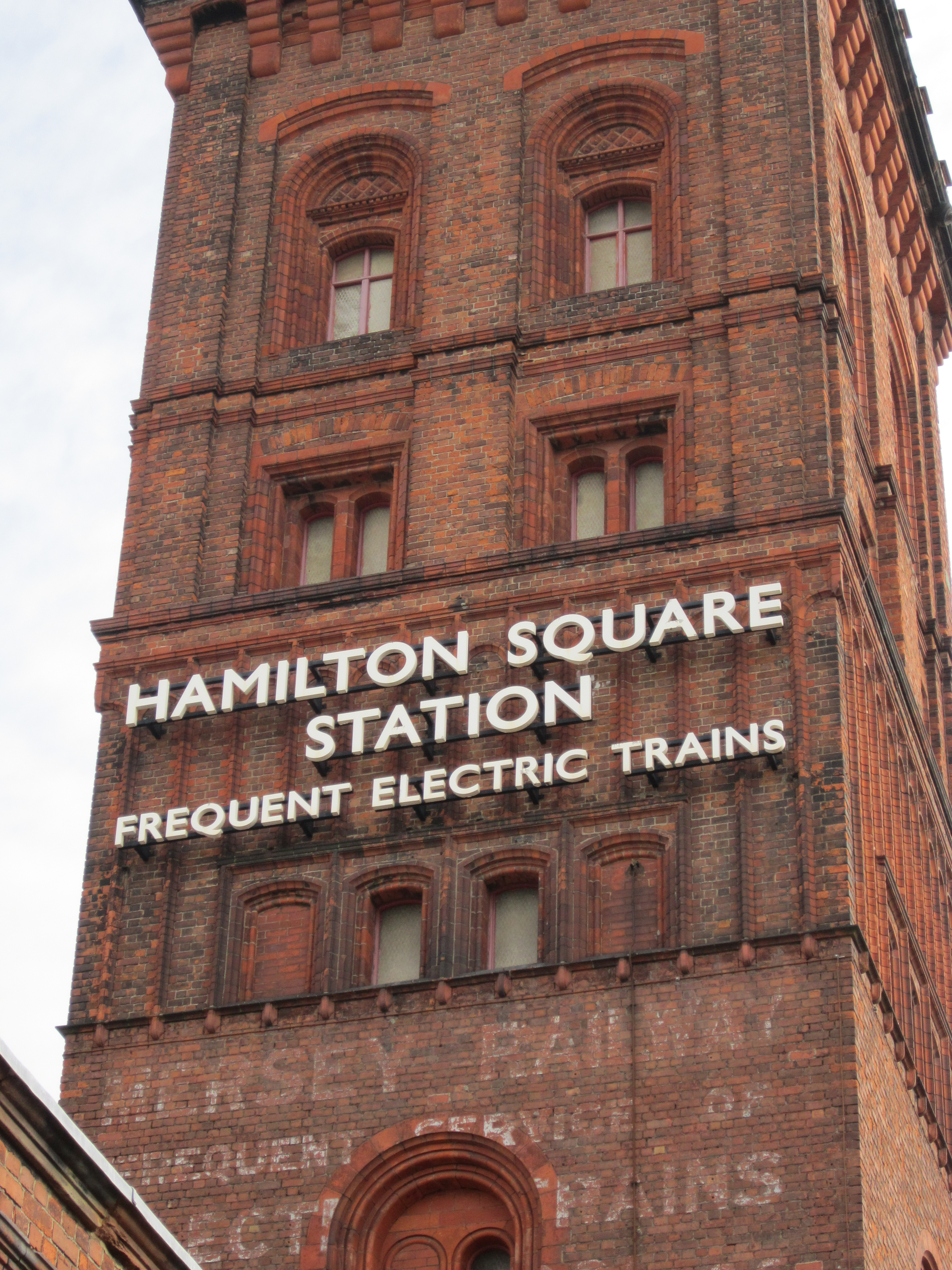
Signage on the station tower

== See also ==
- Listed buildings in Birkenhead
- List of works by Grayson and Ould
- List of underground stations of the Merseyrail network

| Preceding station | National Rail | Following station |
|---|---|---|
| Birkenhead Central towards Chester or Ellesmere Port | Merseyrail; Wirral Line; Ellesmere Port/Chester | James Street towards Liverpool Central |
| Conway Park towards New Brighton or West Kirby | Merseyrail; Wirral Line; New Brighton/West Kirby | James Street towards Liverpool Central |
