= Mersey Railway =

Former railway operator in England

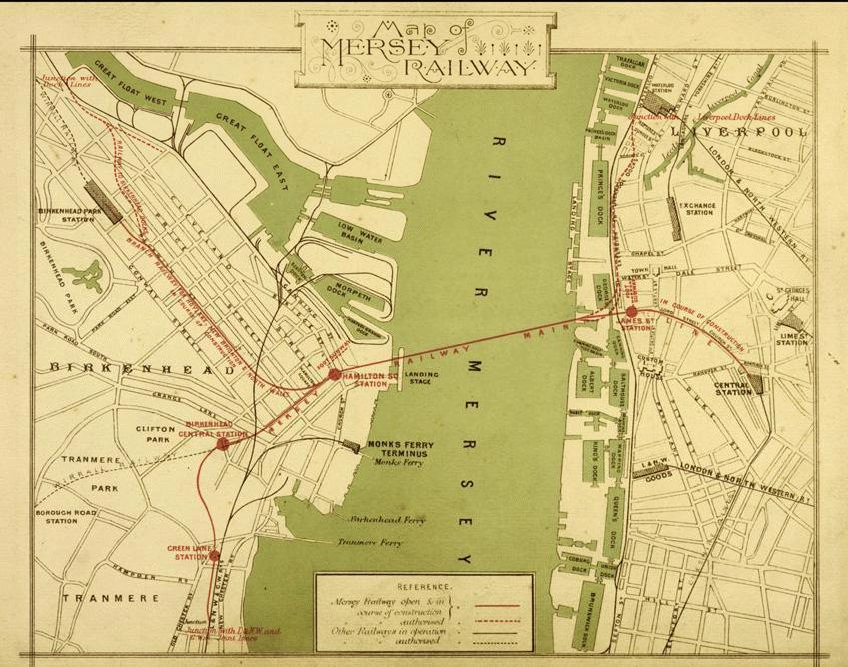

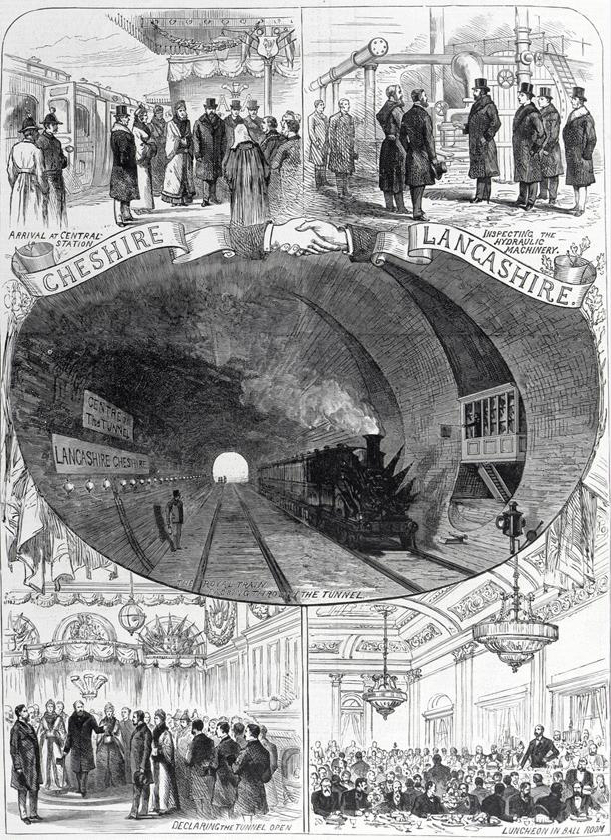
- The Illustrated London News showing the opening of the Mersey Railway Tunnel

Overview
- Dates of operation: 1886–31 December 1947
- Successor: British Railways

Technical
- Track gauge: 4 ft 8 1/2 in (1,435 mm)

The Mersey Railway was the passenger railway connecting the communities of Liverpool and Birkenhead, England. It is currently a part of the Merseyrail network. It was extended further into the Wirral Peninsula, which lies on the opposite bank of the River Mersey to Liverpool. Both sides of the river were connected via the Mersey Railway Tunnel. The railway opened in 1886 with four stations using steam locomotives hauling unheated wooden carriages; in the next six years the line was extended with the opening of three more stations. Using the first tunnel under the Mersey, the line is the world's oldest underground railway outside London.

Because the steam locomotives created a polluted atmosphere in the tunnel despite the forced ventilation system, many passengers reverted to using the river ferries making the railway bankrupt by 1900. Recovery came after the railway adopted electric traction in 1903. The Mersey Railway remained independent after the railway grouping of 1923, although it became closely integrated with the electric train services operated by the London, Midland and Scottish Railway over the former Wirral Railway routes after 1938. The Mersey Railway was nationalised, along with most other British railway companies, in 1948.

== History ==
=== Origins ===
Records exist of a ferry service across the River Mersey between Birkenhead on the west bank and Liverpool on the east since the Middle Ages. In 1332 the monks of Birkenhead Priory were granted exclusive rights to operate a ferry; following the dissolution of the monasteries these rights passed through a number of operators eventually to the township of Birkenhead.

Mersey Railway Act 1866
- Act of Parliament
- Parliament of the United Kingdom
- Long title: An Act for the Construction of Railways whereby Liverpool will be connected with Birkenhead.
- Citation: 29 & 30 Vict. c. cxxxix

Dates
- Royal assent: 28 June 1866

Mersey Railway Act 1871
- Act of Parliament
- Parliament of the United Kingdom
- Long title: An Act to authorise the Mersey Railway Company to divert their authorised Line and to connect it with existing Railways at Liverpool and Birkenhead; and for other purposes.
- Citation: 34 & 35 Vict. c. cci

Dates
- Royal assent: 14 August 1871

Text of statute as originally enacted

It is recorded that Marc Isambard Brunel suggested a road tunnel when designing the Birkenhead docks and from the 1850s a railway tunnel under the Mersey was proposed several times. The Mersey Pneumatic Railway Company received permission for a single line pneumatic railway in the Mersey Railway Act 1866 (29 & 30 Vict. c. cxxxix) but failed to raise the necessary capital. Renamed the Mersey Railway Company, they were given the necessary permissions in the Mersey Railway Act 1871 (34 & 35 Vict. c. cci) for an orthodox two track railway connecting the Birkenhead Railway near their Rock Ferry station through a tunnel under the Mersey to an underground station serving Liverpool. However the company found it difficult to raise the necessary funds until Major Samuel Isaac undertook to build the railway in 1881. He contracted construction to John Waddell, who appointed Charles Douglas Fox and James Brunlees as Engineers.

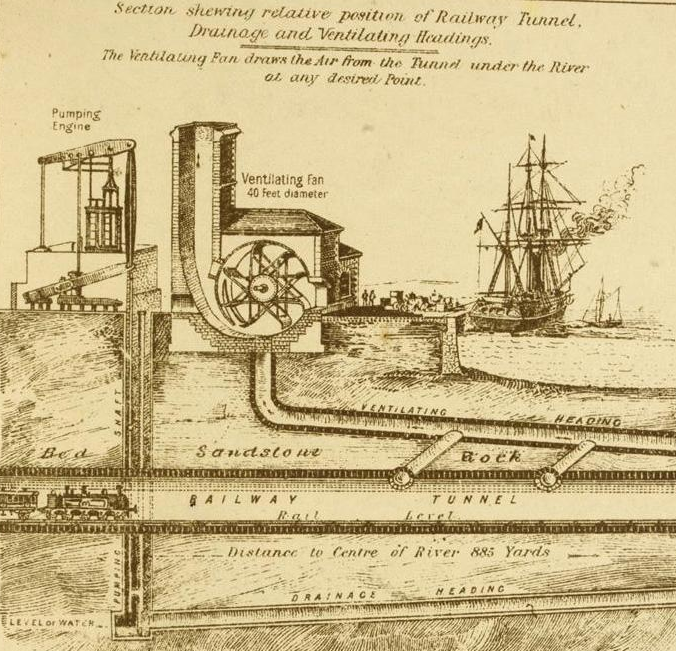
1886 illustration showing the ventilation and drainage system

Construction of the river tunnel started from two 180 feet (55 m) deep shafts, one on each bank, containing water pumps. Three tunnels were to be dug, one for the two tracks, a drainage tunnel and a ventilation tunnel. A 7 feet 2 inches (2.18 m) diameter ventilation tunnel was dug as the pilot heading. Some 38 million bricks were used for the construction of the main tunnel. When the tunnel was opened, fans on both banks changed the air in the tunnel every seven minutes.

The geology of the riverbed meant that the plans were changed and at the deepest section the drainage and ventilation tunnels combined. The grade on the Liverpool side was increased to 1 in 27. Estimates of the influx of water varied from 5,000 imp gal (23,000 L) to 36,000 imp gal (160,000 L) per minute; after the works were completed the maximum pumped out of the tunnel has been 9,000 imp gal (41,000 L) per minute. There were two pumping stations, Shore Road Pumping Station on the Birkenhead bank near Hamilton Square and Georges Dock Pumping Station on Mann Island on the Liverpool Bank. The railway's workshop was built next to Birkenhead Central; stabling was also provided at Birkenhead Park.

=== Opening and extensions ===
The Mersey Railway was formally opened on 20 January 1886 and public services started on 1 February. The route had four new stations: Green Lane, Birkenhead Central and Hamilton Square in Birkenhead and James Street station in Liverpool. Green Lane and Birkenhead Central were below ground level in open cuttings whereas James Street and Hamilton Square were deep underground and accessed by lifts.

In 1888 a branch tunnel to Birkenhead Park station opened, with a connection to the Wirral Railway. This was followed in 1891 by an extension from Green Lane to bay platforms at the Birkenhead Railway's Rock Ferry station, and in 1892 the tunnel was extended from James Street to a new underground station at Liverpool Central.

The railway opened with steam locomotives hauling four-wheeled 27 feet (8.2 m)-long wooden carriages, with first-, second- and third-class accommodation provided in unheated compartments. In 1900 in the peak periods trains left the Rock Ferry terminus every 7 1/2 minutes and the Birkenhead Park terminus every 15 minutes, giving a train every 5 minutes between Hamilton Square and Liverpool Central. At off-peak times this was reduced to a train every 7 1/2 minutes, alternately from the Rock Ferry and Birkenhead Park branches. The scheduled journey time between Rock Ferry and Central was 14 minutes; between Birkenhead Park and Central, 10 minutes.

As well as some through working of carriages from the Wirral Railway at Birkenhead Park, in the summer of 1899 a through service worked from Liverpool to Folkestone Harbour; carriages were taken to Rock Ferry, and there attached to a GWR Paddington express train; the carriages were slipped at Reading before being taken on to Folkestone attached to another train. Connecting ferries and trains allowed Paris to be reached in under 15 hours.

=== Electrification ===
The traffic peaked in 1890, when ten million passengers were carried, and then declined. Two years previously the company had been declared bankrupt and receivers appointed, because it was unable to pay the charges on its debt. Steam locomotives running at five-minute headways left a dirty atmosphere in the tunnel that the mechanical ventilation was unable to remove, so many passengers preferred the ferries.

Mersey Railway Act 1900
- Act of Parliament
- Parliament of the United Kingdom
- Long title: An Act to authorise the working of the Mersey Railway and railways connected therewith by electricity to regulate the capital of the Mersey Railway Company and for other purposes.
- Citation: 63 & 64 Vict. c. cxxxiv

Dates
- Royal assent: 30 July 1900

Text of statute as originally enacted

Some other urban railways had been constructed for electric traction: in 1890 the City and South London underground tube had opened with electric traction, followed in 1893 by the more local Liverpool Overhead Railway. Plans for electrification of the Mersey Railway in 1895 were shelved because the company and its investors were fighting in the courts. In 1897 a new board of directors was elected, and in 1898, £500 was released for further expert advice that recommended electrification at a cost of £260,000 (equivalent to £29,220,000 in 2025). By then, the railway had attracted the attention of George Westinghouse, an American in the UK looking for business for his UK works, the British Westinghouse Electric and Manufacturing Co. Ltd, that opened at Trafford Park in 1899. Westinghouse considered the railway would be profitable with electric traction and undertook to fund the project, promising to complete in eighteen months. Electrification was approved by Parliament in the Mersey Railway Act 1900 (63 & 64 Vict. c. cxxxiv), which also terminated the bankruptcy, and in July 1901 the Westinghouse contract was signed.

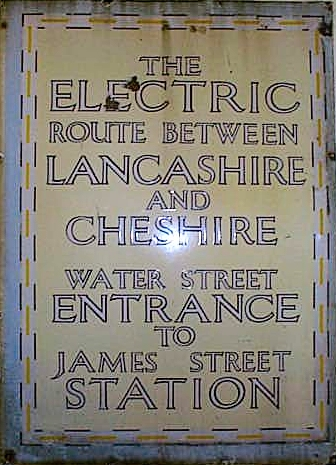
Sign advertising electric services at James Street.

All electrical equipment was shipped from the US, including power system plant equipment. A power station was built at the Shore Road pumping station and was designed to accommodate the extension of electrification to the Wirral Railway, although that did not occur until 1938. The conductor rails were fed direct, without any distribution. Four-rail 600 V DC electrification was installed, with the positive outer rail set 22 inches (560 mm) from the running rail. The new electric multiple units, initially marshalled as 2-car or 4-car sets, had British-built wooden bodies on US bogies. A total of 24 motor cars and 33 trailer cars were provided. The driving positions controlled all the motors on the train by the means of a low voltage control signal.

After inspection by the Board of Trade, the line was approved as fit for traffic on 3 April 1903. The last steam trains ran on Saturday 2 May and the current to the electrified rails was switched on at 3:30 am. At 4:53 am the first electric train arrived at Liverpool Central, and for the Sunday morning trains ran at 3-minute intervals without passengers. Passengers were admitted when the advertised Sunday service started at noon.

The stations were cleaned, whitewashed and electrically lit. A service was provided every three minutes from Liverpool Central to Hamilton Square and journeys were faster: Central to Rock Ferry was eleven minutes, down from fifteen minutes and the Central to Birkenhead Park journey was reduced by two minutes, down to eight minutes.

There was a maximum of four cars per train in 1904, which was raised to five cars in 1909. In 1923, automatic signalling was commissioned at Liverpool Central and in 1927 the island platform was widened, the work being completed in a weekend. The maximum number of cars in a train was raised to six in 1936, after the tunnels at the east end of Liverpool Central had been extended.

=== Wirral Railway ===
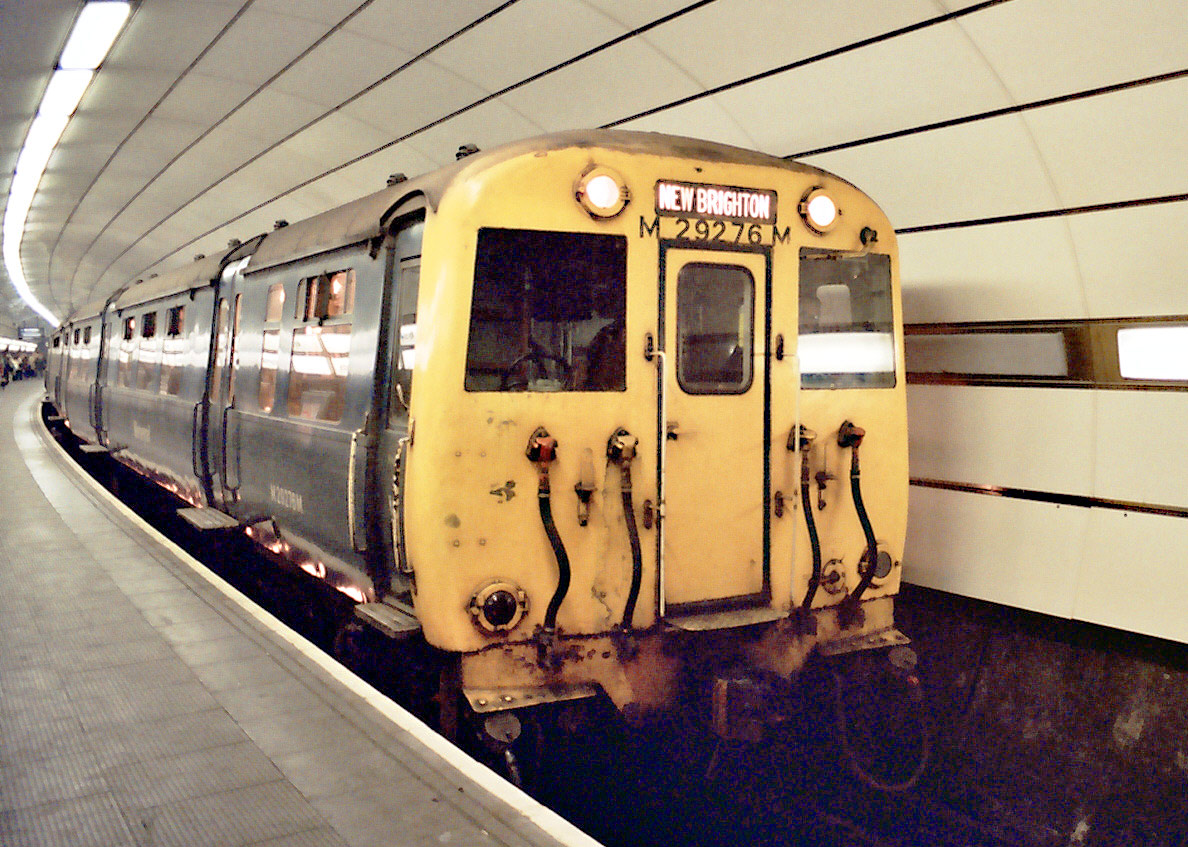
A 1938 Class 503 unit in Liverpool.

As a local railway the Mersey Railway remained independent in the 1923 grouping, although the Wirral Railway became part of the London, Midland and Scottish Railway (LMS). The Wirral had authority to electrify its lines, but had not done so, and passengers making through journeys had to change at Birkenhead Park. In 1926 discussions started on electrification and through running. The Wirral section was electrified with a DC third rail system, the Mersey Railway retaining its fourth rail but moving the positive conductor to 16 inches (410 mm) from the running rail. The Mersey Railway electric multiple units were modified to run to the Wirral railway, and at the same time heaters and air compressors were added.

In 1938 the LMS introduced new lightweight three car multiple units that were later, under British Rail, to be classified Class 503.

=== Nationalisation and legacy ===
In 1948, on nationalisation of the railways, the Mersey Railway became the Mersey section of the London Midland Region. In 1956 these trains were replaced by Class 503 units, similar to the LMS Class 502 design, and the fourth rail removed. The last of the American-designed cars was withdrawn a year later.

British Railways (Mersey Railway Extensions) Act 1968
- Act of Parliament
- Parliament of the United Kingdom
- Long title: An Act to empower the British Railways Board to construct works and to acquire lands; and for other purposes.
- Citation: 1968 c. xxxv

Dates
- Royal assent: 26 July 1968

Text of statute as originally enacted

A single track loop line was built between 1972 and 1977, and since 1977 trains from James Street have travelled round the loop calling at Moorfields, Liverpool Lime Street and a new platform at Liverpool Central before returning to James Street. The original two platforms at Liverpool Central were reused as part of the Northern Line. The tunnel and railway are still in use today as part of the Wirral Line of the Merseyrail commuter rail network.

In the city of Liverpool—

- Work No. 1 A railway (1 mile 1,748 yards in length) wholly in the city commencing by a junction with the Mersey Railway between Birkenhead and Liverpool below a point 150 yards south-west of the junction of Irwell Street and Mann Island and terminating by a junction with the Mersey Railway below a point 120 yards west of the junction of South John Street and Lord Street.

In the county borough of Birkenhead—

- Work No. 2 A railway (712 yards in length) wholly in the borough commencing by a junction with the Mersey Railway between Liverpool and West Kirby below a point 95 yards north-east of the junction of Bridge Street and Hamilton Street and terminating by a junction with the Mersey Railway below a point 90 yards north-west of the junction of Argyle Street and Lorn Street.

— Section 5, British Railways (Mersey Railway Extensions) Act 1968 (c. xxxv)

Shore Road Pumping Station in Birkenhead was a museum until closure sometime before 2014. Georges Dock Pumping Station on Mann Island in Liverpool is a grade II listed building.

== Rolling stock ==
=== Steam locomotives ===
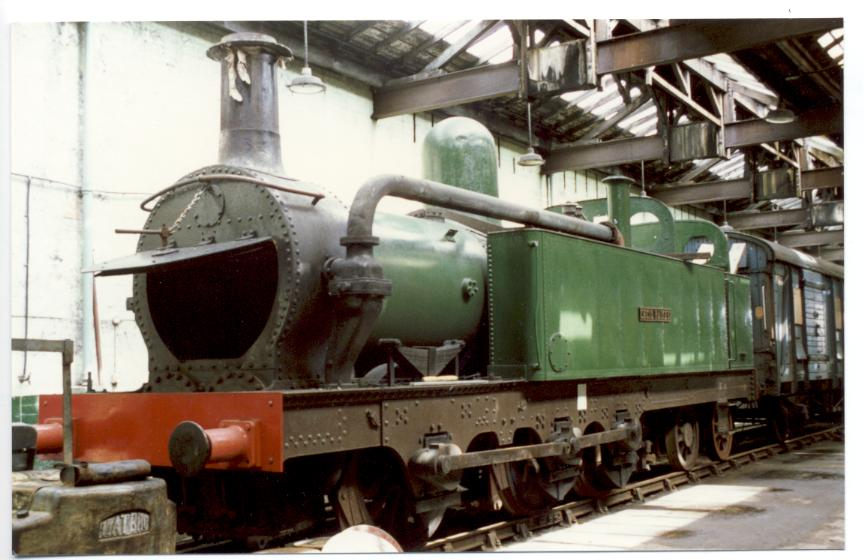
Mersey Railway 0-6-4T No. 5 "Cecil Raikes" at Steamport, Southport in May 1988, showing the condensing pipes

For the opening of the line, eight powerful 0-6-4 tank locomotives were obtained from Beyer, Peacock and Company, fitted with condensing apparatus for working in the tunnel. Designated as Class I, a ninth followed within six months. Beyer Peacock also built six 2-6-2T tank locomotives in 1887 (Class II) and three further 2-6-2T (Class III) were built by Kitson and Company in 1892.

The 0-6-4Ts were built with steam and vacuum brakes and steam reversing gear and weighed 67 long tons (68 t). The 2-6-2Ts were fitted with vacuum brakes only; those built by Beyer weighed 62 1/2 long tons (63.5 t) and Kitson's 67 1/2 long tons (68.6 t).

As electrification progressed, the old rolling stock was advertised for sale. An attempt to sell the 18 locomotives and 96 carriages by auction in June 1903 proved unsuccessful – the auctioneer had to remind the bidders that he was not selling scrap. It was September before the first locomotive was sold; it would take another two years to sell all-bar-one of the locomotives. The last locomotive — which had been retained for working permanent way trains — was sold in January 1908.

The first to be sold was No. 5 Cecil Raikes, which was bought by Shipley Collieries for £750. They came back and bought No. 8 for £650; but not before Alexandra (Newport and South Wales) Docks and Railway had bought all six of the Class II locomotives for £3,450. They became ADR 6–11 (not in order). Alexandra Docks later bought four more locomotives: Three 0-6-4T (Nos. 2, 3 and 6), and one Class III 2-6-2T (No. 16), these becoming 24–22 and 25. All ten ADR locomotives passed to the Great Western Railway in January 1922, and were withdrawn between January 1923 and May 1932.

The other two Class III locomotives were bought by Whitwood Colliery for £1,240.

The last four locomotives (Nos. 1, 7, 9 and 4) were sold to J & A Brown (as their Nos. 5–8) for use on the Richmond Vale railway line in New South Wales, Australia. No. 4 Gladstone had been retained by the Mersey Railway until 1907 for departmental use, but was then replaced by Metropolitan Railway A Class (4-4-0T) No. 61, built by Beyer Peacock. This was replaced in 1927 by an earlier Metropolitan Railway 4-4-0T, No. 7.

Two of the Class I locomotive have been preserved: No. 5 Cecil Raikes is preserved at the Museum of Liverpool; and No. 1 The Major is preserved at the NSW Rail Museum, Thirlmere, New South Wales.

=== Locomotive-hauled coaching stock ===
Between 1904 and 1907 thirteen four-wheeled gas-lit coaches were sold to the Liskeard and Looe Railway. (Note: Photographs can be seen Mitchell & Smith 1998, nos. 92 and 93 and Messenger 2001, p. 137.) Built by the Ashbury Railway Carriage and Iron Company between 1885 and 1888, the sale price was between £20 and £70 each. In 1912, the six surviving examples were sold on to the Rhondda and Swansea Bay Railway.

=== Electric multiple units ===
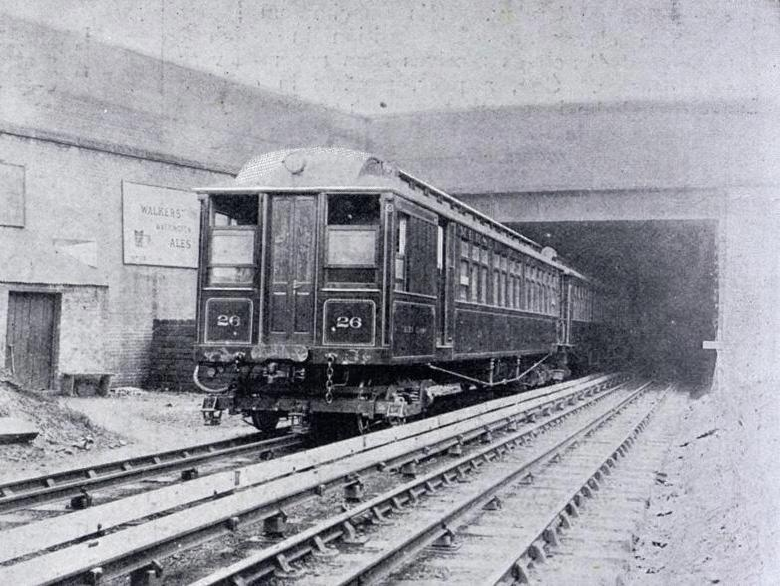
Electric multiple unit on the Mersey Railway

In 1903 24 motor cars and 33 trailers were provided by Westinghouse. The stock was of an American design, with a clerestory roof and open gated ends. Unheated accommodation was in saloons and the wooden bodies were British built, and the bogies had been made by Baldwin Locomotive Works in America. First- and third-class cars were provided, the first-class seats being of natural rattan and the third-class seats being moulded plywood. The livery was maroon with white roofs and "Mersey Railway" in gold leaf on the upper fascia panels. Air brakes were provided with storage reservoirs that were recharged from static compressors at the terminal stations. The motor cars were powered with Westinghouse motors controlled by the Westinghouse low voltage multiple unit train control system.

An additional four trailers were received in 1908 followed in 1923 by two more motor cars and in 1925 a new five-car train. To allow the introduction of 6-car trains in 1936, ten trailer units were ordered. The later cars did not have a clerestory roof, (Note: A clerestory roof has a raised centre section with small windows and/or ventilators.) but any car could work in multiple with any other car.

When the cars were modified to run to the Wirral railway, heaters and air compressors were added. The cars were replaced by vehicles similar to the Wirral Railway units in 1956–57.

Car no. 1, a first-class motor coach, was destroyed in a fire at Derby Litchurch Lane Works, where it had been taken for overhaul in preparation for restoration and preservation.

== Preservation ==
Only two of the Class I locomotive have been preserved: No. 5 Cecil Raikes is preserved at the Museum of Liverpool; and no. 1 The Major is preserved at the NSW Rail Museum, Thirlmere, New South Wales, Australia.

== References and notes ==
=== Bibliography ===
- Atkins, C. P. (March 1976a). "The Mersey Railway tank locomotives—1". Railway World. Shepperton, Surrey: Ian Allan: 96–99.
- Atkins, C. P. (April 1976b). "The Mersey Railway tank locomotives—2". Railway World. Shepperton, Surrey: Ian Allan: 160–164.
- Casserley, H.C.; Johnston, Stuart W. (1966). Locomotives at the Grouping 4: Great Western Railway. London: Ian Allan. OCLC 35733208.
- Fox, F. (1886). "The Mersey Railway". Minutes of the Proceedings. 86 (1886). Institution of Civil Engineers: 40. doi:10.1680/imotp.1886.21162.
- Lee, Charles E. (September 1936). "The Mersey Railway". The Railway Magazine. Vol. 79, no. 471. Westminster, London: The Railway Publishing Company Ltd. pp. 157–163.
- Marsden, Colin J. (2008). The DC Electrics. Ian Allan. ISBN 978-0-86093-615-2.
- Messenger, Michael John (May 2001). Caradon & Looe: The Canal, Railways and Mines. Twelveheads Press. ISBN 978-0-906294-46-8.
- Mitchell, Vic; Smith, Keith (1 September 1998). Branch Line to Looe. Middleton Press. ISBN 978-1-901706-22-2.
- Parkin, Geoffrey William (1965). The Mersey Railway. Lingfield: Oakwood. OCLC 8654172.
- Reed, P.J.T. (April 1966). Absorbed Engines 1922-1947. The Locomotives of the Great Western Railway. Vol. Part 10. Lichfield: Railway Correspondence and Travel Society. OCLC 41540564.
- Jackson, Alan (1992). The Railway Dictionary: An A-Z of Railway Terminology. Sutton Publishing. ISBN 07509-00385.
- "Completion of the Mersey Railway Tunnel", Scientific American Supplement, vol. 33, no. 841, 13 February 1892

=== Historic publications ===
- Rich, W. E. (1886). "The Hydraulic Passenger Lifts at the Underground Stations of the Mersey Railway. (Including Appendix and Plate at Back of Volume)". Minutes of the Proceedings. 86 (1886): 60. doi:10.1680/imotp.1886.21163.
- Rowlandson, C. A. (1896). "The Bold Street Extension Tunnel and Central Low-Level Station of the Mersey Railway". Minutes of the Proceedings. 123 (1896): 357. doi:10.1680/imotp.1896.19672., link with images

Next crossing upstream		Next crossing downstream
Runcorn Railway Bridge	Mersey Railway	Queensway Tunnel
