= Chester–Birkenhead line =

Railway in England

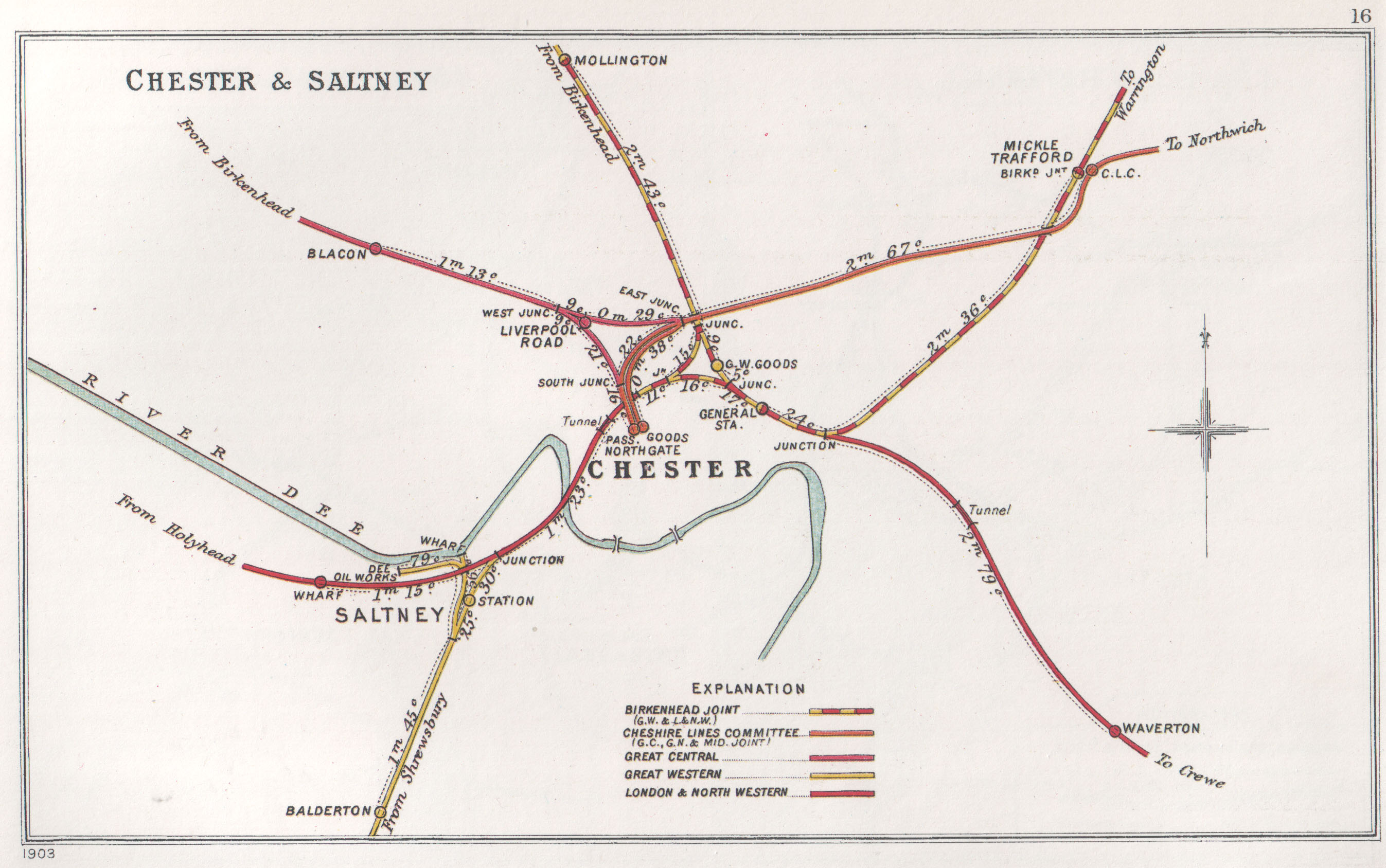
Railways around Chester

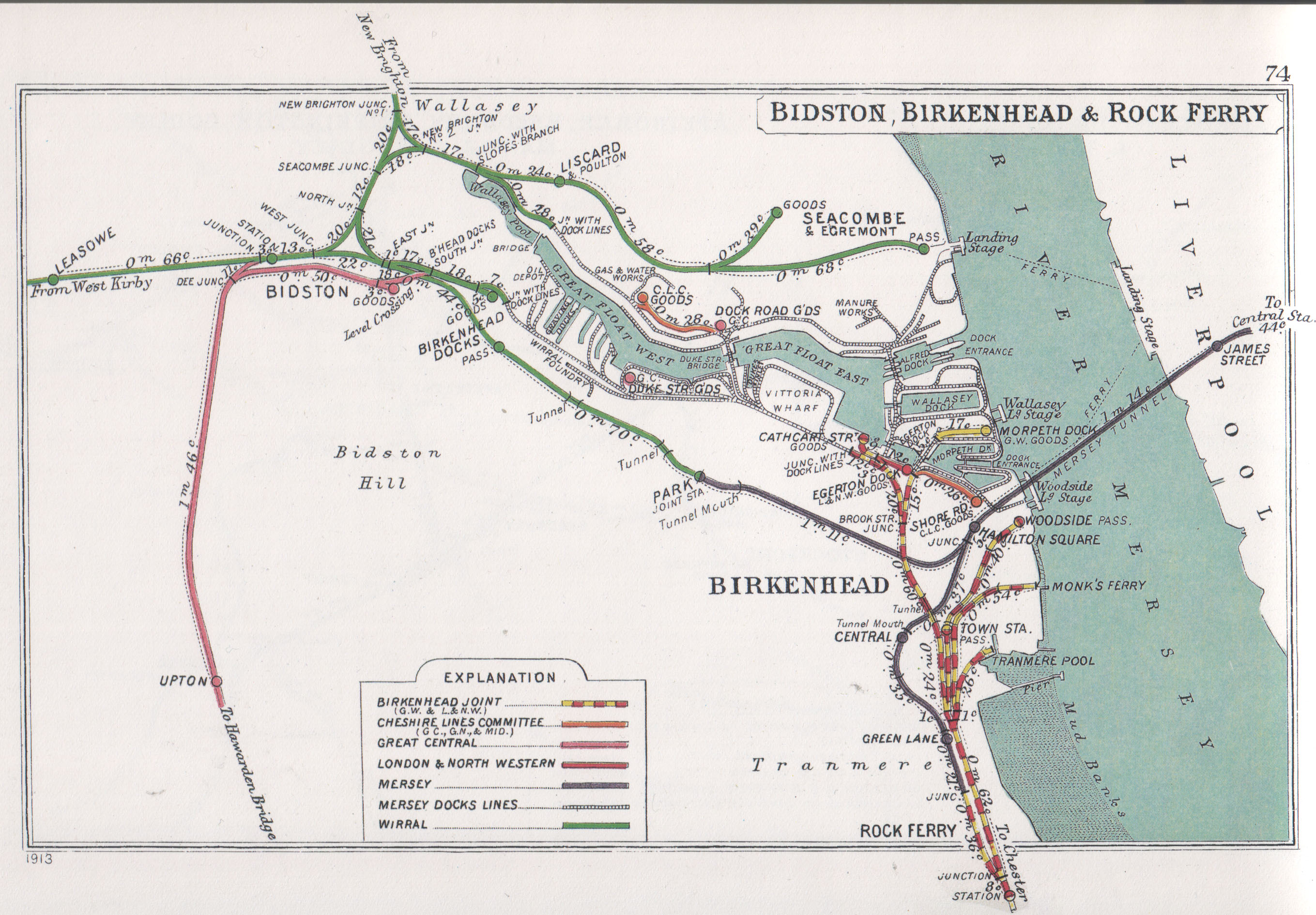
Railways around Birkenhead

The Chester–Birkenhead line runs from Chester to Birkenhead via Hooton. Today, it forms part of the Wirral line network, a commuter rail system operated by Merseyrail. The line was built by the Chester and Birkenhead Railway and opened on 23 September 1840. On 22 July 1847 the railway merged with the Birkenhead, Lancashire and Cheshire Junction Railway which was later renamed to Birkenhead Railway.

== History ==
=== Early proposals ===
The directors of the Grand Junction Railway had originally intended to reach Birkenhead, as a means of connecting to the docks on the River Mersey that was cheaper than getting directly to Liverpool, which would have involved an expensive crossing of the Mersey. The schemes to do so were turned down by Parliament, and the Grand Junction settled for connecting to the Liverpool and Manchester Railway via the Warrington and Newton Railway at Earlestown instead. That was achieved in 1837.

=== Construction ===
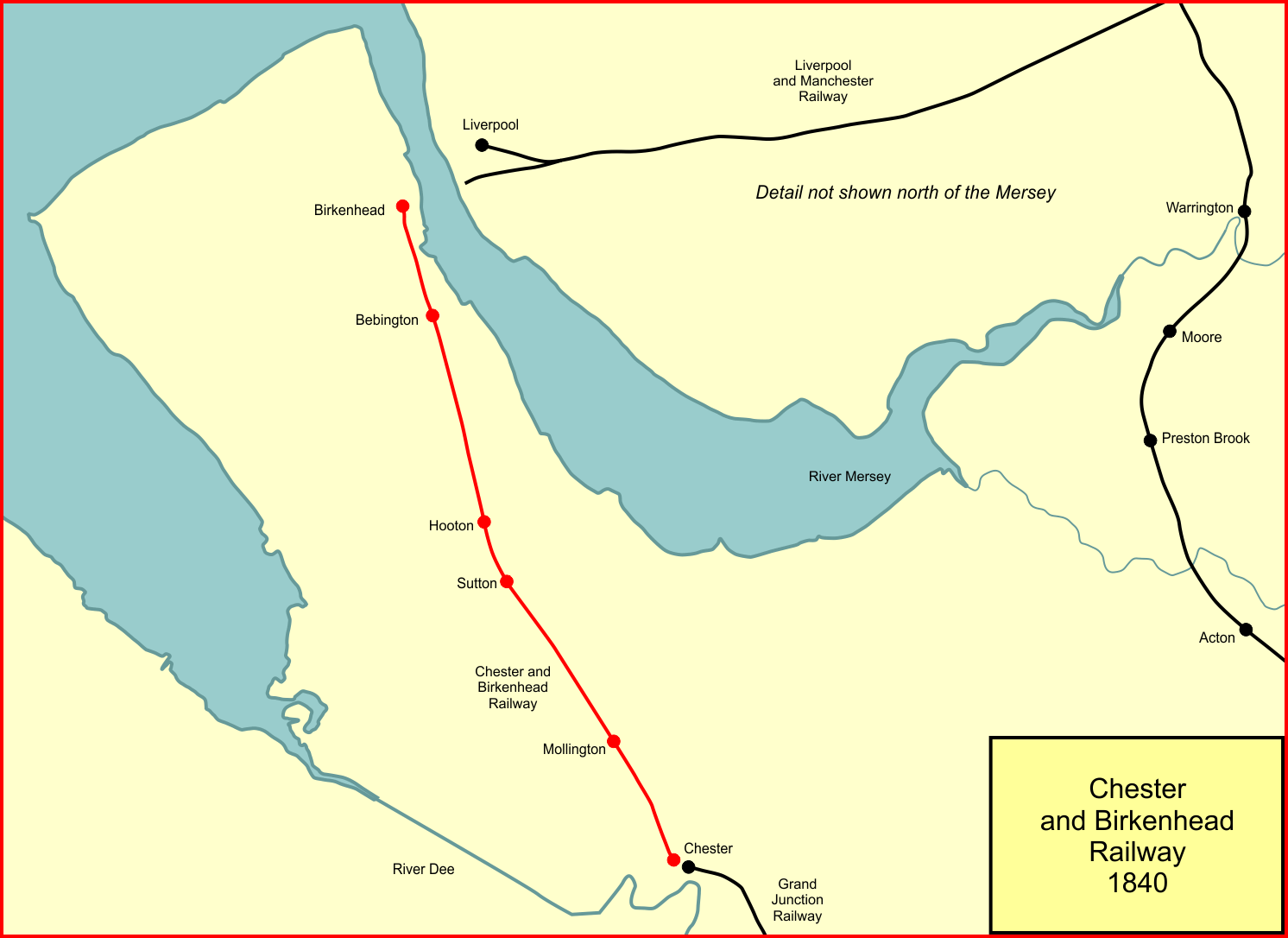
The Chester and Birkenhead Railway in 1840

In 1836 two schemes for a railway from Chester to Birkenhead gained support, and they went to the 1837 session of Parliament. The Chester and Birkenhead Railway would run from a junction with the Chester–Crewe line (as yet unbuilt) at Chester and would serve the several ferry terminals in Birkenhead, and it survived the parliamentary process.

Chester and Birkenhead Railway Act 1837
- Act of Parliament
- Parliament of the United Kingdom
- Long title: An Act for making a Railway from the City of Chester to Birkenhead.
- Citation: 7 Will. 4 & 1 Vict. c. cvii

Dates
- Royal assent: 12 July 1837

Other legislation
- Repealed by: Birkenhead, Lancashire and Cheshire Junction Railway Act 1852

Status: Repealed

The Chester and Birkenhead Railway was authorised by the Chester and Birkenhead Railway Act 1837 (7 Will. 4 & 1 Vict. c. cvii) on 12 July 1837, with capital of £250,000. It was to be a single line; no intermediate stations had been planned at this stage. George Stephenson was the engineer.

The line was built as a single line with structures made suitable for later doubling of the line. The track gauge was to be 4 ft 9 in (1,448 mm), in common with the Crewe line. By the end of 1843 Stephenson' estimate of £250,000 was obviously going to be inadequate: the new estimate was now £512,973.

A directors' inspection train ran over the line on 10 September 1840 and the official opening took place on 22 September 1840. In the morning a staff and contractors' train made the round trip from Birkenhead to Chester; there were no passing places and no electric telegraph, so the official party of honoured guests had to wait at Birkenhead with no knowledge of whether the other train was returning on time. The ordinary public service started the next day, 23 September, with five passenger trains each way daily, three on Sundays. From 15 December some passing loops had been installed, and the train service frequency could be improved, to two-hourly.

=== First years until amalgamation ===
The Chester and Birkenhead Railway had assumed friendly relations with the Chester and Crewe Railway (C&CR), and it depended on the C&CR for access to the railway network. During the construction phase of the C&CR it simply ran out of money, and on 1 July 1840 it was taken over by the Grand Junction Railway. The GJR was in close partnership with the Liverpool and Manchester Railway, and were discouraged from collaborating with the Chester and Birkenhead, which the L&MR regarded as a competitor, so this was a serious setback; a number of collaborative schemes at Chester between the two companies were now unlikely to be possible. Each company would have its own station at Chester, although there would be a connecting line by-passing both. After the Chester–Crewe line was opened on 1 October 1840, the GJR train times at Chester were contrived to avoid any convenient change of trains to the C&BR, and this went as far as the Irish mails having to be carried across the street in Chester from one station to the other, even though there was a through track.

In the first year the company did not do well financially; this was partly due to very large interest payments on loans and ferry terminal rental, and disappointing income. The share price fell, and the company had to engage in some financial manipulation to generate necessary cash. It was obvious that large scale railways were going to be successful, and a merger of the Chester and Birkenhead Railway with the Chester and Holyhead Railway was proposed. The share transfer would have valued the Chester and Birkenhead Company at £496,762. This was less than the line had cost to construct, and other events drew the disparity to the attention of shareholders, so that the deal was suddenly rejected on 30 March 1845. and several board members resigned. Instead, the company was taken over by the Birkenhead, Lancashire and Cheshire Junction Railway in 1847.

=== Extensions in Birkenhead ===
The directors of the line were heavily involved with ferries at Birkenhead, and much energy was expended now in trying to get control of existing ferry companies, and securing the best railway access to the ferry terminals. The original Grange Lane terminus at Birkenhead had to be equidistant from the three ferry piers.

In October 1843 a contract was let to make a line in tunnel, diverging from just south of the terminus to the Monks Ferry, It opened to passenger trains on 23 October 1844, and the Grange Lane terminus closed to passengers the same day, being developed later as a mineral depot.

Chester and Birkenhead Railway Act 1845
- Act of Parliament
- Parliament of the United Kingdom
- Long title: An Act to authorize the Chester and Birkenhead Railway Company to extend the said Railway from Grange Lane to Bridge End, all in Birkenhead; and to amend the Acts relating to the said Railway.
- Citation: 8 & 9 Vict. c. xcix

Dates
- Royal assent: 21 July 1845y

Other legislation
- Repealed by: Birkenhead, Lancashire and Cheshire Junction Railway Act 1852

Status: Repealed

During the early history of the line extensive enlargement of the docks at Birkenhead was now being planned, and as there was crossover in directorships between the railway and maritime interests, the Chester and Birkenhead Railway proposed an extension, which became known as the Docks Extension Line, to a locality known as Bridge End. The necessary act of Parliament for the work, the Chester and Birkenhead Railway Act 1845 (8 & 9 Vict. c. xcix), received royal assent on 21 July 1845. The line was about a mile long, and was disproportionately expensive as it ran in newly developed residential areas required extensive bridging and retaining wall construction.

The docks extension opened on 5 April 1847. Because of the considerable extra traffic expected, double track was laid on the main line, and was completed in the same year.

Ferry arrangements which had seemed satisfactory in the earlier years were now seen to be commercially adverse, and the diversion of Chester to Liverpool passengers via Runcorn unsettled the Birkenhead commissioners. Following their pressure, an extension of the line to a new Woodside station in Birkenhead with direct access to the Woodside ferry was opened on 31 March 1878. The half mile line was known as the Birkenhead New Line; it was mostly in tunnel and deep cutting. The Monks Ferry branch (and the ferry itself) were closed on the next day, but the branch was later reopened to serve private sidings on it.

=== Upgrading ===
The line was seriously congested and it was decided to quadruple the tracks from Ledsham Junction to Birkenhead. This was completed in the period 1902 to 1908. Today the line has two tracks only.

The ordinary through trains from Birkenhead to London ceased on 5 March 1967, and on 4 November 1967 Birkenhead Woodside station was closed, the line being cut back to Rock Ferry for change to the Mersey Railway route.

From 1972 there were plans to extend the Merseyrail system, which was electrified in the central area, to Chester. Provision of funding and decision making took several years, but on 30 September 1985 electric operation took place from Rock Ferry to Hooton. This was extended to run between the Liverpool Loop and Chester on 4 October 1993.

== Services ==
Services are operated by Merseyrail as part of the Wirral Line network with trains running every 15 minutes between Birkenhead and Chester. Additionally trains run between Birkenhead and Hooton every 30 minutes and continue to Ellesmere Port on the Hooton–Helsby line.

== Station list ==
- Birkenhead Woodside; opened 31 March 1878; closed 5 November 1967;
- Birkenhead; original terminus at Grange Lane; opened 23 September 1840; closed 23 October 1844;
- Monks Ferry; on spur off original line; opened 23 October 1844; closed 31 March 1878;
- Birkenhead Town; opened 1 January 1889; closed 7 May 1945;
- Lime Kiln Lane; opened 30 May 1846; renamed Tranmere 1853; closed October 1857;
- Rock Ferry; opened 1 November 1862; still open; convergence of line from Mersey Tunnel;
- Rock Lane; opened 30 May 1846; closed 1 November 1862;
- Bebington; opened 23 September 1840; still open;
- Port Sunlight; opened 1 May 1914 for workmen; opened to public 9 May 1927; still open;
- Spital; opened September 1840; still open;
- Bromborough Rake; opened 30 September 1985; still open;
- Bromborough; opened June 1846; still open;
- Eastham Rake; opened 3 April 1995; still open;
- Hooton; opened October or November 1840; still open;
- Sutton; opened 23 September 1840; renamed Ledsham 1863; closed 20 July 1959;
- Capenhurst; opened 1 August 1879; still open;
- Mollington; opened late 1840; closed 7 March 1960;
- Upton-by-Chester; opened 17 July 1939; closed 9 January 1984;
- Bache; opened 9 January 1984; still open;
- Chester; original terminus of Chester and Birkenhead Railway; opened 23 September 1840; closed 1 August 1848;
- Chester; joint station; opened 1 August 1848; still open;
