= Birkenhead railway station =

Birkenhead railway station may refer to:

- Birkenhead Central railway station, the main station in Birkenhead, Wirral, England
- Birkenhead Dock railway station, a former station on the Hoylake Railway
- Birkenhead Grange Lane railway station, a former station on the Chester and Birkenhead Railway
- Birkenhead Hamilton Square railway station, an underground station on the Wirral Line of the Merseyrail network
- Birkenhead Monks Ferry railway station, a former station on the Chester and Birkenhead Railway
- Birkenhead North railway station, on the Wirral Line of the Merseyrail network
- Birkenhead Park railway station, on the Wirral Line of the Merseyrail network
- Birkenhead Town railway station, a former station on the Chester and Birkenhead Railway
- Birkenhead Woodside railway station, a former station on the Chester and Birkenhead Railway
- Peterhead railway station, Adelaide, serving Birkenhead, South Australia
