= Tattenhall Road railway station =

Former railway station in Cheshire, England

Coordinates: 53.1381°N 2.7574°W

Tattenhall Road
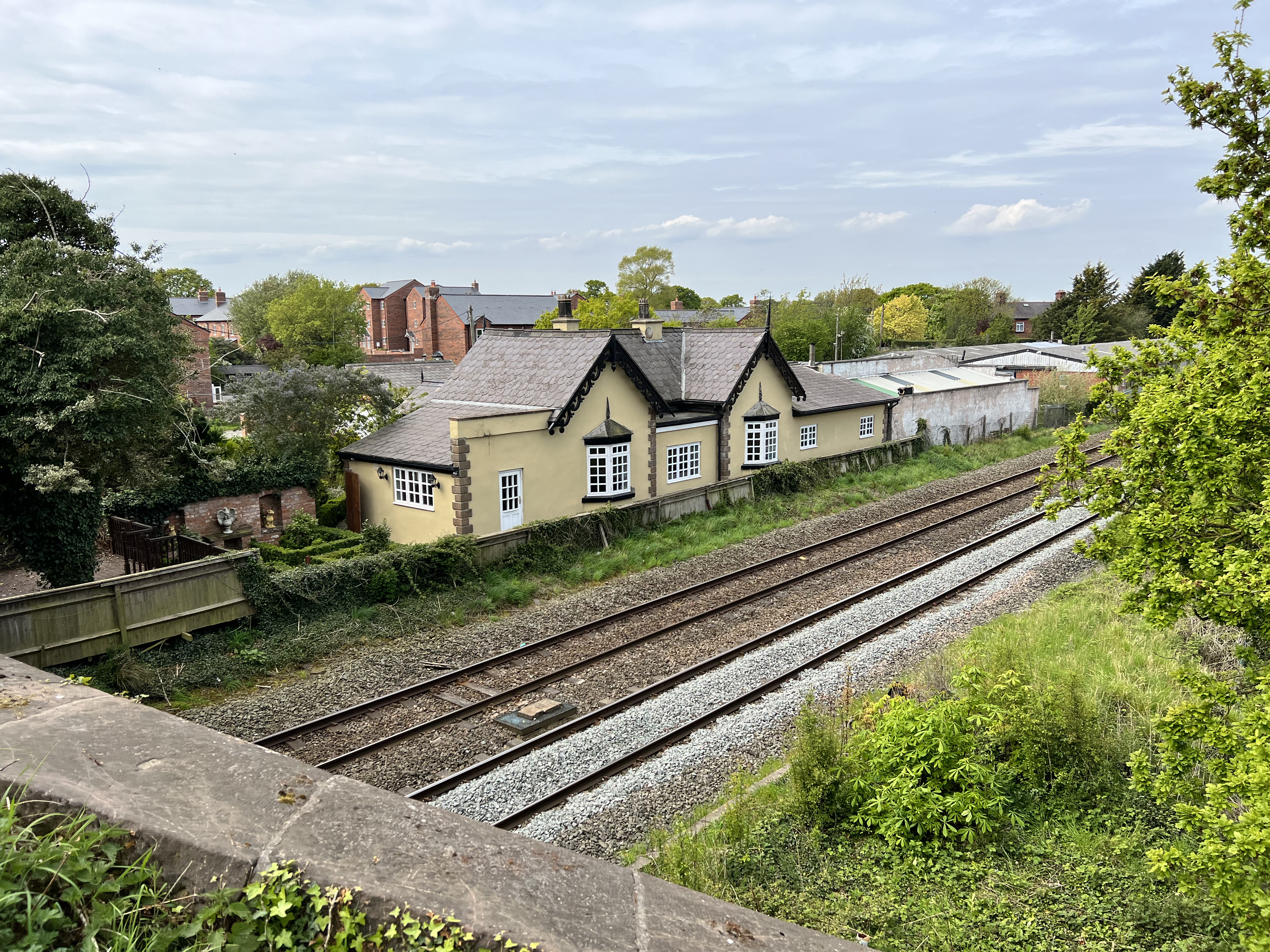

General information
- Location: Tattenhall, Cheshire West and Chester; England
- Grid reference: SJ494604
- Platforms: 2

Other information
- Status: Disused

History
- Original company: Grand Junction Railway
- Pre-grouping: London and North Western Railway
- Post-grouping: London, Midland and Scottish Railway

Key dates
- 1 October 1840: Opened as Tattenhall
- 1 August 1872: Renamed Tattenhall Road
- 1957: Renamed Tattenhall
- 18 April 1966: Closed
Location

Tattenhall Road railway station was a railway station situated a mile to the north of the village of Tattenhall, Cheshire on the Chester and Crewe Railway that was built in 1840 linking Chester to the north-west with Crewe to the south-east. The track now forms part of the North Wales Coast Line.

The station was named Tattenhall Road in 1872 to distinguish it from another Tattenhall railway station, a little to the west of the village, on the Whitchurch and Tattenhall Railway branch line to Whitchurch.

The station took back the name Tattenhall when the branch line closed in 1957. It was then itself closed in 1966. The station building still exists, now as a private house.

== Services ==
Preceding station	Historical railways	Following station
Beeston Castle and Tarporley; Line open, station closed	London and North Western Railway; North Wales Coast line	Black Dog; Line open, station closed
