= No Man's Heath, Cheshire =

Village in Cheshire, England

Coordinates: 53.0266°N 02.7238°W

No Man's Heath: Nomansheath
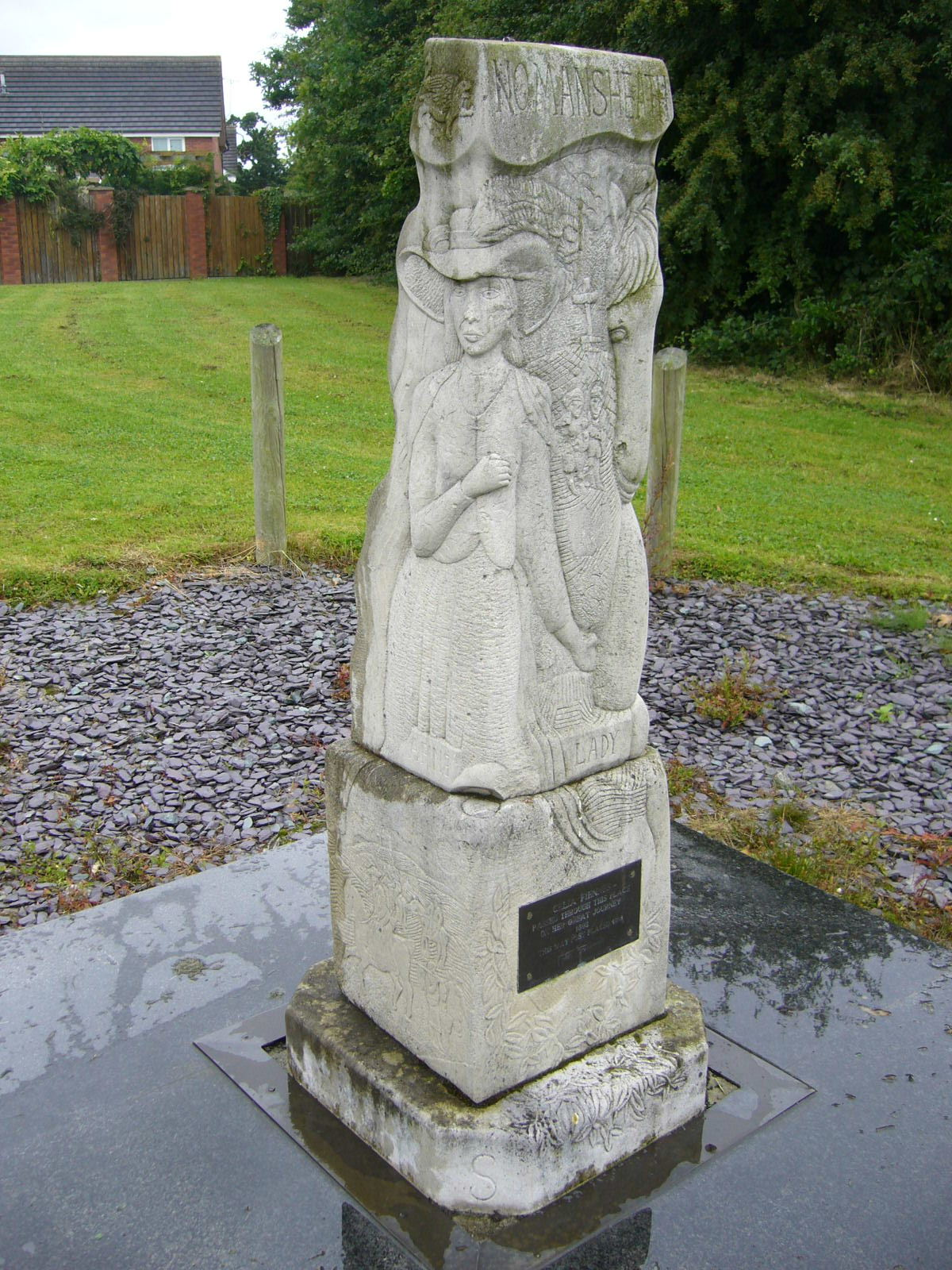
- The Celia Fiennes Waymark, sculpted by Jeff Eldridge, with an inscription on the base reading: "Celia Fiennes passed through this place on her great journey 1698 This way post placed 1998"

- Location within Cheshire
- OS grid reference: SJ515479
- Civil parish: No Man's Heath and District
- Unitary authority: Cheshire West and Chester
- Ceremonial county: Cheshire
- Region: North West
- Country: England
- Sovereign state: United Kingdom
- Post town: MALPAS
- Postcode district: SY14
- Dialling code: 01948
- Police: Cheshire
- Fire: Cheshire
- Ambulance: North West
- UK Parliament: Chester South and Eddisbury

No Man's Heath is a village in the unitary authority of Cheshire West and Chester and the ceremonial county of Cheshire, England. Its name has historically also been spelt Nomansheath and Noman's Heath, the latter being the version formerly favoured by the General Post Office.

It lies 2 miles (3.2 km) east of the village of Malpas and 5 miles (8 km) north-west of Whitchurch, Shropshire. Originally on the A41 road, there is now a bypass, which opened in July 2001. Bickleywood is a very small settlement about 1000 yards (1 km) to the east. The settlement of No Man's Heath was, historically, largely within the boundaries of Macefen civil parish until the 2015 boundary changes which created the civil parish of No Man's Heath and District.

There is no church in the village, due to the proximity of the church in Tushingham. However, there are The Wheatsheaf Inn, a disused non-conformist chapel and a small telephone exchange (which was called "Noman's Heath" in the days when exchanges had names) in close proximity to one another.

The southern section of the 30-mile Sandstone Trail footpath passes just east of the village, while the 200-mile Marches Way footpath passes just south. The Sustrans Regional Route 70 cycleway passes through the village, running out from Malpas.

Just over two miles east of the village is the 19th-century Cholmondeley Castle and gardens. Just to the north is the well-preserved Iron Age hillfort of Maiden Castle, spectacularly sited above the Dee valley.

The Whitchurch and Tattenhall Railway used to pass within a 1000 yards (a kilometre) of the village but the nearest station was Malpas railway station which was nearly three kilometres away and actually in Hampton Heath.

== Name origin and documented listings ==
The placename was first recorded as early as 1483 in the form "Nomonheth" and as "No Mans Heath" in 1671. In either case, the name refers to commonland outside specific ownership. The old parish of Malpas formerly had hundreds of acres of commonland, including some at No Man's Heath.

Kelly's Directory of Cheshire for 1896 does not list No Man's Heath and makes no mention under Hampton, which is listed under Malpas. Kelly's Directory for 1902 shows No Mans Heath merely as a sub-post office under Hampton. In their directory for 1914 the entry is very similar except for the addition of a telephone and an apostrophe on Man's.
