= Grindley Brook Halt railway station =

Former railway halt in the village of Grindley Brook, Shropshire, England

Grindley Brook

General information
- Location: Grindley Brook, Shropshire; England
- Coordinates: 52.9876°N 2.7143°W
- Grid reference: SJ521436
- Line: Whitchurch and Tattenhall Railway
- Platforms: 2

Other information
- Status: Disused

History
- Original company: London, Midland and Scottish Railway

Key dates
- 4 July 1938: Opened
- 16 September 1957: Closed
Location

Grindley Brook Halt was an unstaffed railway halt near the village of Grindley Brook, Shropshire on the Whitchurch and Tattenhall Railway or Chester-Whitchurch Branch Line.

== History ==
The halt opened on 4 July 1938 on the existing branch line between Whitchurch and Chester.

Grindley Brook village is mostly in Shropshire but the halt was located to the north of the village across the county boundary in Cheshire, now Cheshire West and Chester.

The halt was located where Wobbs Lane crossed the line on an overbridge with simple pedestrian pathways being linked to a nearby lane at the western end.

Yate (2014) speculates that it was believed to have consisted of a basic wooden construction, possibly redundant sleepers, and if any shelters were provided, they would also have been simple wooden affairs. The map shows no details other than the halt's existence.

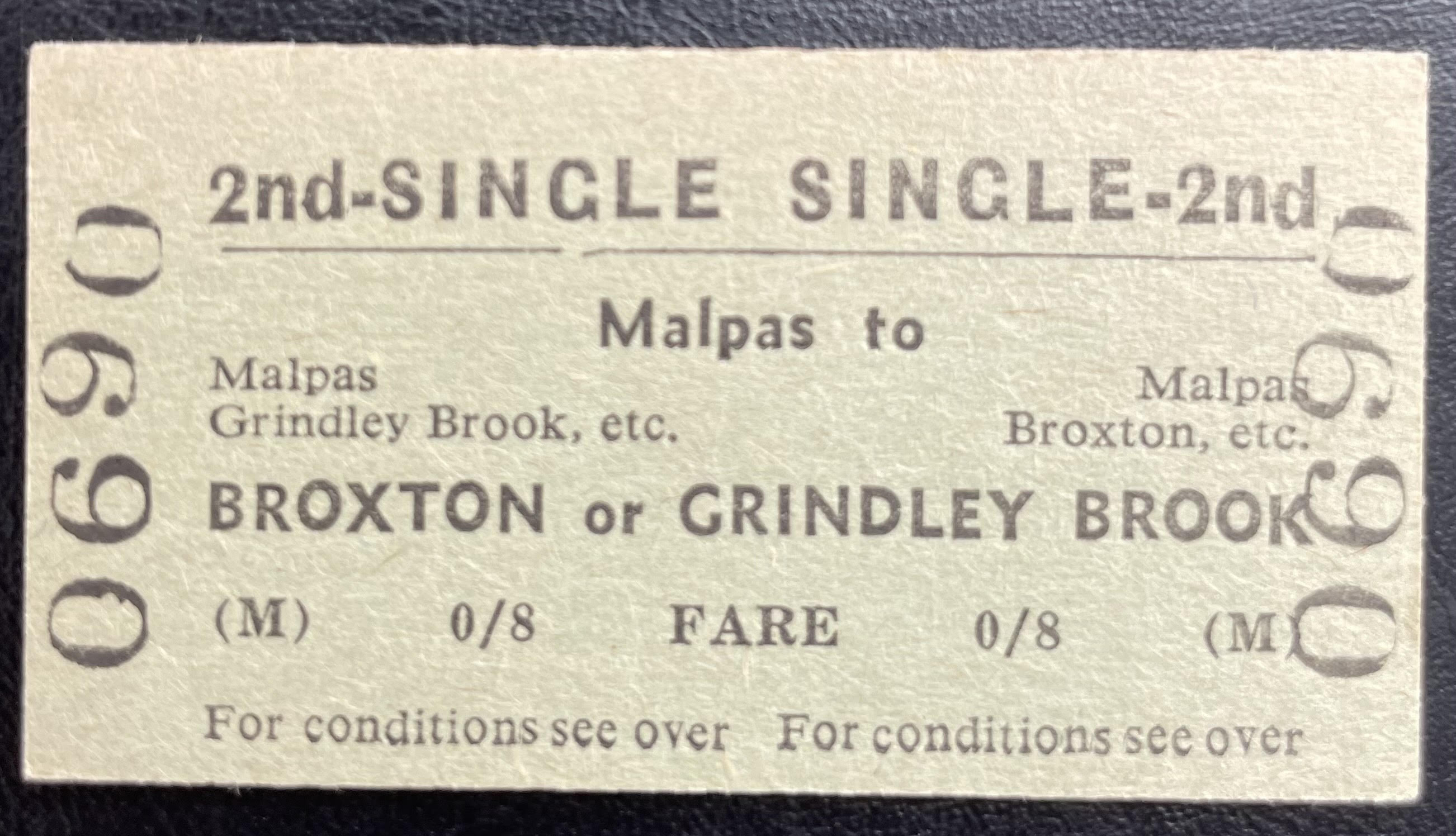
Second class single ticket from Malpas to Broxton or Grindley Brook, issued 12 September 1957.

The halt closed when the passenger service was withdrawn from the line on 16 September 1957.

== Services ==
Preceding station	Disused railways	Following station
Malpas; Line and station closed	London and North Western Railway; Whitchurch and Tattenhall Railway	Whitchurch; Line closed, station open

== Bibliography ==
- Quick, Michael (2023) [2001]. Railway passenger stations in Great Britain: a chronology (PDF). version 5.05. Railway & Canal Historical Society.
- Yate, Bob (2014). The Shrewsbury to Crewe Line. Nottingham: Book Law Publications. ISBN 978-1-909625-33-4.
