= Tattenhall railway station =

Former railway station in Cheshire, England

Tattenhall

General information
- Location: Tattenhall, Cheshire West and Chester; England
- Coordinates: 53.1211°N 2.7795°W
- Grid reference: SJ479585
- Line: Whitchurch and Tattenhall Railway
- Platforms: 2

Other information
- Status: Disused

History
- Original company: London and North Western Railway
- Pre-grouping: London and North Western Railway
- Post-grouping: London, Midland and Scottish Railway

Key dates
- 1 October 1872: Opened
- 16 September 1957: Closed
Location

Tattenhall railway station was a railway station that served the village of Tattenhall, Cheshire on the Whitchurch and Tattenhall Railway or Chester-Whitchurch Branch Line, about a mile to the south of Tattenhall junction where the branch line diverged from the North Wales Coast Line running from Chester in the north-west towards Crewe to the south-east.

== Opening ==
The station opened on 1 October 1872 when the London and North Western Railway (L&NWR) opened the branch line between Whitchurch and Chester.

== Description ==
It was located west of the village, where Frog Lane crossed the railway on an overbridge, the station was north of the road and east of the railway.

The station had two platforms, one each side of the running lines, the southbound platform had a two-storey stone building providing a booking office, waiting room and a house for the station master.

The other platform had a wooden shelter. This platform was only accessible via a barrow crossing at the end of the platforms.

There were no goods facilities at the station, goods were handled by Tattenhall Road that was on a different line, the Chester and Crewe Railway.

== Closure ==
The station closed to passengers on 16 September 1957.

The stationmaster’s house at Tattenhall has been converted into a private residence, although the waiting rooms and other ancillary buildings were demolished in 2005.

== Services ==
Preceding station	Disused railways	Following station
Black Dog; Line and station closed	London and North Western Railway; Whitchurch and Tattenhall Railway	Broxton; Line and station closed

== Bibliography ==
- Mitchell, Vic; Smith, Keith (2013). Shrewsbury to Crewe, including the Tattenhall route. Midland Main Lines. Midhurst, West Sussex: Middleton Press. ISBN 9781908174482. OCLC 1302240443.
- Quick, Michael (2023) [2001]. Railway passenger stations in Great Britain: a chronology (PDF). version 5.05. Railway & Canal Historical Society.
- The Railway Clearing House (1970) [1904]. The Railway Clearing House Handbook of Railway Stations 1904 (1970 D&C Reprint ed.). Newton Abbot: David & Charles Reprints. ISBN 0-7153-5120-6.
- Yate, Bob (2014). The Shrewsbury to Crewe Line. Nottingham: Book Law Publications. ISBN 978-1-909625-33-4.
