= Broxton railway station =

Former railway station in Cheshire, England

Broxton
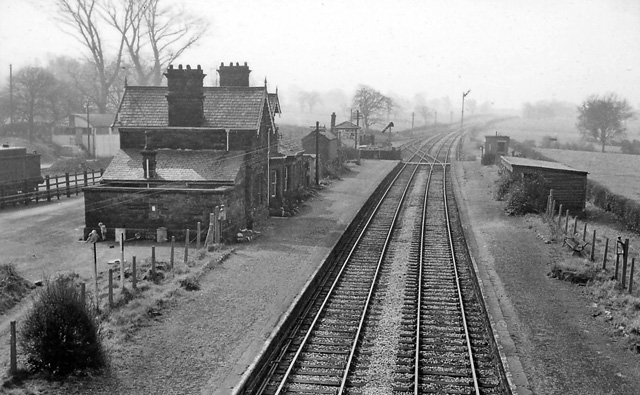
- The station buildings in 1962

General information
- Location: Broxton, Cheshire West and Chester; England
- Coordinates: 53.08385°N 2.77909°W
- Grid reference: SJ479543
- Line: Whitchurch and Tattenhall Railway
- Platforms: 2

Other information
- Status: Disused

History
- Original company: London and North Western Railway
- Pre-grouping: London and North Western Railway
- Post-grouping: London, Midland and Scottish Railway

Key dates
- 1 October 1872: Opened
- 16 September 1957: Closed to passengers
- 4 November 1963: Closed to goods traffic
Location

Broxton railway station was a railway station that served the village of Broxton, Cheshire on the Whitchurch and Tattenhall Railway or Chester–Whitchurch Branch Line.

== Opening ==
The station opened on 1 October 1872 when the London and North Western Railway (L&NWR) opened the branch line between Whitchurch and Chester.

== Description ==
It was located west of the crossroads in Broxton, effectively behind the Edgerton Arms Hotel, where Broxton Road crossed the railway on an overbridge, access was to the eastern side of the station from Broxton Road (now the A534).

The station had two platforms, one each side of the running lines, the southbound platform had a two-storey stone building providing a booking office, waiting room and a house for the station master, a parcels shed was adjacent to the main building as well as a shed on staddle stones.

The other platform had a wooden shelter. This platform was only accessible via a barrow crossing at the end of the platforms.

There was a small goods yard with three sidings behind the main station building on the eastern side of the lines, access to it was from the south and was controlled by a small signal box. The goods yard was able to accommodate most types of goods including live stock and was equipped with a five ton crane.

One siding led into a cattle dock with an end-on loading platform. A second siding ran into the centre of the yard where coal stages were provided and a third siding reached the eastern perimeter of the yard where there was a sizeable cheese warehouse, the property of Messrs. Bamber & Son.

Special trains often became necessary for the transport of the large quantities of cheese produced, one such special occurred in 1907 when a grocer by the name of Edward Driver, with a chain of stores in West Yorkshire, purchased 50 tons of the local cheese and hired a special train for its conveyance. This train was highly decorated so as to gain the most possible publicity, bearing the title “Driver's Christmas Cheese Train”, utilising around 20 ventilated fruit vans for the purpose. The exercise was repeated in the following year, but does not seem to have been perpetuated thereafter.

== Closure ==
The station closed to passengers on 16 September 1957 and to goods on 4 November 1963.

After closure the entire station and goods yard were demolished and converted into Broxton Picnic Area. The humped-back overbridge has been demolished and the road improved.

== Services ==
| Preceding station | Disused railways | Following station |
|---|---|---|
| Tattenhall; Line and station closed | London and North Western Railway; Whitchurch and Tattenhall Railway | Malpas; Line and station closed |

== Bibliography ==
- Christiansen, Rex (1988). Forgotten Railways:Severn Valley and Welsh Border. David & Charles. ISBN 0-946537-43-7.
- Clinker, C. R. (October 1978). Clinker's Register of Closed Passenger Stations and Goods Depots in England, Scotland and Wales 1830–1977. Bristol: Avon-Anglia Publications & Services. ISBN 0-905466-19-5. OCLC 5726624.
- Mitchell, Vic; Smith, Keith (2013). Shrewsbury to Crewe, including the Tattenhall route. Midland Main Lines. Midhurst, West Sussex: Middleton Press. ISBN 9781908174482. OCLC 1302240443.
- Quick, Michael (2023) [2001]. Railway passenger stations in Great Britain: a chronology (PDF). version 5.05. Railway & Canal Historical Society.
- The Railway Clearing House (1970) [1904]. The Railway Clearing House Handbook of Railway Stations 1904 (1970 D&C Reprint ed.). Newton Abbot: David & Charles Reprints. ISBN 0-7153-5120-6.
- Yate, Bob (2014). The Shrewsbury to Crewe Line. Nottingham: Book Law Publications. ISBN 978-1-909625-33-4.
