= No Man's Heath =

No Man's Heath may be one of two places in England:

- No Man's Heath, Cheshire
- No Man's Heath, Warwickshire, a village very close to the borders of Leicestershire, Staffordshire, and Derbyshire
