= Waverton railway station =

Waverton railway station may refer to:

- Waverton railway station (Cheshire)
- Waverton railway station, Sydney
