= Birkenhead Town railway station =

Former railway station in Birkenhead, Wirral, England

Birkenhead Town
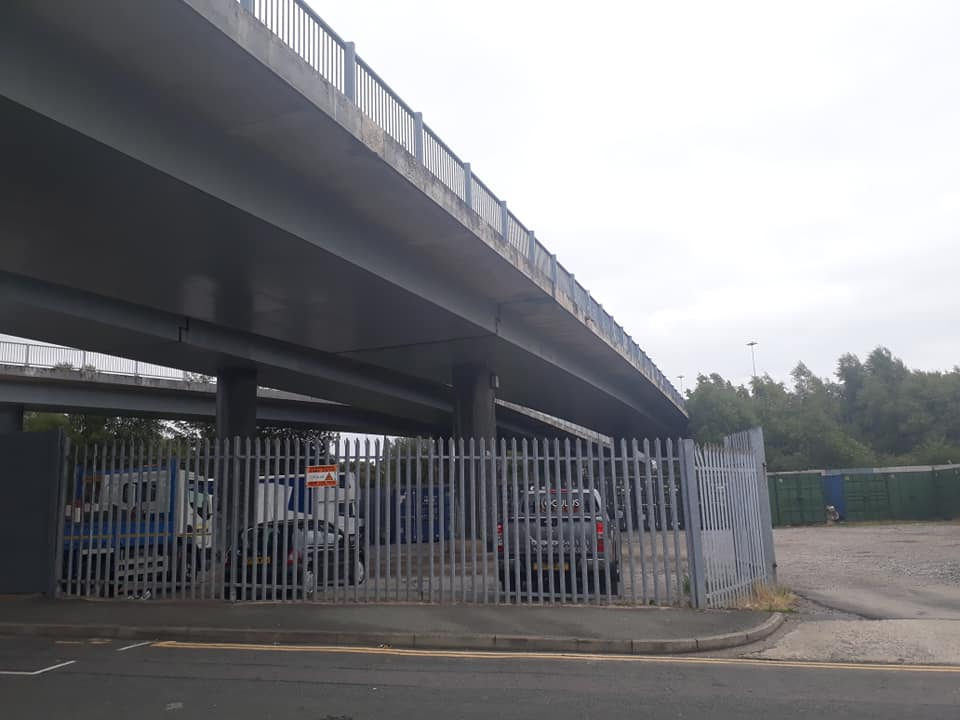

General information
- Location: Birkenhead, Wirral; England
- Coordinates: 53.3895°N 3.0164°W
- Platforms: 2

Other information
- Status: Disused

History
- Opened: 1 January 1889
- Closed: 7 May 1945
- Original company: Chester and Birkenhead Railway
- Pre-grouping: GWR & LNWR Joint
Location

Birkenhead Town railway station is a disused railway station in Birkenhead, Wirral, England. It was located near the current entrance to the Queensway Tunnel on Grange Road.

== History ==
=== Background ===
The site, on which the station was built, was to the east of Birkenhead's original railway terminus at Grange Lane, which closed in 1844. To the north lay two tunnel entrances; the first, completed in 1844, led to the town's second terminus at Monks Ferry. To the left of this portal lay the tunnel to the new passenger terminus of Birkenhead Woodside, built in 1878. Subsequently, the Monks Ferry branch was used exclusively for freight.

=== Opening ===
Birkenhead Town station was opened on 1 January 1889 by the Joint Committee of the Chester and Birkenhead Railway, administered by the Great Western Railway(GWR) and the London and North Western Railway (LNWR). It was built to accommodate the nearby commercial centre of Birkenhead.

=== Services ===
The line which travelled through the station bore trains from Birkenhead Woodside to London Paddington, but only local trains from Woodside to Chester, West Kirby, Helsby and North Wales served the station.

A freight depot, handling minerals, had been established by the LNWR at the former locomotive shed on the site of the original Grange Lane terminus. Known as the Birkenhead Town Goods Depot, this facility was surplus to requirements by the middle of the 20th century and was closed on 29 May 1961.

=== Demise ===
In 1934, the Queensway road tunnel to Liverpool was opened. This had been established opposite the entrance to the station, after the demolition of much property in the vicinity. This development also resulted in the station becoming cut off from reasonable access to the town's market area and the residential district near Birkenhead Priory.

Birkenhead Town station closed on 7 May 1945, although the line continued in use until 1967 when Birkenhead Woodside closed. As of 2007, the tunnels (now partially infilled) and site of the station still exist. However, the area is now enclosed between the approach roads to the Queensway road tunnel entrance, which were redesigned and extended in the 1960s. From 2022, the site will become part of a new park, which is currently being constructed. Known as Dock Branch Park, it will link Rock Ferry with Bidston Dock, providing a route for pedestrians and cyclists.

| Preceding station | Historical railways | Following station |
|---|---|---|
| Tranmere; Line and station closed | GWR & LNWR; Chester & Birkenhead Railway | Birkenhead Monks Ferry; Line and station closed |
| Tranmere; Line and station closed | GWR & LNWR; Chester & Birkenhead Railway | Birkenhead Woodside; Line and station closed |
