= Birkenhead Woodside railway station =

Former GWR & LNWR railway station in Birkenhead, Wirral, England

Coordinates: 53.39535°N 3.01054°W

Birkenhead Woodside
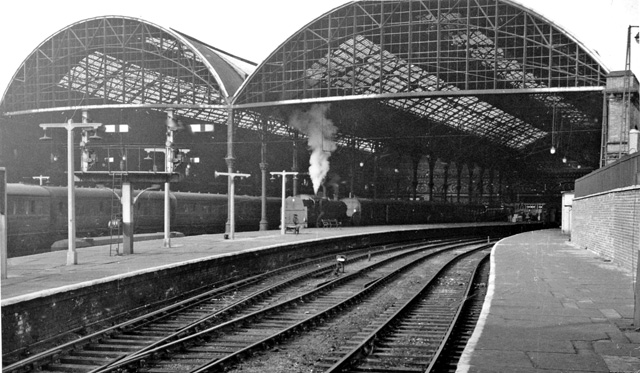
- Birkenhead Woodside railway station in 1961

General information
- Location: Birkenhead, Wirral; England
- Grid reference: SJ328892
- Platforms: Five

Other information
- Status: Disused

History
- Opened: 31 March 1878
- Closed: 5 November 1967
- Original company: Chester and Birkenhead Railway
- Pre-grouping: GWR & LNWR Joint
Location

Birkenhead Woodside was a railway station located at Woodside, in Birkenhead, on the Wirral Peninsula, Cheshire. It served both local services within Cheshire and long-distance services to southern England, including London.

== Background ==
Birkenhead Woodside railway station was opened on 31 March 1878, to replace the increasingly inadequate passenger facilities provided at Birkenhead Monks Ferry station. The terminus was constructed further inland than originally planned to avoid the demolition of the Mersey ferries workshop situated on the riverbank. The station was built on an east–west axis, with the lines servicing the station coming from the south. Access to the station was via a half-mile tunnel from the south, curving eastward into the station. This design was consistent with Liverpool termini, with the exception of Liverpool Exchange, which lacked tunnel access.

To connect with the existing track of the Chester and Birkenhead Railway, a half mile-long tunnel from Woodside to alongside the existing Monks Ferry tunnel entrance, near Grange Lane, was constructed using the cut-and-cover method, with most of its length running under Chester Street.

The station was characterized by its cramped layout, with Platform 1 measuring 537 ft (164 m) in length. Longer coaching stock was not permitted to be stabled on the curved part of No.3 siding.

== Building ==
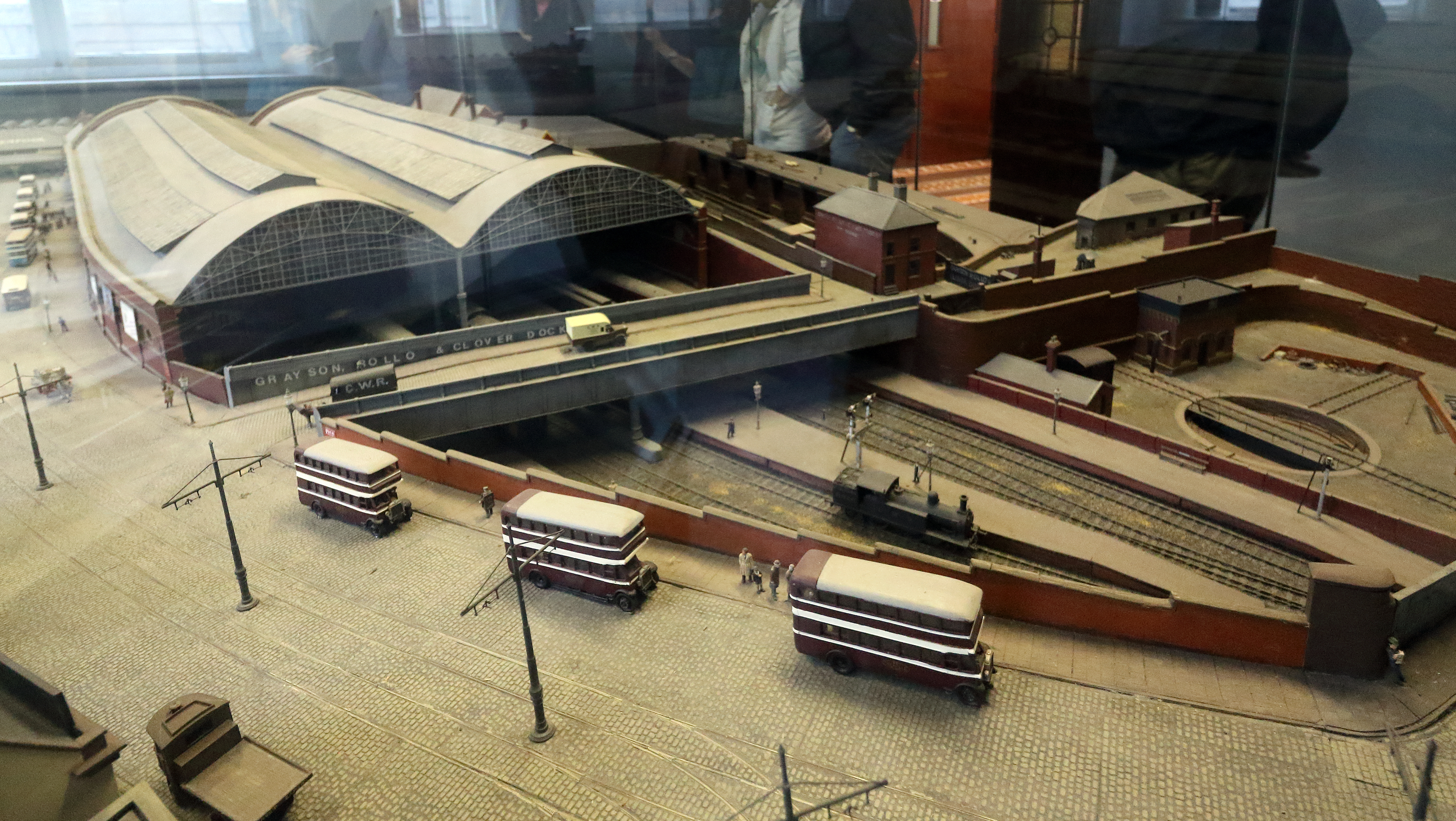
Model of the rear view of the station as it was in 1934 showing incoming lines.

The station was a grandiose building, with two semi cylindrical roofs covering much of the platforms. However, the size of the station made it have only five short (but wide) platforms, as much of the space was taken up by middle tracks and a roadway.

The station building was known to local rail users as "the wrong way round"; for the majority of the station's life, its original rear entrance was used as the main booking hall, and Woodside's 'front' entrance was mainly for handling parcels. The latter entrance, covered in a porte-cochere to allow travelling gentry to avoid inclement weather, faced the graving dock on the south side of the station. It had been intended that passengers disembarking from the nearby ferry terminal of the same name would use this entrance. Unfortunately, the ferry companies were slow at co-operating and when the tram terminus opened in front of the ferry terminal in the early 1900s, the decision was made to keep the small 'back' entrance a permanent fixture. That was very unfortunate, as passengers arriving at the station never got to see the huge sandstone fireplaces, decorative brick work and massive timber roof trusses holding up the roof of the intended booking hall, which has been described by Marcus Binney of Save Britain's Heritage as "a station of truly baronial proportions and being worthy of any London terminus".

== Services ==
Birkenhead Woodside served as the terminus for local services to Chester, Helsby, West Kirby, and destinations in north Wales via Ruabon. Additionally, it offered routes to Great Western Railway (GWR) services to Chester General, Wrexham General, Ruabon, Shrewsbury, Wolverhampton Low Level, Birmingham Snow Hill, and London Paddington. Daily, through trains to the Kent coast via Oxford, Reading and Redhill were also available, jointly operated with the Southern Railway. Southern Railway's green-liveried stock could be seen at Woodside on alternate days. Moreover, summer services to Bournemouth were provided.

== Closure ==
The Beeching Report, in 1963, recommended the closure of three of Merseyside's mainline terminal stations: Liverpool Exchange, Liverpool Central High Level and Birkenhead Woodside. It also recommend the closure of the Liverpool Exchange to Southport electric commuter route and of all routes in to Central High Level station. However, the electric lines from Liverpool to the Wirral were recommended for retention. Long- and medium- distance routes served by the three termini were to be concentrated on Lime Street station.

Liverpool City Council viewed matters differently from Beeching by proposing the retention of the suburban services around the city and their integration into a regional Merseyside-wide rapid-transit network. That approach was supported by the Merseyside Area Land Use and Transportation Study, the MALTS report. Liverpool City Council's proposal was adopted and Merseyrail was born.

- Lime Street station, in Liverpool city centre was to remain, absorbing the long- and medium-distance passenger traffic of the closed terminal stations.
- The local urban services served by the terminal stations would be absorbed by the new Merseyrail urban network.

By early 1967, there were still six through trains on weekdays between Birkenhead Woodside and London Paddington. In March of that year, the route was effectively curtailed at Wolverhampton, as a result of the introduction of electric trains on the West Coast Main Line. At the same time, the last steam service from the station took place, in the withdrawal of through services to Birmingham.

Only the diesel train service to Chester and trains to Helsby remained to use the station. The station closed to passengers on 5 November 1967 and despite being the only listed terminus in Merseyside, was demolished within a year. The Chester and Helsby route was cut back to Rock Ferry after the station's closure. In 1993, the Chester line was electrified and incorporated into Merseyrail; the branch from Hooton to Helsby was electrified as far as Ellesmere Port a year later and also incorporated into Merseyrail.

Today, the only evidence of Woodside's existence is a part of the station wall, a road bridge and the tunnel, which lay at the station throat. The gates of the station were reused at a house in Gayton. The rest of the land is now used as a bus park and the Woodside Business Park. The half-mile tunnel access to the site is not impeded and so there is provision for future modes of transport.

== Association with Wilfred Owen ==
Thomas (known as Tom) Owen, the father of First World War poet Wilfred Owen, was station master at Woodside from 1898 until returning to Shropshire (from where he had moved to Birkenhead) to take up a senior post at Shrewsbury railway station in 1907. During that period the family lived at three successive homes in the Tranmere area of the town and Wilfred attended the Birkenhead Institute High School (since demolished) for his education.

== See also ==
- Birkenhead Central railway station
- Birkenhead Grange Lane railway station
- Birkenhead Monks Ferry railway station
- Birkenhead North railway station
- Birkenhead Park railway station
- Birkenhead Town railway station
- Hamilton Square railway station
- Chester and Birkenhead Railway
- Wirral Railway

Preceding station	Historical railways	Following station
Birkenhead Town; Line and station closed	GWR & LNWR; Chester & Birkenhead Railway	Terminus
