= Listed buildings in Hampton, Cheshire =

Hampton is a former civil parish, now in the parishes of No Man's Heath and District and Malpas, in Cheshire West and Chester, England. It contains four buildings that are recorded in the National Heritage List for England as designated listed buildings. One of these is listed at Grade II*, the middle grade, and the other three at the lowest grade, Grade II. The parish is entirely rural, and all the listed buildings are domestic, or related to farming.

== Key ==
| Grade | Criteria |
|---|---|
| II* | Particularly important buildings of more than special interest |
| II | Buildings of national importance and special interest |

== Buildings ==
| Name and location | Photograph | Date | Notes | Grade |
|---|---|---|---|---|
| Hampton Old Hall; 53.0373°N 2.7346°W | — | 1591 | The country house has been subsequently altered and extended. The main block is timber-framed on a stone plinth, with wings in stone and diapered brick. The roofs are partly slated and partly tiled. The building is in two storeys with cellars, and the front of the main block is in three bays, each with a gable surmounted by a finial. On the right side is a timber-framed porch. The windows are mullioned and transomed, containing casements. | II* |
| Ashton Cross Farmhouse; 53.0422°N 2.7451°W | — | Early 17th century | Alterations were made later to the farmhouse, particularly in the 19th century. It is timber-framed, partly on a stone plinth; it is partly brick nogged, and partly limewashed. On the left side and rear are brick wings. The roofs are tiled. The farmhouse has two storeys, and is in three bays. In the central bay is a dormer, and to the right of it is a timber-framed porch. The windows are casements. | II |
| Barn, Hampton Old Hall; 53.0375°N 2.7353°W | — | 17th century | The barn is timber-framed with brick nogging, and is roofed with corrugated iron. It consists of a shippon with a hayloft above. On the gables are stone parapets and a weathercock. | II |
| Hampton Post; 53.0423°N 2.7363°W | — | c. 1665 or earlier | The house has been much altered. It is in sandstone and brick, the upper floors being partly pebbledashed. The roofs are slated. It has two storeys, partly with a cellar, and is in three bays with a 1½-storey bay on the left. The windows are casements. Inside the house is an inglenook. | II |

== See also ==
- Listed buildings in Bickerton
- Listed buildings in Bickley
- Listed buildings in Bradley
- Listed buildings in Cholmondeley
- Listed buildings in Duckington
- Listed buildings in Egerton
- Listed buildings in Malpas
- Listed buildings in Norbury
- Listed buildings in Tilston
- Listed buildings in Tushingham cum Grindley
