= Chester General rail crash =

1972 disaster in Chester, England

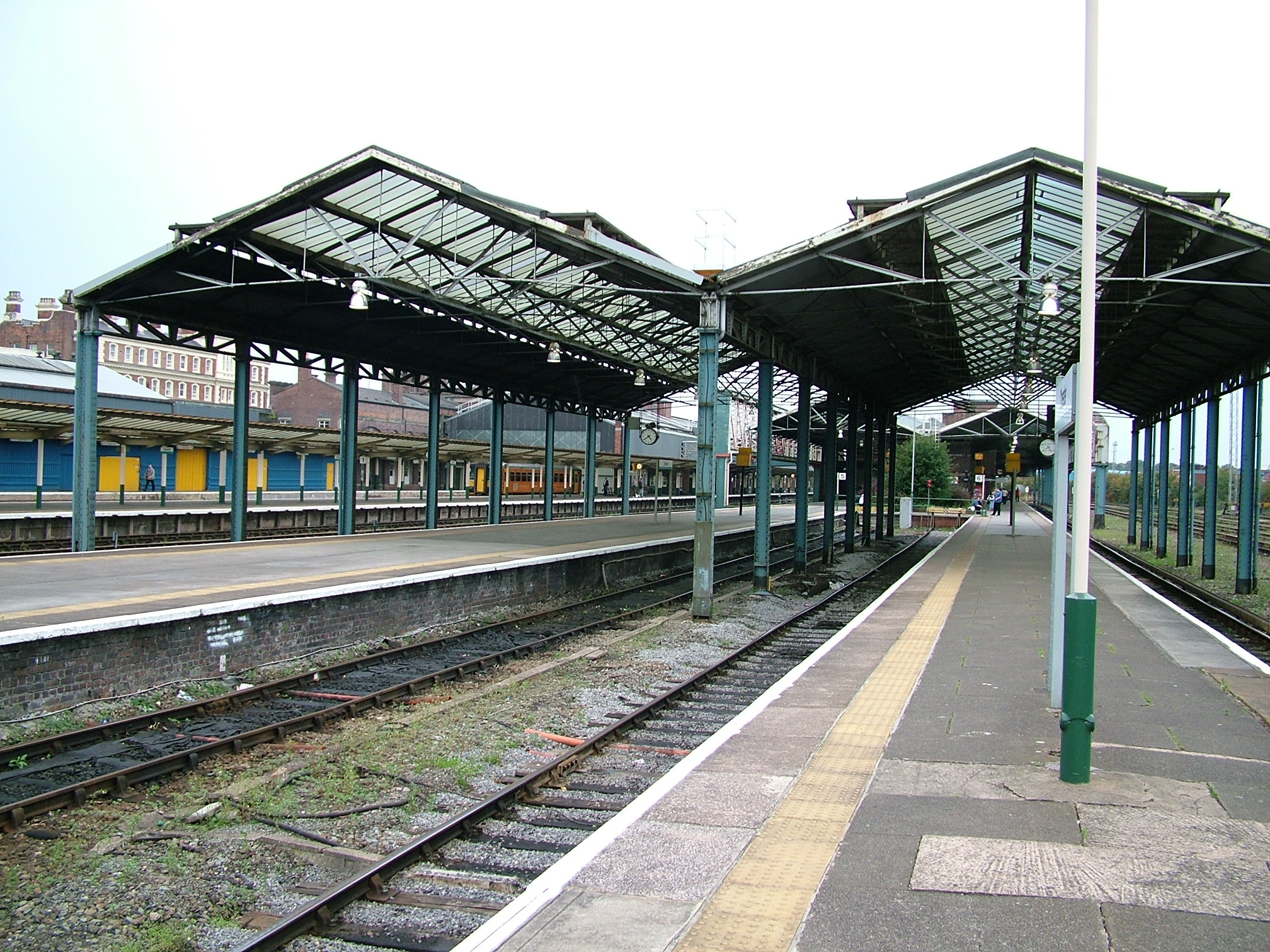
- Chester Station seen in 2005, showing the section of roof that was not replaced

Details
- Date: 8 May 1972; 20:50
- Location: Chester railway station, Chester, England.
- Coordinates: 53°11′47″N 2°52′41.7″W
- Country: United Kingdom
- Line: Chester to Manchester Line
- Incident type: Collision, derailment, fire
- Cause: Failure to connect vacuum brake pipes to the locomotive

Statistics
- Trains: 2
- Deaths: 0

The Chester General rail crash occurred on 8 May 1972 at Chester, northwest England, resulting in extensive fire damage, but no casualties. It was caused by a failure to connect the freight train's brakes correctly due to human error.

== Course of events ==
The 19:31 freight train from Ellesmere Port to Mold Junction consisted of 38 wagons hauled by a Class 24 diesel locomotive no. 5028. The first five wagons were tank wagons containing kerosene, petrol and gas oil.

At around 20:50 the train was approaching Chester railway station (then known as Chester General) on a 1 in 100 falling gradient when the driver discovered that he did not have sufficient braking power to stop the train. It ran past a signal at danger and through a set of points which were set for no. 11 bay platform, where an empty diesel multiple unit was standing.

As there was nothing more he could do, the driver jumped out onto the platform with the train still travelling at around 20 mph. It ploughed straight into the DMU and completely destroyed the first coach. The second coach was torn from its bogies and thrown up onto the platform where it demolished the refreshment room wall. There were very few people on that part of the station, although the staff in the refreshment room had to shelter themselves from falling masonry.

A major fire broke out when the burst fuel tanks of the trains ignited, but Chester's fire station was nearby so firecrews arrived within a couple of minutes. They rescued a trapped postal worker and evacuated several passengers from an adjacent lightly loaded train before it was engulfed in flames.

Damage caused to the trains was severe, especially after petrol from two of the tank wagons began to boil and was forced out of the pressure relief valves, whereupon it ignited. The fire was not extinguished until 00:20 the following day.

All the trains involved were written off and a section of the station roof was damaged and consequently removed.

== Causes ==
An inquiry found that human error was the contributing factor to the crash. On partially-fitted freight trains the first few wagons had their vacuum brake lines connected to the locomotive. This meant that when the engine braked these wagons also applied their brakes helping to stop the train. In the case of this crash, the train had run as an unbraked freight train from Helsby into Chester. This was because after leaving Ellesmere Port, the train had to stop at Helsby to reverse. The guard had forgotten to reconnect the vacuum pipe between locomotive and train when the locomotive coupled up to the opposite end of the train. As the extra brake power was not available on the falling gradient into Chester, the train was unable to stop as it entered the station. The driver had also omitted to carry out a brake test before departure from Helsby.

== See also ==
- Lists of rail accidents
- List of British rail accidents
