= Waverton railway station (Cheshire) =

Former railway station in Cheshire, England

Waverton
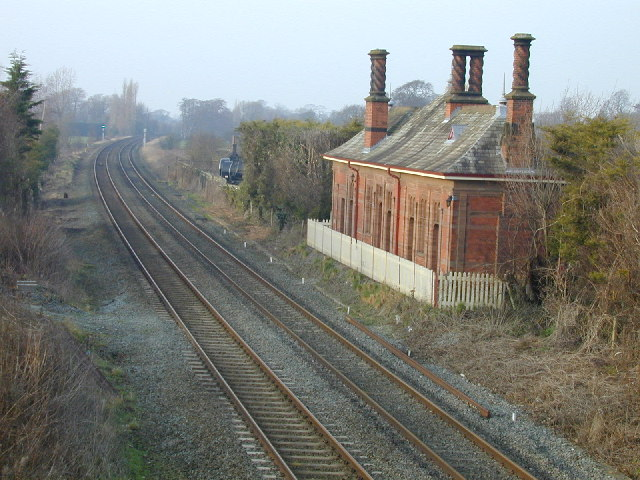

General information
- Location: Waverton, Cheshire West and Chester; England
- Coordinates: 53.1662°N 2.8250°W
- Grid reference: SJ448636
- Platforms: Two

Other information
- Status: Disused

History
- Original company: Grand Junction Railway
- Pre-grouping: London and North Western Railway
- Post-grouping: London, Midland and Scottish Railway

Key dates
- 6 June 1898: opened and replaced first station
- 15 June 1959: closed
Location

Waverton is a former railway station that served the village of Waverton in Cheshire West and Chester, England. From 1898 to 1959, it replaced the first station which was open between 1840 and 1898.

== History ==
This station, which opened on the day the first station closed, had two side platforms with matching buildings and canopies. It also had goods sidings. Passengers services ceased in 1959 and the station closed completely six years later.

== Present day ==
Today, only part of the eastbound station building remains. The building on the former Chester-bound platform has been demolished. In 2018, Stagecoach Merseyside & South Lancashire opened a bus depot on the former station site.

== Services ==
Preceding station	Historical railways	Following station
Black Dog; Line open, station closed	London and North Western Railway; North Wales Coast line	Chester General; Line open, station closed
	Disused railways	
Black Dog; Line and station closed	London and North Western Railway; Whitchurch and Tattenhall Railway	Chester General; Line and station open

== See also ==
- Listed buildings in Waverton, Cheshire
