= Black Dog railway station =

Former railway station in Cheshire, England

Black Dog
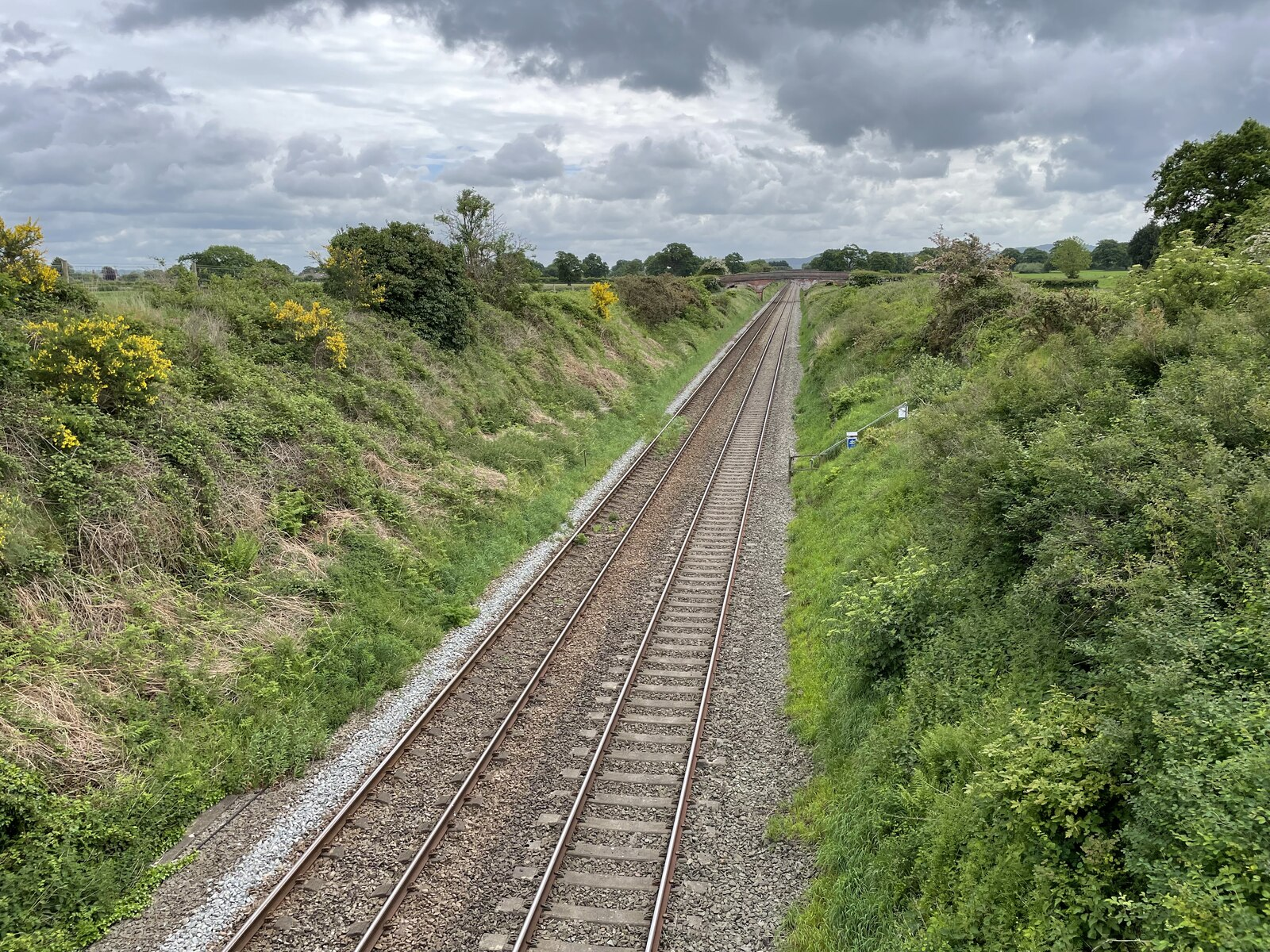

General information
- Location: Waverton, Cheshire West and Chester; England
- Coordinates: 53.1625°N 2.8164°W
- Platforms: 2

Other information
- Status: Disused

History
- Original company: Grand Junction Railway
- Pre-grouping: London and North Western Railway

Key dates
- 1 October 1840: opened
- 6 June 1898: Station closed and resited
Location

Black Dog railway station was the first station that served the village of Waverton in Cheshire West and Chester, England. The stop, which was open from 1840 to 1898, was known as "Black Dog" after a nearby public house, but it was sometimes referred to as "Waverton". The station was closed in 1898 after it was replaced with the second station at Waverton, which was about 120 m (390 ft) west of Black Dog; it closed to passengers in 1959.

== History ==
The station opened in October 1840, on the Crewe to Chester line built by the Grand Junction Railway. It was initially called "Black Dog", after the nearby pub before its name was changed to Waverton two years later. The station had a building and two side platforms.

It was situated next to the bridge (53°9′45.41″N 2°49′0.20″W) that carried the London to Birkenhead coach road (today A41). The station closed in 1898 after Hugh Grosvenor, 1st Duke of Westminster had the new Waverton Station built 0.43 miles (690 m) west of this station.

== Accidents ==
A collision on the line was reported on 2 September 1865 when an excursion train ran into a goods train that was shunting wagons. The locomotive was derailed and part of the track 'torn up'. From the description it seems that the shunting of goods trains at the siding at almost all stations of the time was timed to occur during gaps in the regular service. It was said that the greater proportion of accidents happened to excursion trains, and that there was deemed to be a "railway accident season" which coincided with the season for excursions.

On 29 September 1882 there was another accident at or near to Waverton when the midnight Irish Mail Train collided with a Wigan goods train that had overshot its mark at the points and was slightly across the main line. While no one was killed many were injured and were taken to Crewe where they were tended to by the company's surgeon at the Crewe Arms Hotel.

== Present day ==
Today, the site of the station is occupied by the Chester-Crewe Line and was up until closure also on the Whitchurch and Tattenhall Railway to Whitchurch before it was resited.

== Services ==
Preceding station	Historical railways	Following station
Tattenhall Road; Line open, station closed	London and North Western Railway; North Wales Coast line	Waverton; Line open, station closed
	Disused railways	
Tattenhall; Line and station closed	London and North Western Railway; Whitchurch and Tattenhall Railway	Waverton; Line open, station closed
