= Malpas railway station =

Former railway station in Cheshire, England

Malpas
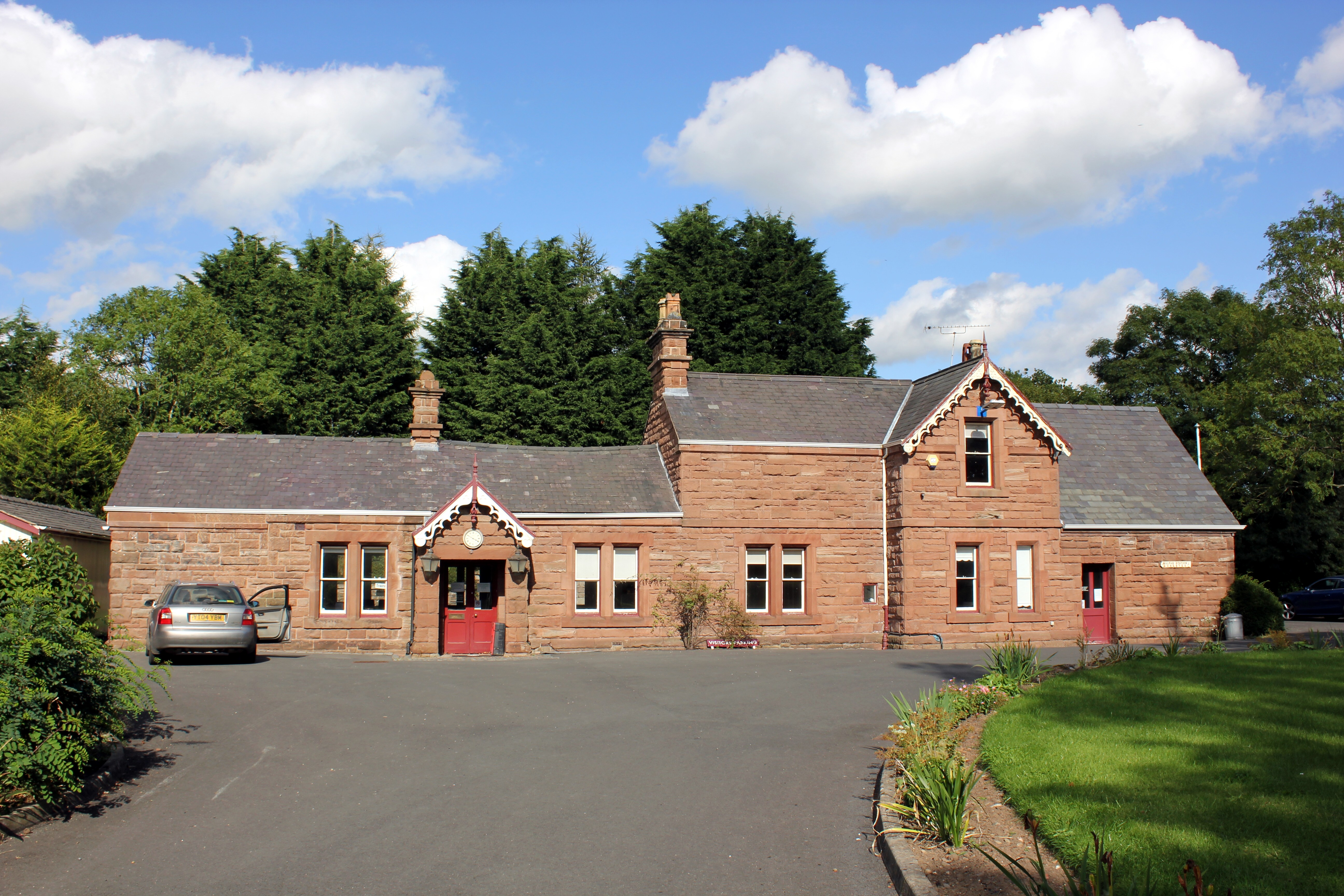
- Station building in use as offices (2013)

General information
- Location: Hampton Heath, Cheshire West and Chester; England
- Coordinates: 53.0379°N 2.7506°W
- Grid reference: SJ498491
- Line: Whitchurch and Tattenhall Railway
- Platforms: 2

Other information
- Status: Disused

History
- Original company: London and North Western Railway
- Pre-grouping: London and North Western Railway
- Post-grouping: London, Midland and Scottish Railway

Key dates
- 1 October 1872: Opened
- 16 September 1957: Closed to passengers
- 4 November 1963: Closed to goods traffic
Location

Malpas railway station was a railway station that served the market town of Malpas, Cheshire, on the Whitchurch and Tattenhall Railway or Chester–Whitchurch Branch Line. The station itself was at Hampton Heath and was also known locally as Hampton Station.

== Opening ==
The station opened on 1 October 1872 when the London and North Western Railway (L&NWR) opened the branch line between Whitchurch and Chester.

== Description ==
It was located just south of Hampton Heath centre, where the road to Malpas (now the B5069, Chester Road) crossed the railway. Malpas village was 1.4 mi (2.3 km) away from the station.

The station had two platforms, one each side of the running lines, the northbound platform had a two-storey stone building providing a booking office, waiting room and a house for the station master, a parcels shed was adjacent to the main building and a canopy was provided covering part of the platform.

The other platform had a wooden shelter. This platform was accessible via a path down from the road overbridge, access between the platforms was via a barrow crossing at the end of the platforms.

There was a goods yard and shed to the north of the station on the western side of the lines, access to it was controlled by a small signal box. The goods yard was able to accommodate most types of goods including live stock and was equipped with a ten-ton crane.

== Unusual visitors ==
On the eve of an official visit to Chester in May 1917 during the First World War, the Royal Train carrying George V and Queen Mary stopped for the night at Malpas station. Troops from the Household Division guarded the area throughout the stay.

In 1944, wounded German POWs captured in Normandy during Operation Overlord were brought to Malpas before being transferred to the US Army hospital established just across the border in Penley, Wales.

== Closure ==
The station closed to passengers on 16 September 1957 and to goods on 4 November 1963.

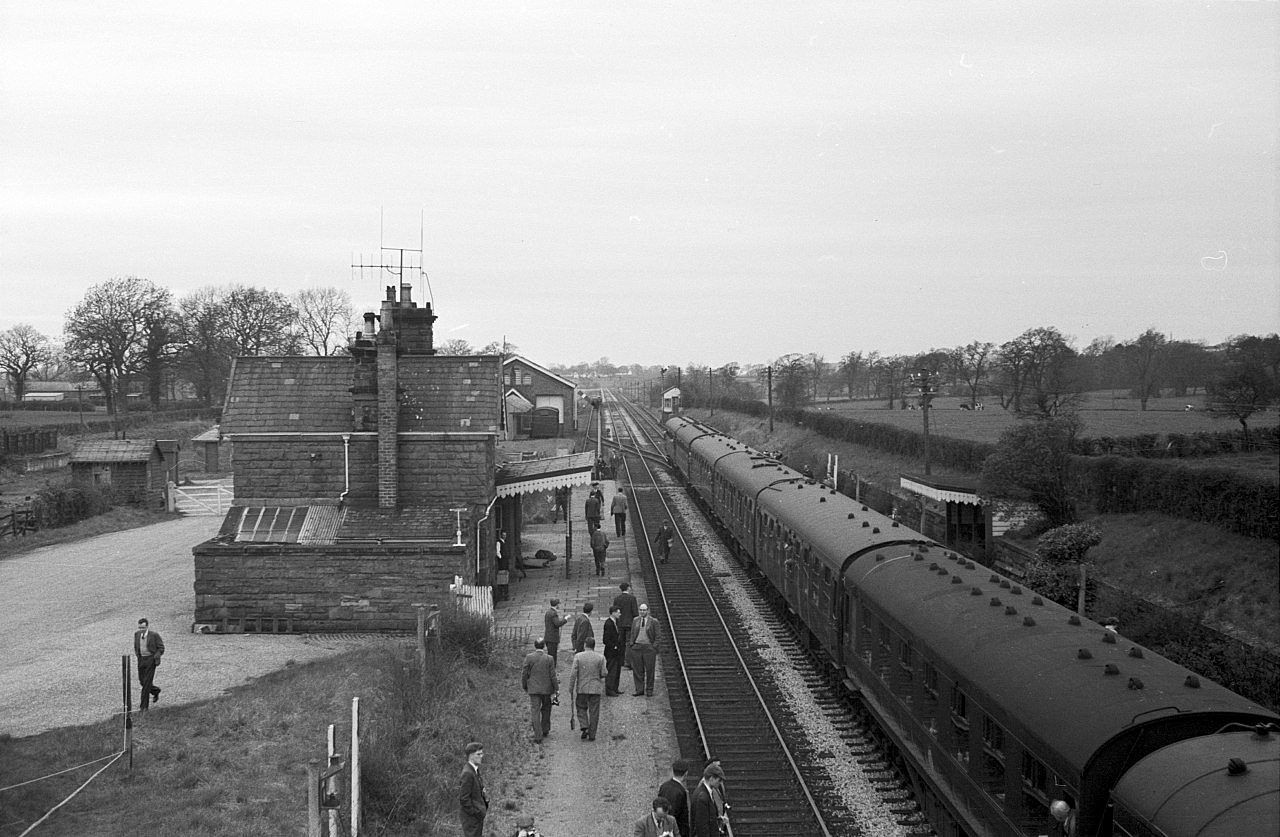
A railtour at Malpas Station 1963

The station building has been restored as offices and the area landscaped. Hampton Heath industrial estate of single storey buildings, including the former goods shed, is located on what was the trackbed immediately north of the old station.

When there were suggestions in 1974 that an attempt might be made to reopen the branch, the Chester Chronicle pointed out that none of its stations had been well sited or used. The paper stated that revival rumours were without foundation because the cost would be prohibitive.

Preceding station	Disused railways	Following station
Broxton; Line and station closed	London and North Western Railway; Whitchurch and Tattenhall Railway	Grindley Brook Halt; Line and station closed

== Bibliography ==
- Christiansen, Rex (1988). Forgotten Railways:Severn Valley and Welsh Border. David & Charles. ISBN 0-946537-43-7.
- Clinker, C. R. (October 1978). Clinker's Register of Closed Passenger Stations and Goods Depots in England, Scotland and Wales 1830–1977. Bristol: Avon-Anglia Publications & Services. ISBN 0-905466-19-5. OCLC 5726624.
- Collins, Frances; Collins, Martin (2017). U.S. Army Hospital Center 804: An Account of the US Military Hospitals in the Shropshire/Flintshire Area During World War II. Studley: Brewin Books. ISBN 978-1-85858-565-9. OCLC 1029094385.
- Mitchell, Vic; Smith, Keith (2013). Shrewsbury to Crewe, including the Tattenhall route. Midland Main Lines. Midhurst, West Sussex: Middleton Press. ISBN 9781908174482. OCLC 1302240443.
- Quick, Michael (2023) [2001]. Railway passenger stations in Great Britain: a chronology (PDF). version 5.05. Railway & Canal Historical Society.
- The Railway Clearing House (1970) [1904]. The Railway Clearing House Handbook of Railway Stations 1904 (1970 D&C Reprint ed.). Newton Abbot: David & Charles Reprints. ISBN 0-7153-5120-6.
- Yate, Bob (2014). The Shrewsbury to Crewe Line. Nottingham: Book Law Publications. ISBN 978-1-909625-33-4.
