= Hampton, Cheshire =

Former civil parish in Cheshire, England

Coordinates: 53.036968°N 2.747993°W

Hampton
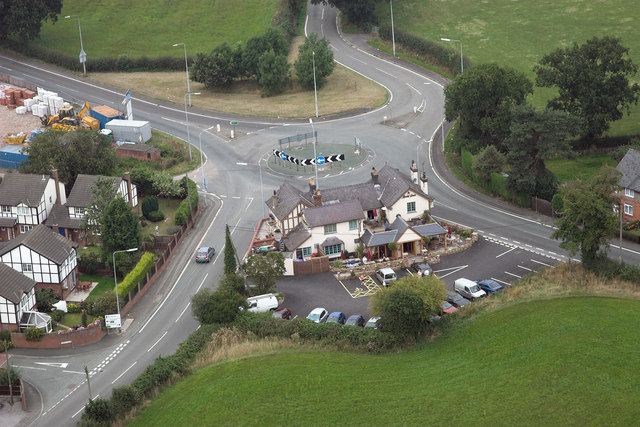
- Hampton Heath Roundabout on the A41

- Location within Cheshire
- Population: 405 (2011)
- OS grid reference: SJ498491
- Civil parish: No Man's Heath and District; Malpas
- Unitary authority: Cheshire West and Chester
- Ceremonial county: Cheshire
- Region: North West
- Country: England
- Sovereign state: United Kingdom
- Post town: MALPAS
- Postcode district: SY14
- Dialling code: 01948
- Police: Cheshire
- Fire: Cheshire
- Ambulance: North West

Hampton is a former civil parish, now in the parishes of No Mans Heath and District and Malpas, in the unitary authority of Cheshire West and Chester and the ceremonial county of Cheshire, England. According to the 2001 UK census, the total population of the civil parish was 409, decreasing marginally to 405 at the 2011 Census. The parish included Hampton Green. Hampton was formerly a township in the parish of Malpas, in 1866 Hampton became a separate civil parish, on 1 April 2015 the parish was abolished to form "No Man's Heath and District", part of it also went to Malpas.

The Whitchurch and Tattenhall Railway used to pass through Hampton and was the site of the Malpas railway station.

== See also ==
- Listed buildings in Hampton, Cheshire
- Hampton Old Hall
