= Birkenhead Monks Ferry railway station =

Former railway station in Birkenhead, Wirral, England

Birkenhead Monks Ferry
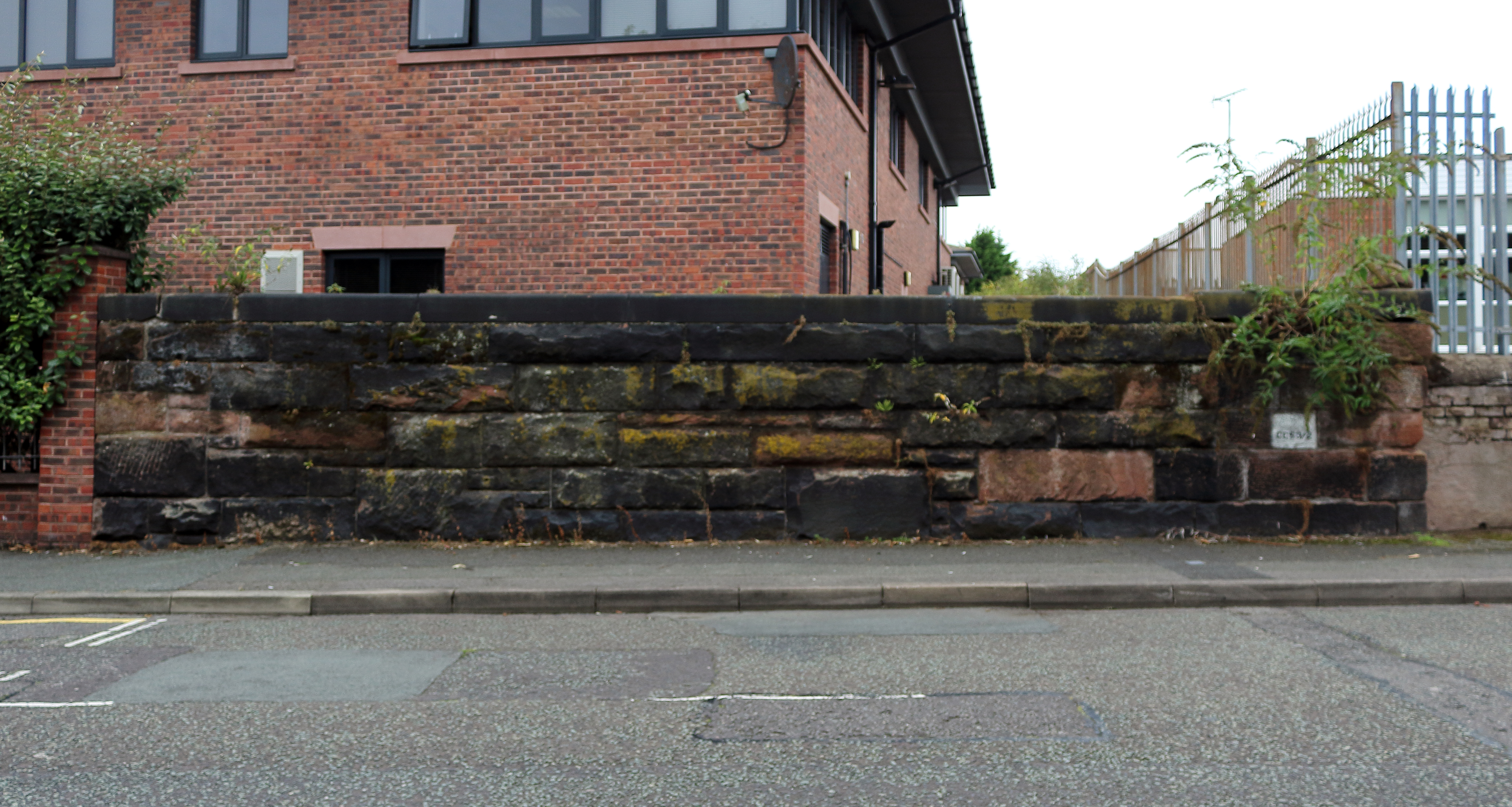
- Western parapet of the bridge carrying Church Street over lines into the station.

General information
- Location: Birkenhead, Cheshire; England
- Coordinates: 53.39085°N 3.01043°W
- Platforms: Two

Other information
- Status: Disused

History
- Opened: 23 October 1844
- Closed: 31 March 1878
- Original company: Chester and Birkenhead Railway
- Pre-grouping: Joint Great Western Railway/London and North Western Railway
Location

Birkenhead Monks Ferry railway station was a railway station in Birkenhead, Wirral, England. It was situated very close to the River Mersey named after the monks at Birkenhead Priory. For most of its life, the station was part of the Chester and Birkenhead Railway, a joint railway.

The station was originally opened without authority in April 1838. However, due to the objections and legal proceedings of the operators of the Woodside Ferry the station closed until it was purchased and reopened on 23 October 1844 via an extension of the line from Birkenhead Grange Lane. Subsequently, Grange Lane closed and Monks Ferry remained the main Birkenhead rail terminus for both passenger and goods traffic until the opening of Birkenhead Woodside on 1 April 1878. After this date, all passenger services were transferred to Woodside and Monks Ferry concentrated on goods and coal supply.

Provision was made at Monks Ferry for a connection to the internal rail system of shipbuilders Cammell Laird, which lay to the south of the station. This was via a set of sidings, with the connecting track at a right angle to station approaches.

Birkenhead Monks Ferry railway station closed for freight traffic in 1961, although the station and tracks survived until 1967.

The site has since been cleared, with little evidence left of its former use. A residential development now occupies the area.

Preceding station	Disused railways	Following station
Birkenhead Town; Line and station closed	GWR & LNWR; Chester & Birkenhead Railway	Terminus
