= Hampton Old Hall =

Country house in Hampton, Cheshire, England

Coordinates: 53.03725°N 2.73468°W

Hampton Old Hall is a country house in the parish of No Man's Heath and District, Cheshire, England. It is dated 1591, and was built for the Bromley family. There have been subsequent additions and alterations. Figueirdo and Treuherz describe it as "a puzzling and ambitious house, perhaps never completed". The main block is the earliest section, and consists of a close-studded timber-framed range with three gables. Adjoining it is a 17th-century timber-framed porch. Behind the porch is a south wing in brick and stone. The architectural historian Nikolaus Pevsner comments "there must be quite an interesting story behind all this". The house has been "restored and furnished ... in a solid and traditional farmhouse manor". It is designated by English Heritage as a Grade II* listed building. A timber-framed barn to the north of the hall, dating from the 17th century, is listed at Grade II.

== See also ==
- Listed buildings in Hampton, Cheshire
