= Chester railway station =

Railway station in Cheshire, England

Chester
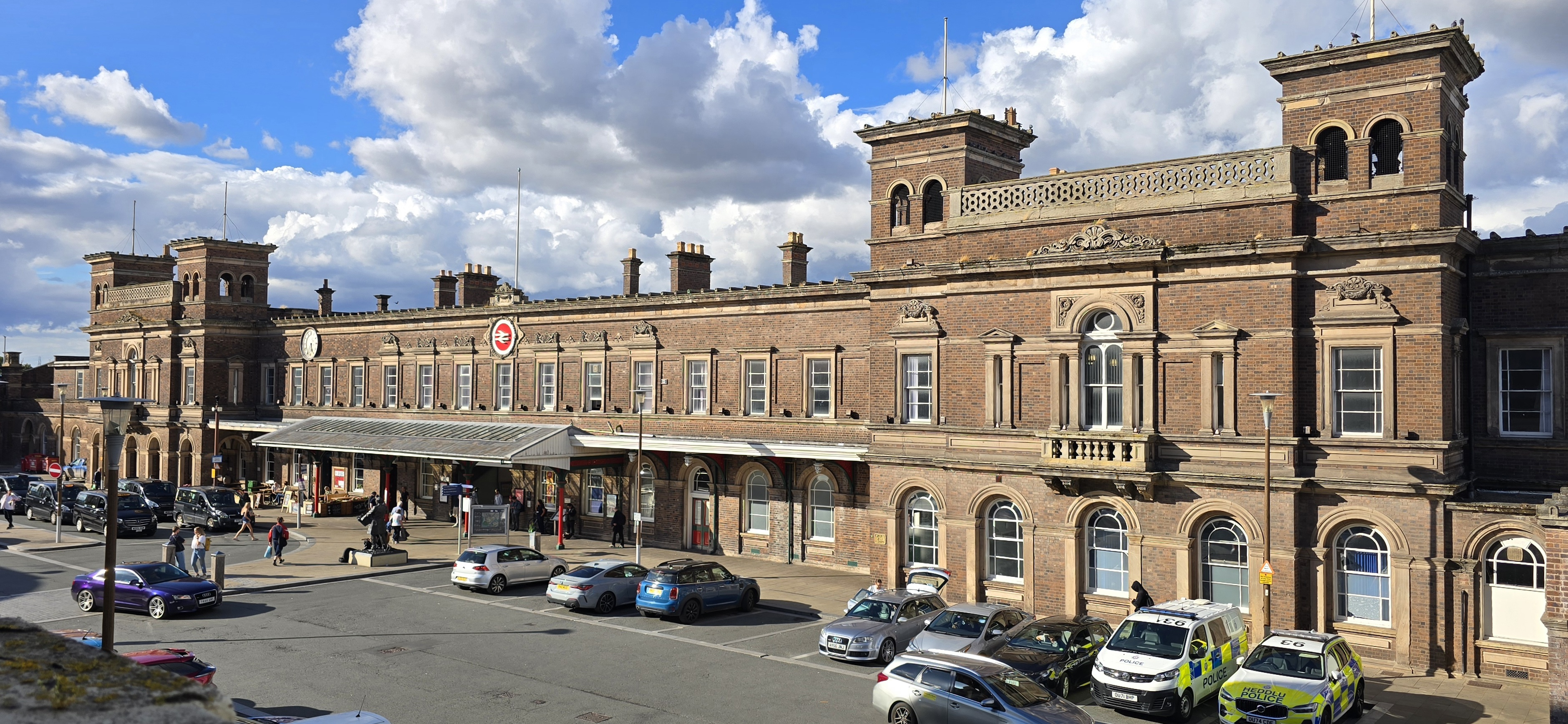
- The front of Chester station

General information
- Location: Station Road, Chester, Cheshire West and Chester, England
- Coordinates: 53.1968°N 2.8798°W
- Grid reference: SJ413669
- Owner: Network Rail
- Operator: Transport for Wales
- Transit authority: Merseytravel (for Merseyrail services only)
- Platforms: 7

Other information
- Station code: CTR
- Fare zone: G1
- Classification: DfT category B

History
- Original company: Joint ownership of L&NWR, C&HR, S&CR and BL&CJR
- Pre-grouping: Joint ownership of L&NWR and GWR
- Post-grouping: Joint ownership of LMS and GWR

Key dates
- 1 August 1848: Opened
- From 1872: Renamed Chester General
- 1969: Renamed Chester
- 8 May 1972: Chester General rail crash

Passengers
- 2020/21: ▼1.058 million
- Interchange: ▼0.137 million
- 2021/22: ▲3.443 million
- Interchange: ▲0.573 million
- 2022/23: ▲4.122 million
- Interchange: ▲0.689 million
- 2023/24: ▲4.727 million
- Interchange: ▲0.811 million
- 2024/25: ▲5.272 million
- Interchange: ▲0.835 million

Listed Building – Grade II*
- Feature: Chester railway station
- Designated: 31 July 1970
- Reference no.: 1375937
Location
Notes
- Passenger statistics from the Office of Rail & Road

Chester railway station serves the city of Chester, in Cheshire, England; it is sited in the Newtown area. It was designed by the architect Francis Thompson and opened as a joint station in 1848. From 1875 to 1969, the station was known as Chester General to distinguish it from Chester Northgate. The station is recorded in the National Heritage List for England as a Grade II* listed building.

== History ==
=== Names ===
Prior to 1848, there were two stations opposite each other across Brook Street; both were known as Chester to their respective users. They were superseded by a larger joint station that was also called Chester, although sometimes known as Chester Joint or Chester General. (Note: For example, an advertisement for the refreshment rooms in 1849 uses the name General,) The name of Chester General gradually came more into use from around 1870, to distinguish it from Chester Northgate, prior to it opening in 1875; it then reverted to Chester when Northgate closed in 1969.

=== Early stations ===
The first station at Chester was opened on the north-west side of Brook Street by the Chester and Birkenhead Railway (C&BR), when it opened its line from Birkenhead Grange Lane on 23 September 1840.

One week later, on 1 October 1840, the Grand Junction Railway (GJR) opened a separate station, on the south-eastern side of Brook Street, opposite the C&BR station, when it opened its branch from Crewe. This line and station had been planned and mostly constructed by the Chester and Crewe Railway (C&CR), but it ran out of capital before completing the line and were taken over by the GJR on 1 July 1840.

Relations between the C&BR and the C&CR had been cordial and collaborative with joint projects being undertaken. The C&BR had arranged to rent offices and other buildings from the C&CR; however, the GJR had been hostile to the C&BR from the beginning, seeing them as competitors for traffic to Liverpool, and their takeover of the C&CR caused the joint plans to fall through.

This resulted in the C&BR initially having no passenger accommodation at their station. In October 1840, their engineer reported that there "was a temporary wooden hut for a booking office but no passenger shed". Six months later "he confessed that a wooden hut had been used for five months, but latterly some houses in Brook Street had been converted into an office and waiting room, a large shed and a landing stage (platform) had been provided for the convenience of passengers."

The C&BR and the GJR lines were connected by a through line that avoided both stations. The two stations were connected across Brook Street, but the connecting line was gated and there were no through services, not even for the Royal Mail, whose bags were carried over the road.

To the south-east of Chester, there were two railways that had been authorised in the same parliamentary session in 1844 that planned to use Chester as their terminus. One was the Chester and Holyhead Railway (C&HR), which started constructing a line along the North Wales coast on 1 March 1845. The other was the Shrewsbury and Chester Railway (S&CR) constructing a line to Ruabon and Shrewsbury. (Note: The S&CR was formed by an amalgamation of the North Wales Mineral Railway (NWMR) and the Shrewsbury, Oswestry and Chester Railway (SO&CR) on 27 July 1846.) This line was planned to connect to the C&HR at Saltney Junction and use the C&HR line for the final 1 mile 67 chains (3.0 km) into the C&BR station in Chester. (Note: Railways in the United Kingdom are, for historical reasons, measured in miles and chains. A chain is 22 yards (20 m) long, there are 80 chains to the mile.)

Negotiations between these two railway companies started in November 1844, as the S&CR wanted to make sure that the C&HR section of line from Saltney Junction into Chester would be open when they were ready to use it. Negotiations continued until May 1846, when it was estimated that the section might be ready by October 1846. A minimum monthly toll of £2,000 (equivalent to £202,000 in 2025 (Note: UK Consumer Price Index inflation figures from 1209–2024 based on data from "Inflation calculator", Bank of England, London, 18 February 2026)) was agreed until the C&HR was finished.

The S&CR took possession of the section and started running trains into Chester on 4 November 1846. The C&HR retook possession of the Chester to Saltney section when it opened its own line as far as Bangor on 1 May 1848. The C&HR was operated by the London and North Western Railway (LNWR).

The Birkenhead, Lancashire and Cheshire Junction Railway (BL&CJR) was incorporated by the Birkenhead, Lancashire and Cheshire Junction Railway Act 1846 (9 & 10 Vict. c. xci) on 26 June 1846 and authorised to construct a line from Chester to Walton junction near Warrington where it connected to the GJR. The same act of Parliament authorised the BL&CJR and the C&BR to amalgamate, retaining the Birkenhead, Lancashire and Cheshire Junction Railway name.

In the meantime, the GJR amalgamated with several others to become the L&NWR on 16 July 1846.

=== Joint station 1848 to 1890 ===
By 1845, there were four railway companies having or planning their lines terminate at Chester and it became "apparent that the separate but adjoining stations would have to be replaced by something better"; a joint station was proposed. (Note: Traffic levels were increasing creating pressure for better facilities. For example, weekdays in August 1847 had nine arrivals and departures from the L&NWR Brook Street station, whilst the BL&CJR Brook Street station had 19, 12 for themselves and 7 for the S&CR. Weekdays in May 1848 had 9 arrivals and departures from the L&NWR Brook Street station, whilst the BL&CJR Brook Street station had 24, 12 for themselves, eight for the S&CR and four for the C&HR.) A site was selected south of the existing stations and east of Brook Street; it was an area of simple fields and kitchen gardens with a little brooklet, spanned by a rustic bridge, with the odd-sounding name of Flookersbrook.

In December 1846, the four project partners (the L&NWR, the C&HR, the S&CR and a joint partnership between the BL&CJR and the C&BR) agreed to share the cost of the land and buildings and a joint committee of one director from each company was set up. (Note: Above it was noted that the BL&CJR and the C&BR had amalgamated in June 1846, there was however some legal difficulties that had not been resolved, both companies were therefore included by name in the Acts.) Additionally, on 9 July 1847 the Mold Railway was granted parliamentary authority to construct its line which joined the C&HR at Saltney Ferry junction and it intended to use Chester as its terminus.

Shrewsbury and Chester Railway Act 1847
- Act of Parliament
- Parliament of the United Kingdom
- Long title: An Act to authorize the Shrewsbury and Chester Railway Company to make certain Branches, and to provide Station Room and other Conveniences in the City of Chester, and to raise additional Capital for these purposes; and for amending the former Acts relating to the said Company.
- Citation: 10 & 11 Vict. c. ccliv

Dates
- Royal assent: 9 July 1847

Text of statute as originally enacted

Chester and Holyhead Railway (Chester Extension and Amendment) Act 1847
- Act of Parliament
- Parliament of the United Kingdom
- Long title: An Act to authorize an Extension of and the Construction of a Station in connexion with the Chester and Holyhead Railway at Chester; and for other purposes.
- Citation: 10 & 11 Vict. c. cxlvii

Dates
- Royal assent: 9 July 1847

Text of statute as originally enacted

The station was authorised by two acts of Parliament: the Shrewsbury and Chester Railway Act 1847 (10 & 11 Vict. c. ccliv) and the Chester and Holyhead Railway (Chester Extension and Amendment) Act 1847 (10 & 11 Vict. c. cxlvii); both acts put in place the joint responsibility for building and altering access lines from the old stations to the new. Robert Stephenson was appointed as the engineer for the project. The station was designed by the architect Francis Thompson, assisted by C. H. Wild and was constructed by Thomas Brassey. The foundation stone was laid in August 1847. The station was opened on 1 August 1848, having cost £55,000 (equivalent to £5,660,000 in 2025).

It was designed with one very long platform, chiefly for departing trains, with two long bay platforms at each end and three shorter ones for terminating trains. The whole area was covered by a train shed, supported by cast iron columns designed by C. H. Wild. On the other side of the through tracks was "a large carriage shed with an iron and glass roof and beyond that a goods shed." A useful sketch of the station layout is in Biddle (1986) and Maund (2000).

The long single platform was used for trains running in opposite directions; it had a scissor (or crossover junctions) installed in the middle to enable two trains to occupy it and leave in either direction. This made the station very long and Thompson designed "a highly ornamental Venetian-style façade 1,050 feet (320 m) long in dark red brick with generously applied stone dressings and sculptured decoration" by John Thomas. (Note: There is some dispute over the colour of the bricks used, Biddle (2003) says they are "dark red", although earlier in his Railway Heritage, co-authored with Nock (1990), he describes tham as "buff"-coloured, Pevsner (2011) says they are "Staffordshire blue", Jenkins (2017) has them as "Purple-pink": they are recorded in the National Heritage list as "pale brown".)

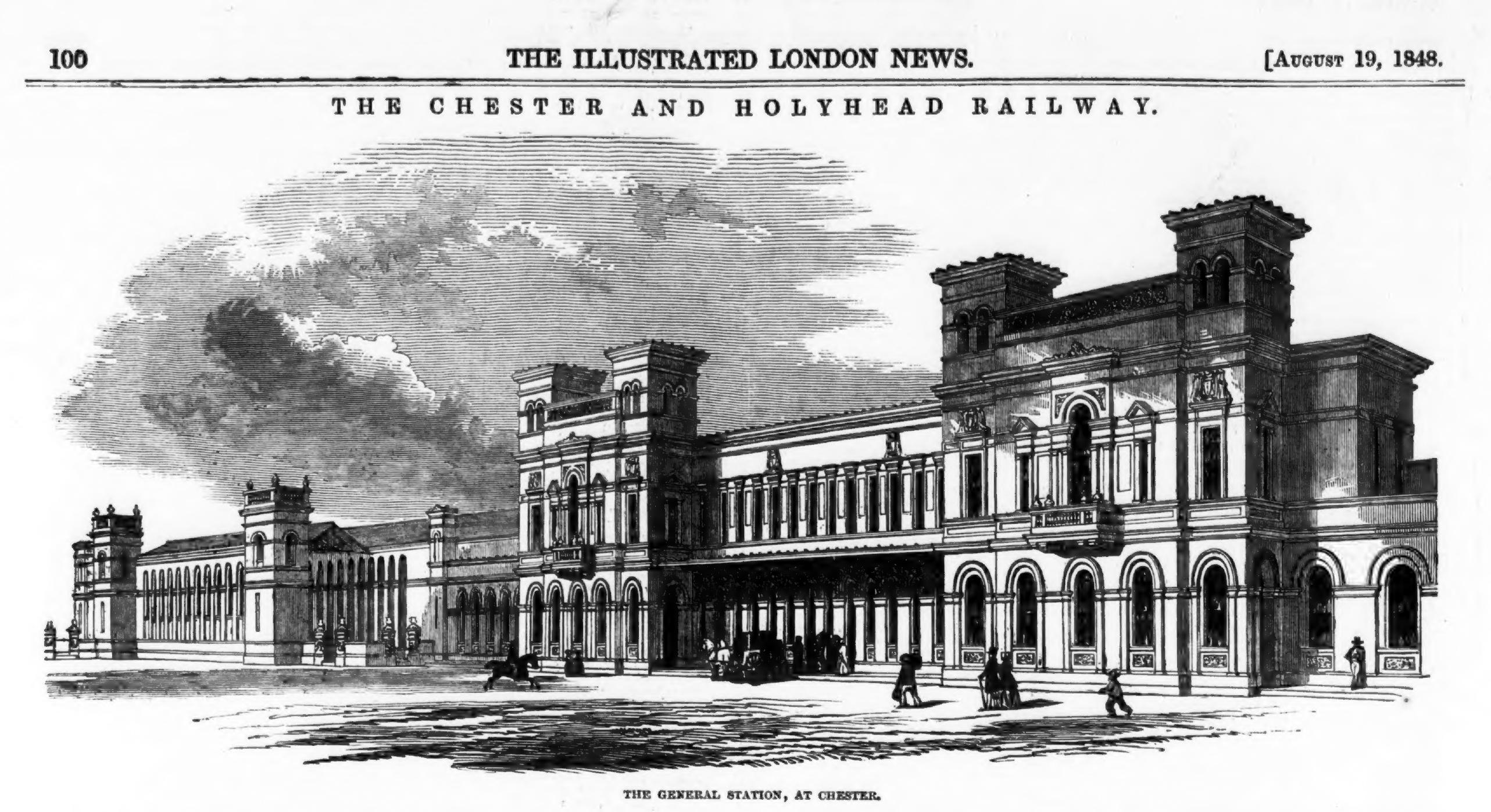
Chester General station, 1848

There was a central fifteen-bay two-storey entrance and office building, containing 50 rooms and offices. It was flanked by five bay projecting taller ornate, turreted, balconied sections; the whole was extended in both directions by arcaded screen walls terminating in lower towers. Windows in the central range are adorned with pediment carvings, described by Jenkins (2017) as "Hindu in character". Pedestrian access was protected by an entrance canopy with decorative ironwork.

The interior of the station had the principal passenger accommodation done in wood and plasterwork. The refreshment rooms were better decorated than the waiting rooms, having more elaborate plasterwork, decorated woodwork and a fine coffered ceiling. The refreshment room was run by Mr Hobday, who paid the joint station committee £500 per year for the right (equivalent to £55,000 in 2025).

The goods station, a substantial red and blue brick building, consisted of a shed 180 feet (55 m) long and 120 feet (37 m) wide; it has four railway and two cart entrances, at either end, and one railway entrance in front. It is covered by two large roofs, supported down the centre of the building by cast-iron columns and girders, and lighted by two skylights. To the west of the station, there was a triangular junction which allowed some trains to by-pass the station and was used to turn locomotives.

Brook Street needed to be moved to accommodate the station; at the same time, it was converted into a bridge over the station approach tracks. The bridge is of brick and stone, consisting of six girder and fifteen brick arches; the latter of which were converted into stabling.

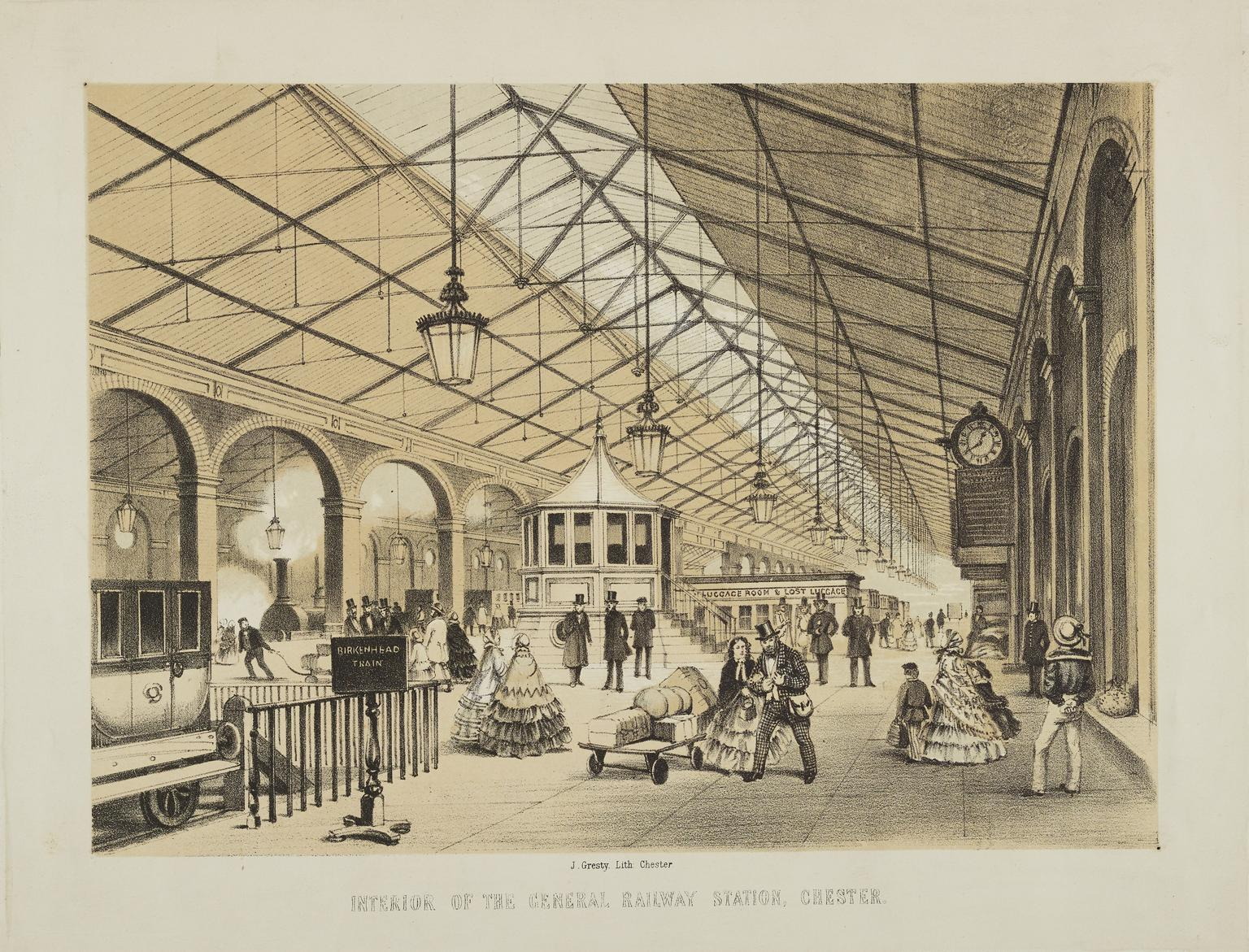
The interior of the station, circa 1860; the stationmaster's 'pagoda' is prominent.

There was long standing rivalry between the L&NWR and the GWR over access to the area, in particular to Birkenhead and Liverpool. This came to a head at Chester in 1849. The L&NWR was the most powerful of the joint committee partners and it had considerable influence over the C&HR whose trains it operated, and some influence over the BL&CJR who had so far not objected to the L&NWR's actions. The L&NWR ranged itself against the S&CR and its new partner the Shrewsbury and Birmingham Railway (S&BR) which opened a line from Shrewsbury to a temporary station at Wolverhampton on 12 November 1849. These two companies were a possible threat to the L&NWR by letting the GWR into the area.

After one quarrel over the routeing of passengers, the L&NWR refused to allow passengers to be booked to Wolverhampton or beyond via Shrewsbury, which was a sensible way to go but competed with the L&NWR route via Crewe; the L&NWR had the S&CR booking clerk forcibly ejected from his office. Connections with S&CR trains were deliberately timed to create inconvenience, and when the S&CR ran horse buses for the convenience of its passengers they found them barred from the station forecourt.

The Mold Railway opened on 14 August 1849; it ran two services daily into Chester and was operated by the L&NWR. The C&HR main line was connected throughout on 18 March 1850 and trains, operated by the L&NWR, started running through to Holyhead.

On 18 December 1850, the BL&CJR opened a line from Chester to Walton Junction, near Warrington, where it connected to the L&NWR railway running from Crewe to Warrington Bank Quay, now part of the West Coast Main Line.

Queen Victoria at Chester station in 1852

In January 1851, the S&CR and the S&BR entered into a mutual running agreement with the GWR and they became part of the GWR on 7 August 1854.

In 1858, the C&HR agreed to amalgamation with the L&NWR; this took effect on 1 January 1859 and included the Mold Railway.

In 1859, the BL&CJR changed its name to the Birkenhead Railway (BR). In 1860 it came to an arrangement with the L&NWR and the GWR jointly for them to work their railway. A joint committee was formed to do so, this was formalised by parliament in 1861. (Note: An Act for vesting the Birkenhead Railway in the London and North-Western Railway Company and the Great Western Railway Company, and for other Purposes.)

The committee decided to improve road access to the station, believing the approach by way of Brook Street was inadequate. The station needed a more direct access from Foregate Street. Unfortunately, the committee had no power to purchase properties for the purposes of road construction or improvement, but it did have some land in front of the station which it could utilise. Negotiations started in 1857 and, in 1860, the Queen Hotel opened opposite the station and connected to it via a covered passage. By 1866, the buildings which obstructed a better road access had been purchased and demolished and City Road, a wide, almost straight approach road was opened; unfortunately, the Queen Hotel blocked the view of the station clock, manufactured by J. B. Joyce & Co, from the new City Road above the station entrance and the clock was moved to an off-centre location closer to the left towered section.

A report in 1861 shows the station having a throughput of two million passengers, using an average of 115 trains daily. This level of traffic was catered for by 58 departing and 57 arriving trains. 44 of the arriving trains were divided and reformed into new trains; this work was done by two horses kept for the purpose. The station had one stationmaster, one inspector, ten clerks, six ticket collectors and examiners, 32 porters (including four foremen), and assorted greasers, police, watchmen, carriage examiners, shunters, waiting room attendants, cleaners and lamp men; a total of 82. There were ten more in the parcels office and 138 in the goods department, who dealt with an average of 130 daily goods trains.

A change of committee occurred in 1867. The L&NWR and the GWR had, at the time, eight joint committees including the BR and the Chester Joint Station Committee; all eight were merged into a L&NW & GW Railway Joint Committee. The change did not affect the workings of the individual concerns, except the line from Chester Joint station eastwards to where the line to Walton junction branched off, about 24 chains (1,600 ft; 480 m) was now considered part of the BR (see the junction diagram).

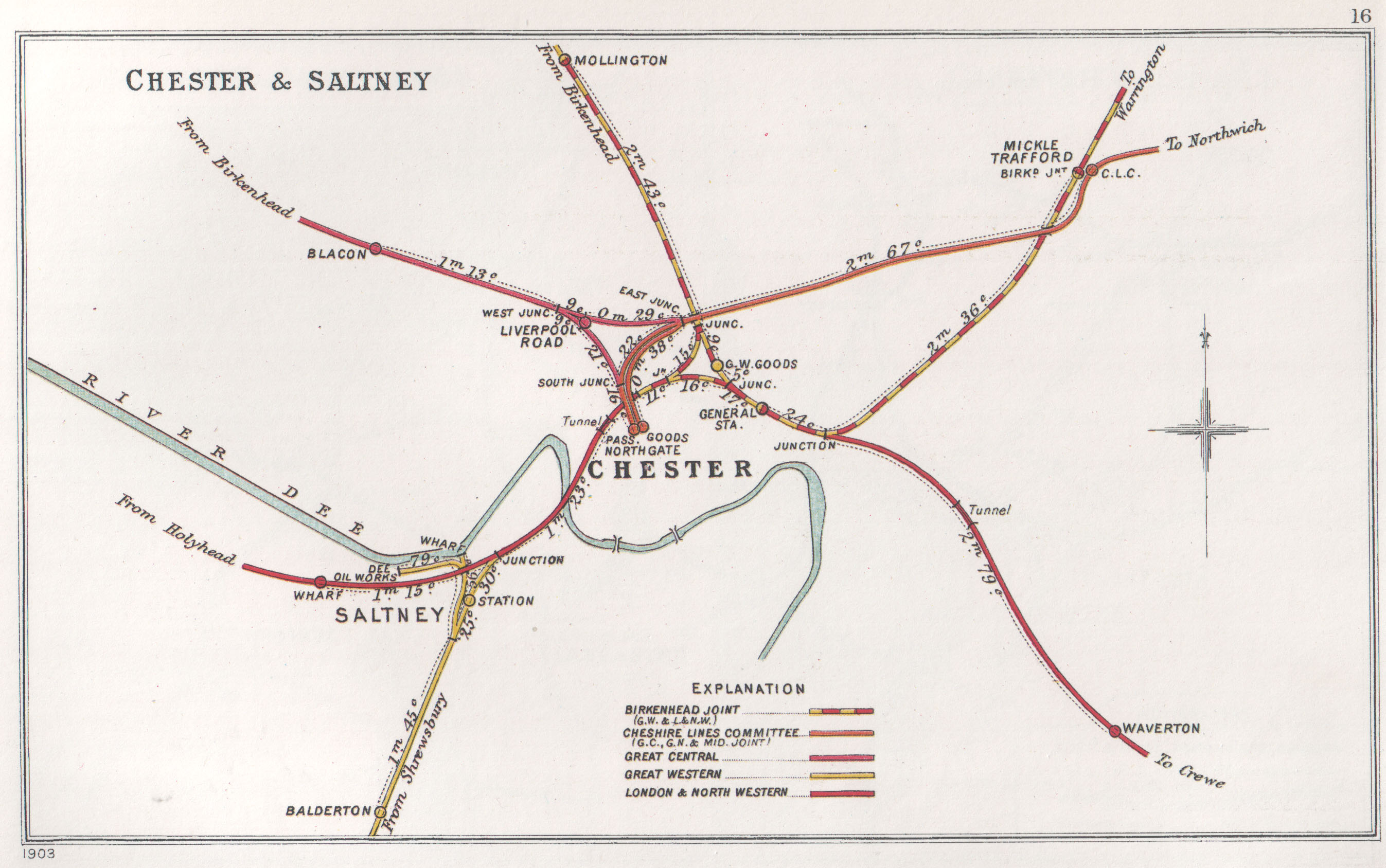
A 1903 Railway Clearing House Junction Diagram showing railways in the vicinity of Chester (centre, shown as GENERAL STA.)

On 1 May 1875, Chester Northgate railway station was opened by the Cheshire Lines Committee (CLC), to reduce confusion between the stations, this station, the older one was renamed Chester General although it had been frequently known by this name since opening in 1848.

In 1875 and 1885, there was a joint booking office by the station entrance, by 1905 each of the companies had their own booking office, L&NWR to the right as you entered and the GWR to the left.

From March 1876, a luncheon basket service for passengers on the Irish Mail was introduced at Chester station, the first in the country; it was described by Neele in 1904 as "either aristocratic or democratic, depending on the contents and cost."

=== Extended joint station since 1890 ===
In 1890, a new island platform was added and eight through lines provided; there were five bays at the Crewe end and three at the Holyhead. Additional buildings, extended roofing, two new footbridges and hydraulic luggage lifts completed the improvements.

The goods station had to be relocated to create the space to achieve this and it was moved further away from the passenger station, adjacent to Lightfoot Street, at the same time it became single sided with access from the Crewe end. The new warehouse opened on 7 January 1889; it had six lines running into the shed and five sidings outside. This shed and its yard were the L&NWR goods facility for the station; it was equipped with a 10-ton crane. The GWR goods facilities consisted of a shed and yard on the other side of, and accessed from, Brook Street. The access road sloped down past the cattle pens along the line towards Mollington; it was also equipped with a ten-ton crane.

The grouping had little effect on the station, whose owners went from being the L&NWR and the GWR to being the London, Midland and Scottish Railway (LMS) and the GWR.

The station was renovated between 1955 and 1961, with new platform coverings, track circuiting and colour-light signals.

Chester Northgate station was scheduled for closure on 6 October 1969. Before closing, a level junction was installed at Mickle Trafford so that trains from Manchester could run directly into Chester General; the junction had been removed in 1875.

On 7 November 2005, a plaque commemorating Thomas Brassey was installed on the wall opposite the booking office. Brassey was born at Buerton, 6 miles (9.7 km) south of Chester.

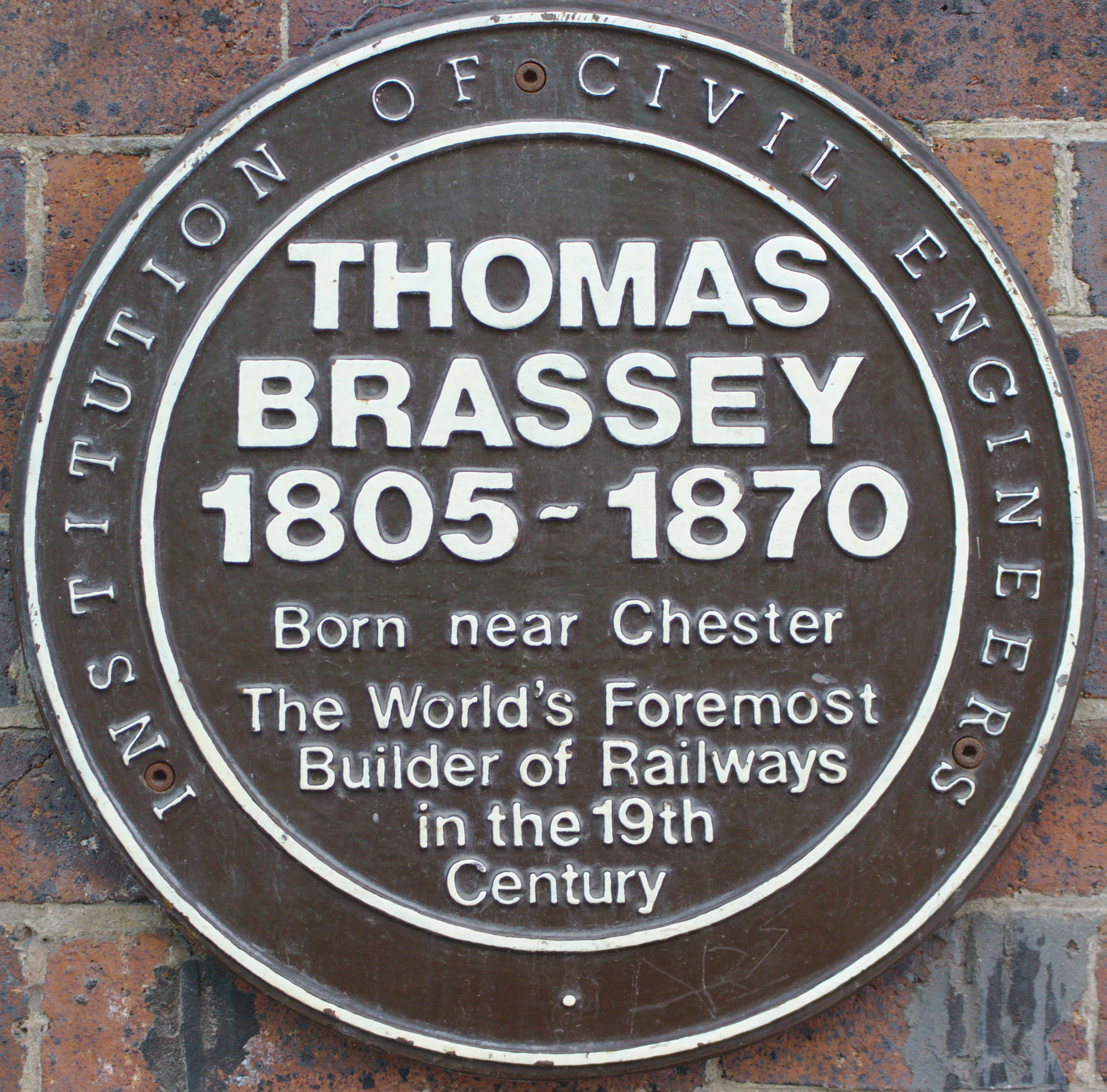
Brassey plaque

The Chester Renaissance Project was carried out between 2005 and 2007; it provided a new roof, improved customer facilities and better access to the station. Details included:

- Network Rail performed some groundworks around the east end frontage, repairs to the façade's east and west wings, renewed some of the roof's glazing and made enhancements to the train shed.
- Local traffic management was improved and better access to the station was achieved, by alterations to Station Square which were completed in December 2007.
- A new travel centre with improved customer facilities, refurbished toilets, café units and architectural lighting was installed by Arriva Trains Wales in October 2008.
- The wrought iron lattice girder footbridge originally provided in 1848 was refurbished and opened on 6 June 2013.

=== Service history ===
Local GWR trains operated to Ruabon, Shrewsbury and Wrexham General. Chester was served by most GWR express passenger trains; the service started on 1 May 1857, running from London Paddington initially to Birkenhead Monks Ferry, and then to Birkenhead Woodside after it opened in 1878. In 1880, a fast train was introduced, taking 4 hours and 50 minutes, more than an hour faster than previously from London. The return train was not quite so fast, taking 5 hours and 20 minutes. By 1912, the fastest service took 4 hours 15 minutes; there were normally six trains daily.

The GWR introduced other long-distance services from time to time, often just during the summer. In July 1922, there were through trains to Leamington Spa, Dover Marine, Pwllheli, Southampton Town, Bournemouth (Note: The weekdays daily train to Southampton Town and Bournemouth had started from Manchester London Road and got to Chester via Birkenhead Woodside; it replaced a through carriage service that had started in 1903.), Aberystwyth and through carriages to Barmouth.

Calling at Chester involved a reversal of train direction for GWR trains; the fastest services therefore used the curve to avoid the station. For some years, the Chester portion of the Birkenhead train was detached at Wrexham; it had even been known for it to be detached in the cutting, west of the station. The final service from London Paddington ran on 4 March 1967, specially named The Zulu; it was hauled by 7029 Clun Castle from Banbury to Birkenhead.

Local L&NWR trains ran to Crewe, Stafford, Whitchurch, Corwen, Liverpool Lime Street and Manchester Exchange.

Through fares to London were available by 1847. The local newspaper advertisement indicated that the service was on a single train, but Bradshaw (1847) suggests that a change of trains would be needed at Birmingham. By 1850 trains were running through; there were six services, with four continuing to Bangor.

The L&NWR service to and from London Euston was taking around 4 hours. There were an average of fourteen daily trains in 1922; eight of which, including the twice daily Irish Mails, continued to Holyhead. There were also a couple of services going to Holyhead that ran through Chester without stopping.

The joint lines of the BR were worked by both companies: the L&NWR and the GWR, which led to some GWR locomotives taking trains from Chester to Manchester Exchange.

Regular L&NWR services to Liverpool Lime Street via the Halton Curve were withdrawn on 5 May 1975. Line usage was reduced to a scheduled parliamentary summer Saturdays-only return service between Liverpool Lime Street and Chester.

In 1987, the station had nearly 120 departures each weekday with local diesel multiple unit services to Hooton, Helsby, Manchester via Northwich and Warrington, and Wrexham. Main line services were still locomotive-hauled; there were boat trains and early morning newspaper trains from Manchester.

On 3 September 1993, the Merseyrail network was extended and electrified, using the 750 volt DC third rail system; the Wirral Line line from Hooton connected to Chester station. The line provided an every 15 minute peak and an every 30 minutes off-peak service to Birkenhead and Liverpool. The extension uses platform 7, the only one that has been electrified.

The Halton Curve services restarted running in May 2019, providing Chester with a direct link to Liverpool Airport via Liverpool South Parkway and an alternative route to Liverpool city centre with trains running to Liverpool Lime Street.

In January 2016, according to the Office of Rail and Road, passenger numbers doubled over the previous ten years, making Chester the eighth-busiest station in the North-West region. The rise was attributed to new services, such as direct trains to London and increased frequencies on the Merseyrail network.

=== Excursion traffic ===
Chester has generally been a desirable destination for excursion traffic. In 1857, "up to a third of a million excursion passengers reportedly passed through Chester station during the second half-year, around 12,000 a week." It was further reported in 1858 that "over 52,000 excursionists visited Chester by rail in Whit week."

The three day race meeting in May is the busiest time of the year, with cup day being the most popular. As early as 1848, the stations had to cope with despatching 426 carriages in the hours after the meeting. In 1905, the station staff dealt with 358 arrivals and departures over thirteen hours; a crowded train every two minutes.

There were also excursions from Chester, when Brunel's SS Great Eastern was at Holyhead in October 1859; as many as fifteen excursion trains a day were organised from Chester to visit it.

=== Stationmasters ===
When the station was constructed, an octagonal office with a pagoda roof was constructed in its centre for the stationmaster. From the opening of the joint station, the management committee decided the stationmaster should be neutral; that is, not recruited from any of the participant companies.

- William Paget ca. 1847
- Mr. Jones ca. 1849
- John Critchley ca. 1850–1855 (later superintendent of the Oxford, Worcester and Wolverhampton Railway)
- Charles Mills ca. 1859–1872
- David Meldrum 1872–1882
- W. Thorne 1882–1890 (formerly stationmaster at Hereford Barrs Court)
- John Thomas Reddish 1890–1902
- W.G. Marrs 1903–1909
- John Ratcliffe 1910–1926
- Robert McNaught 1926–1932
- Lewis Evans 1932 1934
- A.E. Mawson 1934–1942 (formerly stationmaster at Woodside)
- John Moore 1943–1950 (formerly stationmaster at Birkenhead Dock)
- Percy Jackson 1950–1955
- Eric L Thompson 1955–1963 (formerly stationmaster at Bedford)
- Kenneth Conyers Winterton 1963–1964
- Mr. Mapstone ca. 1967 - ca. 1969

=== Accidents ===
- On 4 July 1949, a Derby to Llandudno passenger train ran into the rear of a Crewe to Holyhead service, injuring fifty people.
- Chester General rail crash: on 8 May 1972, a freight train suffered a brake failure and collided with a diesel multiple unit at Chester General station and caught fire, causing severe damage to the building and the trains involved. The portion of the overall station roof between platforms 5/6 and the main building, which had been damaged by the collision and fire, had to be removed.
- On 20 November 2013, a Class 221 Super Voyager diesel-electric multiple unit from London Euston to Chester collided with the buffer stops on platform 1, riding up over them and smashing a glass screen. There were no injuries, although one passenger was taken to hospital for checks. A Rail Accident Investigation Branch report stated that the incident was due to exceptionally slippery rails, but that the consequences of this were made more severe by the buffer stop being of an older design which did not absorb the impact energy effectively. The report further stated that that particular stop had not undergone a risk assessment within the previous ten years, and was possibly not appropriate for Class 221 units.

== Facilities ==
The station has a booking office that is staffed from 15 minutes before the first train until 15 minutes after the last train. There are live departure and arrival screens and a shop. A pub called The Station Tap has been operated by Spitting Feathers in the station since April 2025. It has lifts and is fully accessible for disabled users. There is a car park with 83 spaces and cycle racks for 68 bicycles.

== Layout ==
The station has seven platforms:

1. is a bay platform located at the eastern end. Used by TfW services to Crewe. A second platform alongside it is unused, but may be used for stock stabling.
2. at the western end is another bay platform. Used by TfW services
3. is a through bi-directional platform and is closest to the concourse; it is split into sections 'a' (eastern) and 'b' (western). Used by Avanti West Coast and TfW services
4. (opposite platform 3 on the island platform) is another through bi-directional platform, with sections designated as 4a and 4b. Used by Avanti West Coast and TfW services
5. is an east-facing bay, in the centre of the island, closest to platform 4. Used by Northern Trains and TfW services
6. is another east facing bay, behind platform 5 and closest to platform 7. Used by Northern Trains services.
7. is a through platform, the only one with third-rail electrification, with sections designated as 7a and 7b. Used by Merseyrail services.

== Services ==
Chester is served by four train operating companies; the typical off-peak service in trains per hour/day is:

=== Transport for Wales ===
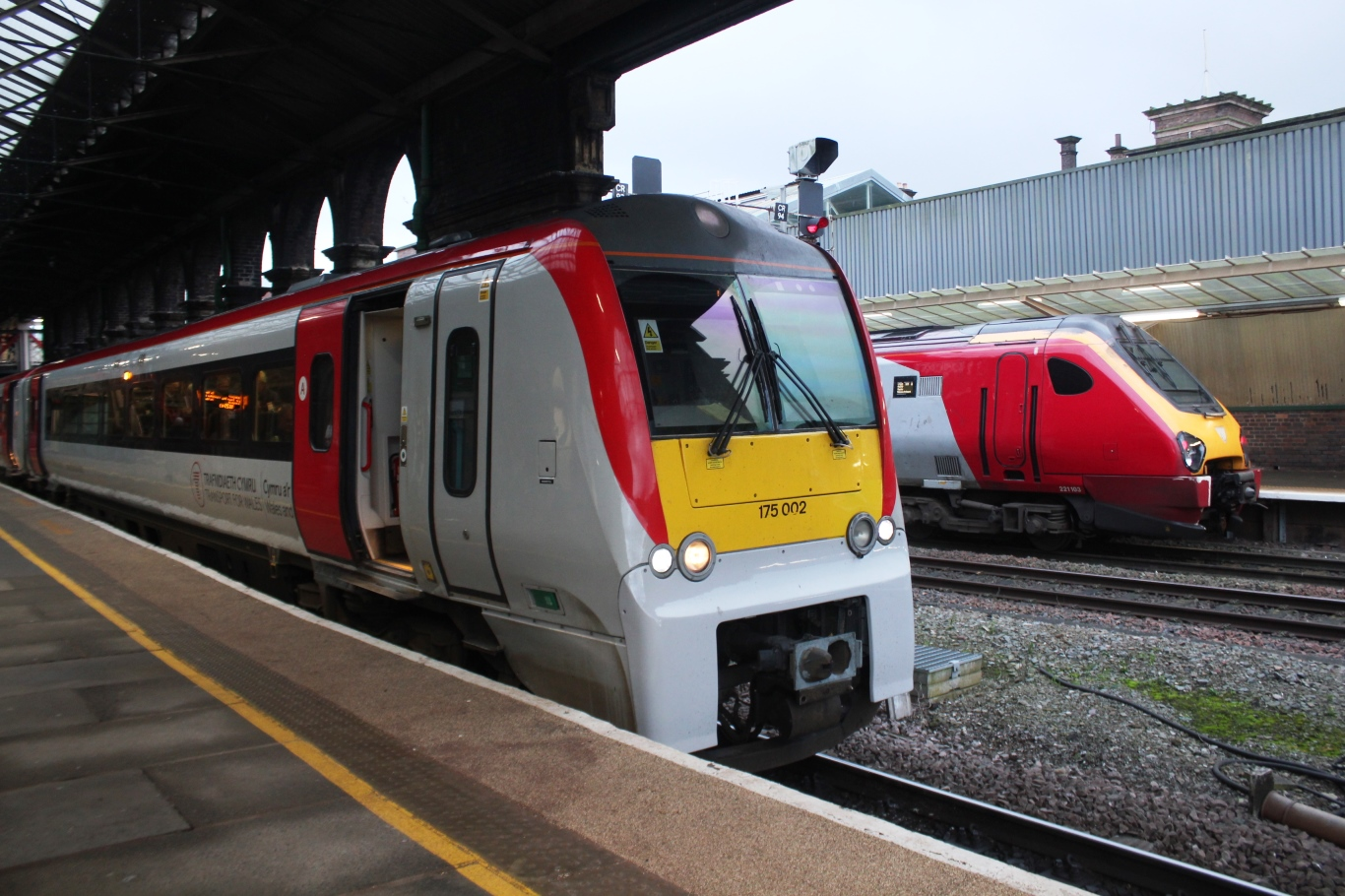
A KeolisAmey Wales Class 175 and an Avanti West Coast Super Voyager, January 2020

- 1 tph to Crewe
- 1 tph to Wrexham General and Shrewsbury; of which:
  - 1 tp2h continues to Cardiff Central
  - 1 tp2h continues to Birmingham International
- 1 tph to Holyhead, via Bangor
- 1 tph to Llandudno, via Llandudno Junction
- 1 tph to Liverpool Lime Street, via Runcorn, using the Halton Curve
- 1 tph to Manchester Airport, via Warrington Bank Quay and Manchester Piccadilly
- 3 tpd to Shrewsbury
- 3 tpd to Wrexham General
- 1 tpd to Cardiff Central, known as Y Gerallt Gymro / Premier Service.

=== Avanti West Coast ===
- 1 tph to London Euston, via Crewe with most services also calling at Stafford
- 1 tp2h to Holyhead, via Bangor
- 1 tpd to Wrexham General.

=== Merseyrail ===
A Merseyrail map, with Chester to the south of the network

- 4 tph to Liverpool Central, via Birkenhead; 2 tph on late evenings and Sundays.

=== Northern Trains ===
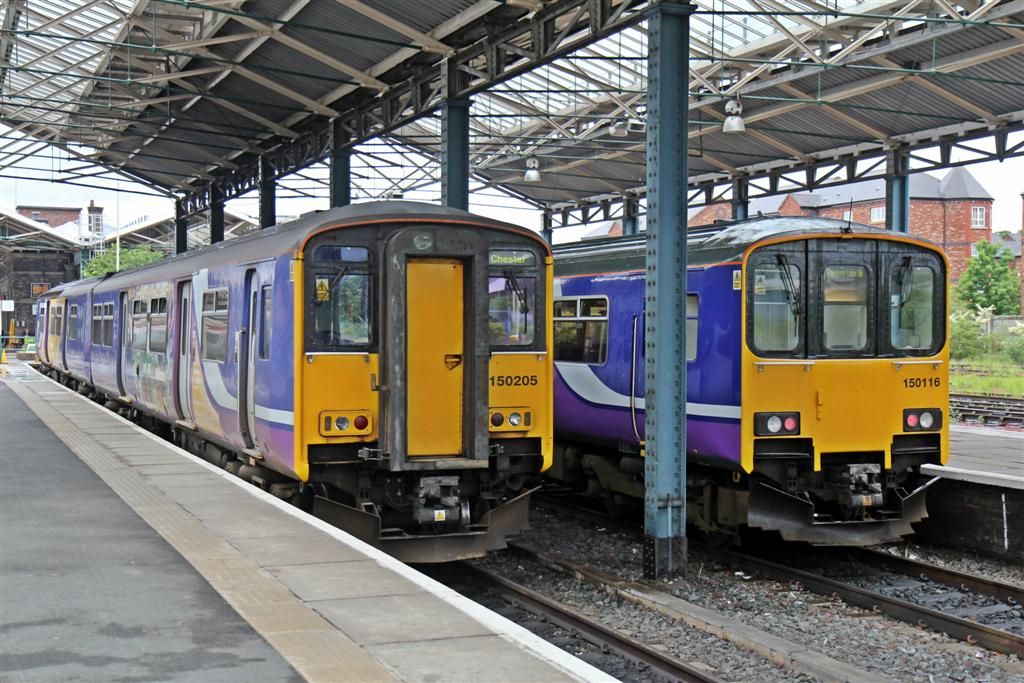
Two Northern Rail Class 150s

- 1 tph to Manchester Piccadilly, via Northwich and Stockport, on the Mid-Cheshire Line; 1 tp2h operates on Sundays
- 1 tph to Leeds, via Warrington Bank Quay, Manchester Victoria and Bradford Interchange.

Preceding station	National Rail	Following station
Flint	Transport for Wales Rail; Holyhead–Cardiff Central	Wrexham General
Flint	Transport for Wales Rail; Holyhead–Birmingham International	Wrexham General
Shotton	Transport for Wales Rail; Holyhead–Manchester Airport	Helsby
Shotton	Transport for Wales Rail; Llandudno–Liverpool Lime Street	Helsby
Wrexham General	Transport for Wales Rail; Wrexham General–Chester	Crewe
Flint	Avanti West Coast; Holyhead–London Euston	Crewe
Wrexham General	Avanti West Coast; Wrexham General–London Euston	Crewe
Terminus	Avanti West Coast; Chester–London Euston	Crewe
Terminus	Northern Trains; Mid-Cheshire Line	Mouldsworth
Terminus	Northern Trains; Chester–Leeds	Warrington Bank Quay
Bache	Merseyrail; Wirral line Chester–Liverpool Central	Terminus
	Historical railways	
Queensferry; Line open, station closed	Chester and Holyhead Railway later London and North Western Railway	Terminus
Saltney; Line open, station closed	Shrewsbury and Chester Railway later Great Western Railway	Terminus
Mollington; Line open, station closed	Birkenhead, Lancashire and Cheshire Junction Railway formerly Chester and Birkenhead Railway later Birkenhead Railway (L&NWR & GWR joint)	Terminus
Terminus	Birkenhead, Lancashire and Cheshire Junction Railway; Chester to Walton Junction line later Birkenhead Railway (L&NWR & GWR joint)	Mickle Trafford
Terminus	Grand Junction Railway formerly Chester and Crewe Railway later London and North Western Railway	Black Dog; Line open, station closed
	Disused railways	
Saltney Ferry; Branch line and station closed	Mold Railway later London and North Western Railway	Terminus
Terminus	London and North Western Railway; Whitchurch and Tattenhall Railway	Black Dog; Branch line and station closed

== See also ==
- Grade II* listed buildings in Cheshire West and Chester
- Chester TMD
