= Whitchurch and Tattenhall Railway =

Railway line in Cheshire

Coordinates: 53.1°N 2.78°W

Overview
- Locale: Cheshire
- Termini: Whitchurch; Tattenhall Junction
- Stations: 3 in 1872; 4 in 1938

History
- Opened: 1 October 1872
- Closed to passengers: 16 September 1957
- Closed to freight: 4 November 1963

Technical
- Line length: 14 miles 38 chains (23.3 km)
- Track gauge: 1,435 mm (4 ft 8 1/2 in) standard gauge

The Whitchurch and Tattenhall Railway was a branch line in Cheshire built by the London and North Western Railway (L&NWR) opening in 1872. The branch, which was 14.5 mi (23.3 km) long, connected the North Wales Coast Line from Chester General with the Welsh Marches line and Oswestry, Ellesmere and Whitchurch Railway at Whitchurch. Although a branch line, the route was built to main line standards with double track along its entire length. It was used on occasion to stable the British Royal Train in sidings on the eve of official visits by members of the royal family.

== History ==
=== Authorisation, construction and opening ===
London and North Western Railway (New Lines) Act, 1866
- Act of Parliament
- Parliament of the United Kingdom
- Long title: An Act for enabling the London and North-western Railway Company to construct new Railways; and for other Purposes.
- Citation: 29 & 30 Vict.

Dates
- Royal assent: 16 July 1866

Text of statute as originally enacted

Construction powers were obtained in the London and North Western Railway (New Lines) Act, 1866 which received Royal Assent on 16 July 1866. (Note: An Act for enabling the London and North-western Railway Company to construct new Railways; and for other Purposes.)

The railway was to be double track throughout and was to be completed within five years. Further Acts, were obtained to allow minor changes of route around Malpas, the London and North Western Railway (New Lines) Act, 1867, (Note: An Act for enabling the London and North-western Railway Company to construct new Railways, Deviations, and other Works; and for other Purposes.)) and to extend the time allowed for construction, the London and North Western Railway (New Works and Additional Powers) Act, 1869, which passed on 12 July 1869 and permitted a further three years from that date for completion. (Note: An Act for conferring additional powers on the London and North-western Railway Company for the construction of new works, and in relation to their own undertaking and the undertakings of other Companies; and for other purposes.)

London and North Western Railway (New Lines) Act 1867
- Act of Parliament
- Parliament of the United Kingdom
- Long title: An Act for enabling the London and North-western Railway Company to construct new Railways; and for other Purposes.
- Citation: 30 & 31 Vict.

Dates
- Royal assent: 15 July 1867

Text of statute as originally enacted

London and North Western Railway (New Works and Additional Powers) Act 1869
- Act of Parliament
- Parliament of the United Kingdom
- Long title: An Act for conferring additional powers on the London and North-western Railway Company for the construction of new works, and in relation to their own undertaking and the undertakings of other Companies; and for other purposes.
- Citation: 32 & 33 Vict.

Dates
- Royal assent: 12 July 1869

Text of statute as originally enacted

Tenders for the construction works were invited in February 1870 and a contract was awarded to Scott & Edwards of Wigan by April 1870. The L&NWR appointed William Clarke, of Westminster as the Principal Engineer with work commencing on 18 April when the 'first sod' was cut with minimal ceremony.

Colonel Rich of the Board of Trade's Railway Inspectorate made an inspection of the line on 21 September 1872, his report, although identifying some issues needing improvement, allowed for the line to open.

The line opened on 1 October 1872.

=== Route ===
The L&NWR built this line to connect its traffic from South Wales to the Merseyside docks and to the Holyhead route for Ireland, avoiding the congestion that had built up around Crewe.

The line was obviously in competition with the GWR but the L&NWR were at pains to emphasise that it was not meant as a competitor to the GWR route from Shrewsbury to Chester, as it desired to keep on good terms with the GWR, it apparently had little impact on the GWR. Nonetheless this new route would be some 3 3/4 miles (6.0 km) shorter than the GWR route, and did not include gradients as steep as Gresford Bank, which was nearly four miles at 1 in 82½, and thus made for heavy going for southbound freights.

The line was 14 miles 38 chains (23.3 km) long, from a junction at Whitchurch in the county of Salop with the Shrewsbury and Crewe branch of the Company's railway to a junction with the Company's Chester and Crewe Branch at Hatton. (Note: Formerly the Chester and Crewe Railway but by this time part of the L&NWR's North Wales Main Line) (Note: Railways in the United Kingdom are, for historical reasons, measured in miles and chains. A chain is 22 yards (20 m) long, there are 80 chains to the mile.)

The line opened from the existing station at Whitchurch with stations at Malpas, serving the village of Hampton Heath where the station was situated and Malpas which was 1.4 mi (2.3 km) distant, Broxton and Tattenhall then joining the Chester and Crewe line at Tattenhall junction and on through Waverton to Chester General.

A further station, Grindley Brook Halt was opened between Whitchurch and Malpas from 1938 to 1957.

== Traffic ==
=== Passengers ===
The passenger service was never extensive. When the branch opened there were seven daily passengers services in each direction, except on Sundays when there was no service. Of the services from Chester General, the 'up' direction, (Note: Down trains usually headed away from the major conurbation, usually London, some railway companies ran 'up' to their headquarters location. Up in this case was towards Whitchurch.) two ran non-stop to Whitchurch with one of them continuing on the joint GWR & L&NWR line (the former Shrewsbury and Hereford Railway) to Hereford via Shrewsbury.

In the 'down' direction one service ran through from Hereford and was non-stop from Whitchurch to Chester General. Oddly, the afternoon departure from Whitchurch did not stop at Tattenhall.

By 1887 the service pattern was seven daily departures in each direction, with at least one each way going to or from Shrewsbury, the afternoon train still did not stop at Tattenhall. In 1895 the service had reduced to six trains in each direction and Tattenhall was served by all of them.

By 1922 the service had increased slightly with seven trains to Whitchurch and eight the other way, with an extra one on Saturdays. In 1939 the service was again reduced to five services in each direction.

In 1951 the service remained at five services in each direction, although not always at the same times on each day, there was an additional Wednesday service from Chester that had through carriages to Shrewsbury, there was no reciprocal service.

=== Freight ===
The line was primarily built to serve coal-fired shipping, which needed steam coal and was mined in the South Wales Coalfield, and the coal export market out of Birkenhead. Most of the freight traffic was for this purpose, in June 1888 there were ten daily 'down' freight trains, with an extra two on Sundays but two less on Mondays, all but two of which were Abergavenny to Birkenhead coal trains, the other two were local goods trains. In the 'up' direction there were nine daily workings, with an extra two on Mondays and one on Sundays which were all returning coal empties from Birkenhead, except for the returning daily local goods.

By the end of World War I the advantages of oil fired ships became apparent, and the Navy began building or rebuilding its fleet accordingly. Similarly, but rather more slowly, the merchant ships were converted. There was a consequent and dramatic decline in coal goods traffic, in 1929 there were just two workings each way on most days. The ‘down’ workings comprised one daily local goods, calling at all stations, and one Abergavenny Junction to Mold Junction coal train. In the ‘up’ direction, the return coal empties from Mold Junction to Abergavenny ran on Mondays only. Other southbound workings were two local freights, one non-stop, from Chester to Whitchurch, and a local goods stopping at all stations. There was no traffic on Sundays, so the line could be closed completely for that day.

By 1931 the Abergavenny to Mold workings had been suspended, leaving just the two local goods each way.

By 1946 when there were two daily local goods each way, one of which ran between Whitchurch and Malpas only, the other reaching Chester. There was one through goods in each direction: down it went from Harlescott Sidings (just north of Shrewsbury) to Birkenhead, up from Chester to Coleham (just south of Shrewsbury).

With the cessation of passenger services in September 1957 the only local goods working was a through return daily working between Crewe Gresty Lane and Broxton which also called at Malpas.

By 1961 however, the line had become the preferred option for oil tank workings from Ellesmere Port, Hooton and Stanlow Oil Refinery, destined mainly for the Midlands.

=== Royal train ===
The railway was sometimes used as an overnight stop by the Royal Train during official visits by the British Royal family to North West England or The Midlands. The train would spend the night on the eve of a visit in the sidings at Malpas. During the First World War the Royal train carrying George V and Queen Mary stayed at the station in May 1917. During their stay, they were guarded by troops from the Household Division.

Likewise during the Second World, George VI stopped the night at Malpas in July 1942 before touring munitions factories in the Midlands. His daughter, Princess Elizabeth stayed April 1951. Princess Margaret stopped in May 1954.

The last time the Royal Train stayed the night in Malpas' sidings was October 1955 following a journey from York. It was on the eve of an official visit to The Potteries by Elizabeth II, with her husband Prince Philip.

== Closure ==
After the line closed to passenger traffic on 16 September 1957, two of the stations, Malpas and Broxton remained open for goods traffic until 1963. During this time, it was used to test the British Rail GT3, an experimental gas turbine locomotive.

Its final service was a southbound block train taking oil wagons from Stanlow Oil Refinery to the oil depot/terminal (closed 1984) at Rowley Regis in November 1963. The line was closed on 4 November 1963.

== Accidents ==
Two fatalities were recorded near Grindley Brook crossing. The first occurred shortly after the line opened in 1872 when a 70-year-old woman was struck by a train heading towards Whitchurch; although the driver sounded his whistle, he was unable to stop in time. On 1 January 1874 a goods train driver heading towards Chester saw a body in a lineside ditch. An inquest concluded the deceased had been "accidentally killed by a train on the London and North-Western Railway, while crossing the Grindley Brook crossing."

Despite the railway's complete closure, 200 yd (180 m) double track at its northern end was retained as refuge sidings. The line's former signal box at Tattenhall Junction controlled access to the sidings from the North Wales Coast Line. The box and sidings were used until the late 1970s before the old junction and signal box were removed in the 1980s. In July 1971 a 10-car special school excursion train from Rhyl to Smethwick derailed as it passed through the former Tattenhall Junction. Hot weather created thermal stress that caused the track to shift derailing the last three carriages; two children were killed and 26 injured.

== Preservation ==
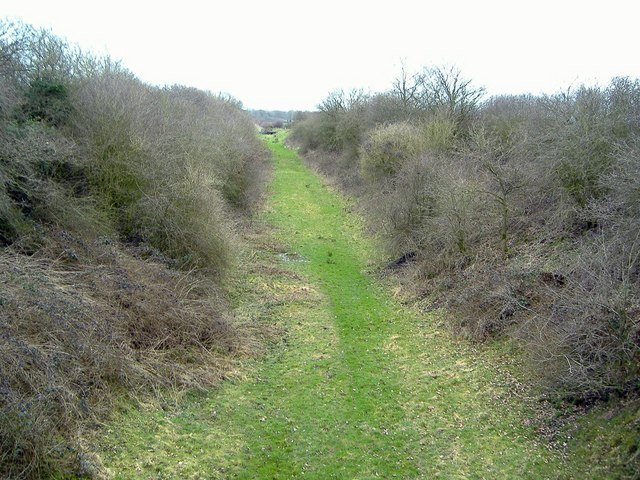
The former permanent way of the Whitchurch and Tattenhall Railway near the village of Tattenhall, Cheshire.

After rumours circulated in 1974 that an attempt might be made to reopen the branch line, the Chester Chronicle pointed out that none of its stations had been well sited or used and any revival rumours were without foundation because the costs would be prohibitive.

In the 1980s, Cheshire County Council had aspirations to convert the line into a country park. The plans were dropped, except for a picnic site at Broxton, when the authority's countryside committee reported that the project had 'very little potential for recreation'.

== Bibliography ==
- Bradshaw, George (1968) [August 1887]. Bradshaw's August 1887 Railway Guide: A Reprint of Bradshaw's General Railway and Steam Navigation Guide for Great Britain and Ireland. Newton Abbot: David and Charles.
- Bradshaw, George (2011) [December 1895]. Bradshaw's Rail Times for Great Britain and Ireland December 1895: A Reprint of the Classic Timetable Complete with Period Advertisements and Shipping Connections to All Parts. Midhurst: Middleton Press. ISBN 978-1-908174-11-6. OCLC 832579861.
- Bradshaw, George (1985) [July 1922]. Bradshaw's General Railway and Steam Navigation guide for Great Britain and Ireland: A reprint of the July 1922 issue. Newton Abbot: David & Charles. ISBN 978-0-7153-8708-5. OCLC 12500436.
- Bradshaw, George (1939). Bradshaw's Guide to the British Railways: October 1939. henry Blacklock.
- Bradshaw, George (1951). Bradshaw's Guide to the British Railways: July 1951 (PDF). henry Blacklock.
- Christiansen, Rex (1983). A Regional History of the Railways of Great Britain. Vol. 7 The West Midlands (2nd ed.). David St John Thomas. ISBN 0-946537-00-3.
- Christiansen, Rex (1988). Forgotten Railways:Severn Valley and Welsh Border. David & Charles. ISBN 0-946537-43-7.
- Greville, M.D. (1981). Chronology of the Railways of Lancashire and Cheshire (Revised and Combined ed.). Railway & Canal Historical Society. ISBN 0-901461-30-X.
- Hitches, Mike (1994). Cheshire Railways in old photographs. Britain in old photographs. Stroud: Alan Sutton. ISBN 0750907568.
- Hurst, Geoffrey (1992). Register of Closed Railways: 1948-1991. Worksop, Nottinghamshire: Milepost Publications. ISBN 0-9477-9618-5.
- Jacobs, Gerald (2009). "Railway Mileages". In Bridge, Mike (ed.). TRACKatlas of Mainland Britain. Bradford on Avon: Trackmaps. ISBN 978-0-9549866-5-0.
- Neele, George P. (2022) [1904]. Railway Reminiscences: Late Superintendent of the line of the London and North Western Railway (Classic reprint ed.). London: Forgotten books. ISBN 978-1-332-03078-1. OCLC 1360265899.
- Quick, Michael (2023) [2001]. Railway passenger stations in Great Britain: a chronology (PDF). version 5.05. Railway & Canal Historical Society.
- Railway Museum (2018). "Royal trains archive list" (PDF). www.railwaymuseum.org.uk.
- Simmons, Jack (1997). "'up' and 'down'". In Simmons, Jack; Biddle, Gordon (eds.). The Oxford Companion to British Railway History From 1603 to the 1990s (1st ed.). Oxford: Oxford University Press. p. 548. ISBN 0-19-211697-5.
- Yate, Bob (2014). The Shrewsbury to Crewe Line. Nottingham: Book Law Publications. ISBN 978-1-909625-33-4.
