= Birkenhead Grange Lane railway station =

Former railway station on the Chester and Birkenhead Railway in Wirral, England

Birkenhead Grange Lane

General information
- Location: Birkenhead, Wirral; England
- Coordinates: 53.3896°N 3.0165°W
- Grid reference: SJ324885
- Platforms: 1

Other information
- Status: Disused

History
- Original company: Chester and Birkenhead Railway

Key dates
- 23 September 1840: Opened
- 23 October 1844: Closed
Location

Birkenhead Grange Lane was a railway station in Birkenhead, England. On opening, the station was the northern terminus of the Chester and Birkenhead Railway. The station was opened in 1840, and closed to passengers in 1844 but the site remained in use for goods until the 1970s.

| Preceding station | Disused railways | Following station |
|---|---|---|
| Bebington; Line and station open | Chester and Birkenhead Railway | Terminus; Line and station closed |
