= Whitchurch railway station (Shropshire) =

Railway station in Shropshire, England

Whitchurch (Shropshire)
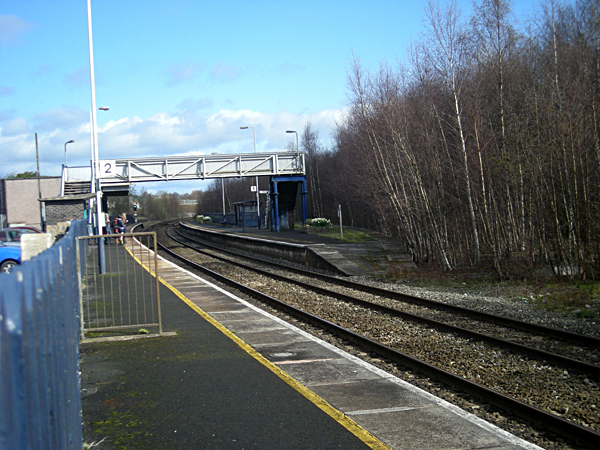
- Whitchurch railway station.

General information
- Location: Whitchurch, Shropshire; England
- Coordinates: 52.9682°N 2.6717°W
- Grid reference: SJ549414
- Managed by: Transport for Wales
- Platforms: 2

Other information
- Station code: WTC
- Classification: DfT category F1

History
- Original company: Crewe and Shrewsbury Railway
- Pre-grouping: London and North Western Railway
- Post-grouping: London, Midland and Scottish Railway

Key dates
- 1 September 1858: Station opened

Passengers
- 2020/21: ▼23,424
- 2021/22: ▲94,134
- 2022/23: ▲116,474
- 2023/24: ▲135,830
- 2024/25: ▲164,476
Location
Notes
- Passenger statistics from the Office of Rail and Road

Whitchurch (Shropshire) railway station serves the town of Whitchurch, in Shropshire, England. The station is 18¾ miles (30 km) north of Shrewsbury on the Welsh Marches Line. It is maintained and served by Transport for Wales.

== History ==
The station opened on 1 September 1858 by the LNWR-backed Crewe and Shrewsbury Railway. It was once the junction for the Cambrian Railways' Oswestry, Ellesmere and Whitchurch Railway line to Oswestry and Welshpool (the former Cambrian mainline to Aberystwyth), and the Whitchurch and Tattenhall Railway. The former was closed as a result of the Beeching Axe in January 1965, whilst the latter was closed to passengers by the British Transport Commission in September 1957 and completely in January 1963.

The site of the former junctions can still be seen from passing trains.

The last major work carried out on Whitchurch station was the replacement of the original railway bridge that had become damaged by an oversized lorry load.

== Layout ==
The station has two platforms and a footbridge. There used to be a large signal box here, which was latterly switched out of use, although operational if required; this was closed and demolished in 2012 whilst the one-time goods shed has been turned into a garage. The former up loop and down bay platforms have both had their track removed (the former is fenced off) and the main buildings (booking hall, waiting room and offices) have also been demolished.

== Facilities ==
The station is unstaffed, although it does have a ticket machine. There are waiting shelters on both platforms. Train running information is offered by means of CIS displays and timetable poster boards. Step-free access is only possible to the northbound platform, as the footbridge is not accessible for disabled passengers.

== Services ==
Transport for Wales operates the following services:

- A local stopping service between Shrewsbury and Crewe; these operate every two hours each way
- Some longer distance trains call here between Manchester Piccadilly and Cardiff Central, with extensions to Carmarthen, Fishguard Harbour and Milford Haven.

Preceding station	National Rail	Following station
Prees	Transport for Wales; Welsh Marches line	Wrenbury
	Historical railways	
Prees; Line and station open	London and North Western Railway; Shrewsbury and Crewe Railway	Wrenbury; Line and station open
	Disused railways	
Malpas; Line and station closed	London and North Western Railway; Whitchurch and Tattenhall Railway	Terminus
Fenn's Bank; Line and station closed	Cambrian Railways; Oswestry, Ellesmere and Whitchurch Railway	Terminus
