= Birkenhead Dock Branch =

Disused rail line in Wirral, England

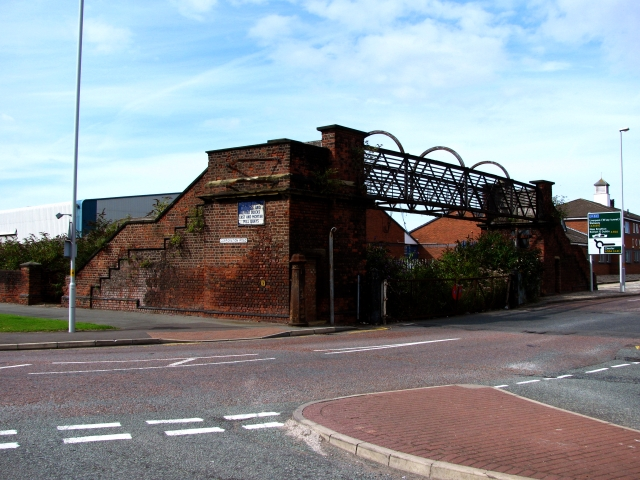
- Former footbridge at Canning Street North (Rendel Street) level crossing, demolished in 2019.

Overview
- Status: Disused
- Owner: Network Rail; Peel Holdings
- Locale: Wirral, Merseyside
- Termini: Rock Ferry; Bidston Dock
- Stations: Rock Ferry; Birkenhead Town

Service
- Type: Heavy rail
- Operator: Network Rail
- Depot: Mollington Street
- Rolling stock: Freight

History
- Opened: 1847
- Closed: 1993

Technical
- Line length: 4.5 mi (7.2 km)
- Number of tracks: 2
- Track gauge: 4 ft 8 1/2 in (1,435 mm) standard gauge

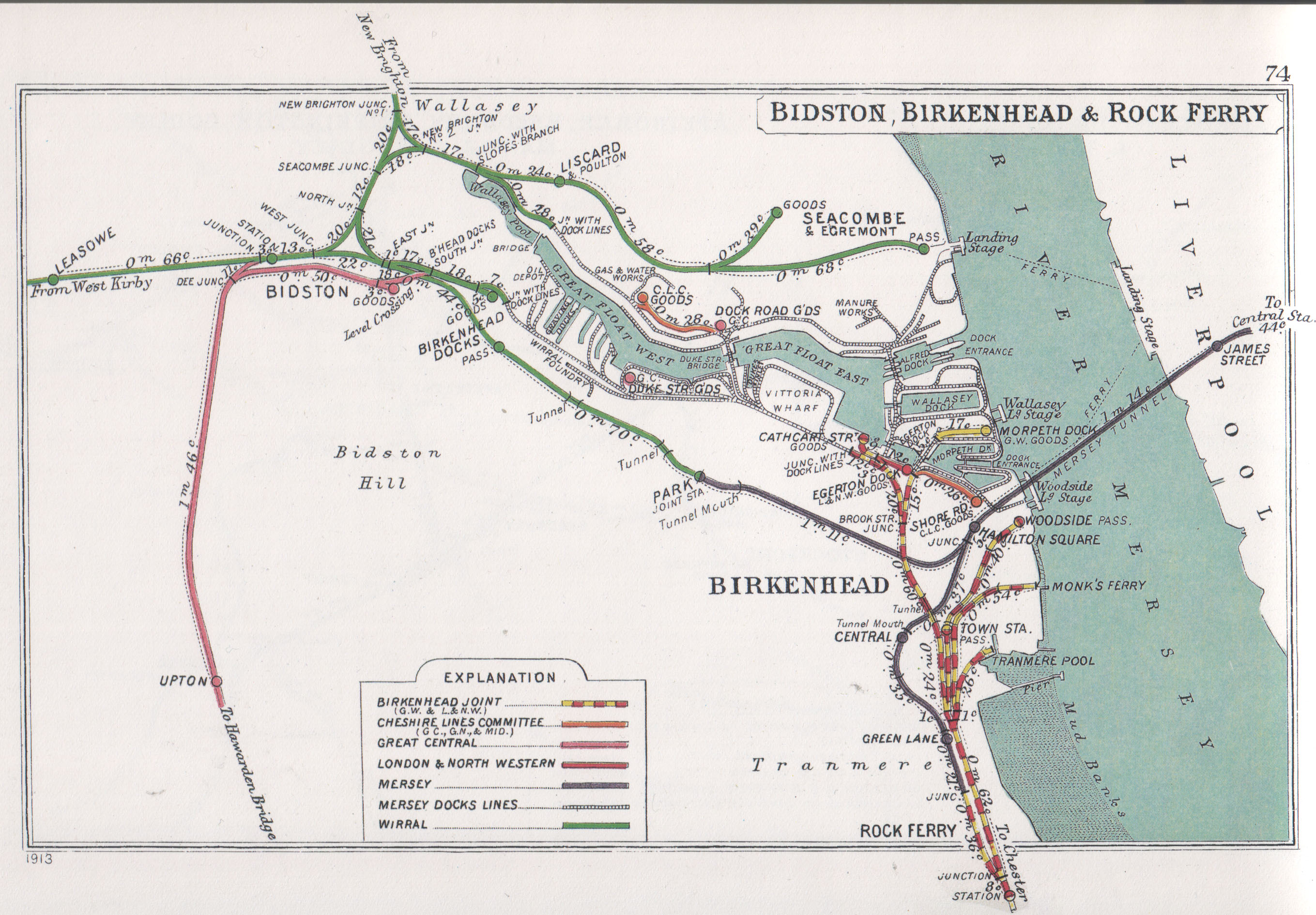
Map of the railways around the Great Float.

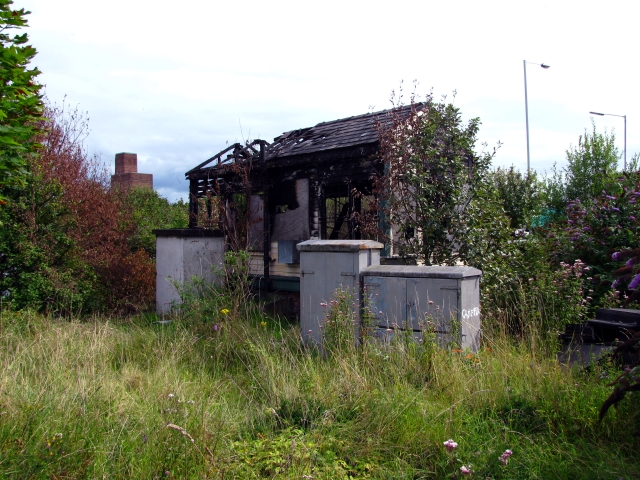
Canning Street North signal box, in 2009.

Birkenhead Dock Branch is a disused railway line running from the South junction of Rock Ferry, to the site of the former Bidston Dock on the Wirral Peninsula, England. The branch is approximately 4 1/2 miles (7.2 km) in length. Although called a branch, the line was accessible from both ends, from Bidston East junction and from Rock Ferry railway station. The former Mollington Street Rail Depot was branched into the line. A section of the line runs through Haymarket Tunnel and a low-level cutting through the centre of Birkenhead; visible from the road flyovers. The former Canning Street North signal box has now been demolished following fire damage, and the rails across the level crossing there have been removed due to the provision of cycle lanes on the roadway. The non-standard gates remain on the east side, but a fence has been erected on the other side despite the railway being officially out of use, rather than closed. Level crossings are also located at Duke Street and Wallasey Bridge Road. The railway lines are still partially intact.

== Goods yards ==
At the northern end of the branch, disused goods yards are situated parallel to Birkenhead North TMD, Wallasey Bridge Road sidings and, adjacent to the Kingsway Tunnel approach road, Bidston Dock sidings. These two sets of sidings are also accessible by rail, through a series of points between Birkenhead North TMD and Bidston station.

Up until the 1980s, goods yards around the docks were much more extensive, with lines along the sides of both East and West Float. Further lines and sidings were along Duke Street, around Vittoria Dock, along Four Bridges Road and Birkenhead Road into Seacombe, and in the area around Wallasey, Egerton and Morpeth Docks.

== History ==
As part of the Chester and Birkenhead Railway, the railway from Rock Ferry to Birkenhead Town is one of the oldest stretches of track in the world. The line was completed and opened on 23 September 1838, less than nine years after the Rainhill Trials, across the River Mersey, on the outskirts of Liverpool. Before Monks Ferry was opened in 1844, the line was originally to a temporary terminus known as Birkenhead Grange Lane station. Grange Lane engine shed was opened on 23 September 1840. The 1.125 mi (1.811 km) section, from Grange Lane to Bridge End near Cathcart Street, was built into a cutting known as the Sough (pronounced "Suff"), opening the same day as Birkenhead Park, on 5 April 1847. The connection with the Great Western Railway at Green Lane Junction was made in 1847.

In 1856-7, the Birkenhead Railway acquired a pair of 0-4-0T saddle tank locomotives, for use around the docks, from Sharp, Stewart. These were renumbered as 95 and 96 by the GWR, after the joint takeover of the railway, with the LNWR, in 1860.

At Bidston, the line was connected to the Great Central Railway in 1896.

=== 20th century ===
Ownership of the railway circa. 1913-1914 was as follows:

- Rock Ferry to Canning Street North was controlled by Birkenhead Joint Railway, whose ownership was shared between the GWR and LNWR.
- The track from Canning Street North to Wallasey Bridge Road was operated by the Mersey Docks and Harbour Board.
- The route from Wallasey Bridge Road, around the remnant of Wallasey Pool, to the site of the as-yet unbuilt Bidston Dock, was operated by the Wirral Railway.

=== British Railways steam era ===
The Class 9F locomotive 92203, later named as Black Prince, worked the final steam-hauled iron ore train from Bidston Dock in November 1967.

=== British Rail diesel era ===
During the BR era, the line was used by various classes of diesel locomotive, primarily for hauling offloaded iron ore from Bidston Dock, to the John Summers Steelworks in Shotton. The John Summers wagons came under the TOPS code of PHO. (Note: By 1988, some of these wagons were in use on Buxton stone trains.) Fully loaded, a train was limited to eleven of these wagons. This work was carried out by engines with a high traction capacity, usually either a Class 40 locomotive, or pairs of Class 24 or Class 25 locomotives. However, pairs of Class 20 diesels were also occasionally used, although very infrequently. This work was ceased in March 1980, when the steelworks at Shotton was closed.

Between 1983 and 1985, Class 503 electric multiple units were stored at Cavendish Sidings, before scrapping. Most of these trains suffered vandalism whilst stationed there.

Amongst the few and final passenger workings on the line was the Birkenhead Bandit railtour, hauled by Class 40 locomotive 40122 D200, on 16 February 1985. Others included the Mersey Meanderer railtour on 19 April 1986, Hertfordshire Rail Tours' Wirral Withershins charter on 18 January 1986 and their Cheshire Cat charter, on 24 June 1989.

Goods workings continued on the line, for traffic to the Spillers Mill on East Float until the late 1980s with grain wagon traffic from Whitemoor Yard. Afterwards, a thrice-weekly coal train operated on the line until 1992.

Some of the last locomotives to have served within the dock complex were Birkenhead North TMD's allocation of Class 03 shunters, 03073, 03162, 03170 and 03189 all of which have been preserved. Indeed, the railways around the docks saw the last mainland use of the class by British Rail, before their withdrawal in March 1989. The last traffic along the line, from Birkenhead North to Rock Ferry, was a Class 08 shunter on 10 May 1993. Subsequently, the line was mothballed by Railtrack. However, the trackwork remains in place and various other railway artefacts are still in existence.

The line has been used on only two occasions since 1993, both a day apart. In January 2008, an EWS Class 66 diesel entered the line at Rock Ferry station.

=== Rea Bulk Handling locomotives ===
The Rea Bulk Handling Company had a small fleet of nine Drewry 0-4-0DM and 0-6-0DM diesel shunters, which operated on the dock lines. The names of these locomotives included; Theseus, Wabana, Kathleen Nicholls, Pegasus, WH Salthouse, (Note: W.H. Salthouse was one of Rea Ltd.'s senior engineers.) Dorothy Lightfoot, Narvik, Teucer and Pepel. A further 0-4-0DE locomotive built by the Yorkshire Engine Company, named Labrador, and of similar design to a Class 02, also worked around the Bidston Dock area. After the end of the iron ore traffic through Bidston Dock, Rea Ltd. ceased its railway activity around the docks and the remaining shunting duties were taken over by Class 03s.

== 21st century ==
The former Railtrack has, in the past, indicated an interest in seeing the line reopened for goods services.

The Peel Group, who are behind the multibillion-pound Wirral Waters redevelopment of the docks, announced in February 2013 that they intended on using the abandoned route to run a tram system, known as the Wirral Street Car. The plan involved connecting Wirral Waters to the Merseyrail network at Birkenhead North and Hamilton Square stations, utilising the stretch of dock branch trackbed along Beaufort Road and Corporation Road, with inner and outer loops around Vittoria Dock and East Float, respectively. Options to connect this new system to Conway Park and Birkenhead Park stations are also available.

In 2021, it was proposed to fill in parts of the branch to create a park with a walking and cycling route. Construction of the new £13 million park began in May 2022, which will link Rock Ferry with Bidston Dock. Known as Dock Branch Park, it will provide a mile–long pedestrian and cycle corridor between the two locations, as well as providing land for 1,000 homes a new venue for Wirral Transport Museum.

== See also ==
- Birkenhead Railway
- Dock Branch Park
