= Wirral Street Car =

Proposed tramway in Wirral, England

- Map of the proposed route.

Operation
- Locale: Wirral
- Open: TBD
- Lines: One
- Routes: Bidston Dock to Woodside Ferry Terminal
- Owners: Wirral Waters, Wirral Council and Merseyrail (project partners)

Infrastructure
- Track gauge: Standard

Statistics
- Website: https://www.wirralwaters.co.uk/projects/wirral-street-car/ Wirral Street Car

The Wirral Street Car is a proposed tramway from Bidston Dock to Woodside Ferry Terminal to provide transport links for the Wirral Waters development. The line will use pre-existing rolling stock as well as incorporating both the disused Birkenhead Dock Branch and the Wirral Tramway that already operates as a heritage service from the Wirral Transport Museum to Woodside Ferry Terminal.

== History ==
Plans for the Street Car were first announced in February 2013, intending to redevelop part of the abandoned Birkenhead Dock Branch route into a tram system. The plans involved connecting Wirral Waters to the Merseyrail network at the Birkenhead North and Hamilton Square stations, utilising the stretch of dock branch trackbed along Beaufort Road and Corporation Road, with inner and outer loops around Vittoria Dock and East Float, respectively. Options to connect this new system to Conway Park and Birkenhead Park stations are also available, along with a further extension for the Wirral Tramway to Seacombe ferry terminal.

In November 2018, the details of a consultation by Wirral Council & Peel Land and Property called the 'Streetscape Project' were announced. The consultation is not directly focused on the tramway but the concept of a tram service is featured heavily, with the consultation suggesting that the scheme could be completed "over the next five years."
