= Wallasey Pool =

Former tidal inlet on Wirral Peninsula, England

Coordinates: 53.40320°N 3.03780°W

Wallasey Pool was a natural tidal inlet of water that separated the towns of Wallasey and Birkenhead on the Wirral Peninsula, England. Originally flowing directly into the River Mersey, it was converted into the sophisticated Birkenhead Dock system from the 1820s onwards by land reclamation, with the main portion of the pool becoming known as the Great Float. In 1933, with the exception of a small lake, the head of Wallasey Pool at Poulton was converted into Bidston Dock. By 2003, this dock had been filled in.

== Redevelopment ==
A new development was approved for Birkenhead docks in 2010. The Wirral Waters development will transform the docklands area into business, leisure and retail facilities.

== Bridges ==
Four road bridges cross the former Wallasey Pool, over what is now Birkenhead Docks:

Egerton Bridge is situated between Egerton Dock and Morpeth Dock and is a bascule bridge. It was built between 1928 and 1931, replacing an earlier hydraulic swing bridge. The bridge and the machine house were completely restored in 1993 and opened to the public in 1995.

A red girdered bascule bridge at Tower Road connects the Seacombe district of Wallasey with Birkenhead. Known as the Four Bridges, as originally four movable bridges existed along Tower Road: two between the Great Float and Alfred Dock, one between the Great Float and Wallasey Dock and one between the Great Float and Egerton Dock. When originally built, all four were hydraulic swing bridge types. In the 1930s most were replaced by bascule bridges.

Joining the southern end of the Poulton district of Wallasey with the north end of Birkenhead, Duke Street bridge is also a bascule (see-saw) bridge but with painted green girders. Originally, it was also a swing bridge.

Furthest upstream is the Penny Bridge, which crosses the head of the pool to connect Poulton with Bidston in Birkenhead. Replacing an earlier wooden bridge of 1843, the name derives from the 1896 one penny toll to cross in one direction. The bridge was replaced again in 1926 and provided access to Bidston Dock. The dock itself has been filled in and the bridge was replaced by a fixed roadway in 1996.

== Bidston Moss ==
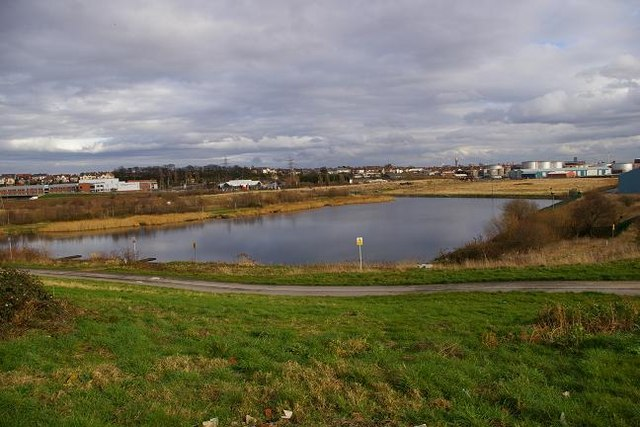
The fishing lake at Bidston Moss.

Bidston Moss was originally low-lying wetland marsh at the head of Wallasey Pool. In 1936 most of the land was given over to residential, commercial and industrial landfill. Since the cessation of waste disposal operations in 1995, Merseyside Waste Disposal Authority and the charitable trust Groundwork Wirral have undertaken environmental restoration works to landscape the site. The site is now known as the Newlands Project Nature Reserve, is 68 hectares (170 acres) in size, with a fishing lake and a 2 kilometres (1.2 mi) of cycling trail. The site is also accessible, to the public, from Cross Lane and the Wallacre in Wallasey. The nearest car park is at Bidston station.

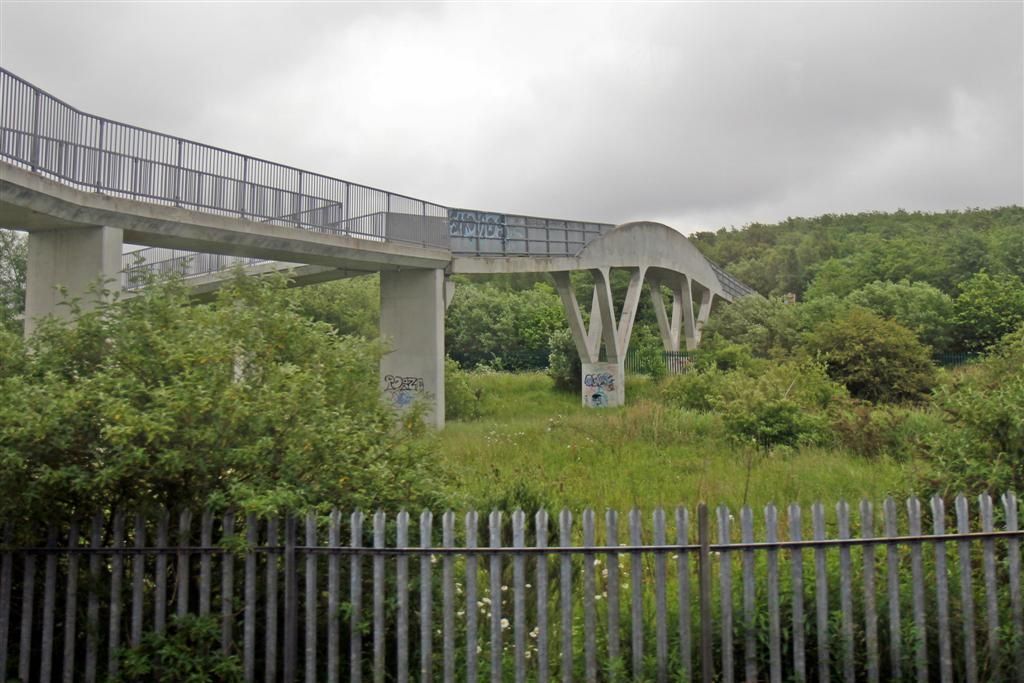
The footbridge into the nature reserve, from Wallasey.
