= 1909 in the United Kingdom =

Events from the year 1909 in the United Kingdom.

== Incumbents ==
- Monarch – Edward VII
- Prime Minister – H. H. Asquith (Liberal)

== Events ==
- 1 January – the first pensions are paid out under terms of the Old Age Pensions Act 1908, which provides for a non-contributory weekly sum of 5 shillings to be paid through post offices to people aged over seventy with a weekly income under 12 shillings but of 'good character'. Around 490,000 people are granted the pension during its first year.
- 9 January – Ernest Shackleton's Nimrod Expedition to the South Pole forced to turn back 112 miles from the pole.
- 23 January – the Tottenham Outrage, an armed robbery and the murder of a ten-year-old boy and a police constable in Tottenham, North London, carried out by two Latvian anarchists.
- 16 February – West Stanley Pit Disaster, a coal mining disaster in Stanley, County Durham, in which more than 160 miners are killed in an explosion.
- 22 February – Thomas Beecham conducts the first concert with his newly established Beecham Symphony Orchestra.
- 26 February – first film shown in colour using Kinemacolor at the Palace Theatre, London.
- March – construction of the Rosyth Dockyard for the Royal Navy on the east coast of Scotland begins.
- 6 March – Birkenhead dock disaster: a temporary cofferdam collapses during construction of Vittoria Dock, killing 14 navvies.
- 10 March – Anglo-Siamese Treaty signed in Bangkok.
- 15 March – Selfridges department store opens in London.
- 16 March – Port of London Authority established.
- 11 April – coming into effect of Children Act 1908 (8 Edw. 7. c. 67), establishing separate juvenile courts for 10–16-year-olds; abolishing the use of custody for under-fourteens and hanging for under-sixteens; introducing the registration of foster parents; and restricting access for under-16s to cigarettes and alcohol.
- 24 April – the FA Cup final is won by Manchester United for the first time, as they beat Bristol City 1–0 at Crystal Palace.
- 29 April – People's Budget introduced in the British Parliament by David Lloyd George.
- 2 May – John Moore-Brabazon becomes the first resident British citizen to make a recognised powered heavier-than-air flight in the UK, flying from The Aero Club's ground at Leysdown on the Isle of Sheppey in his Voisin biplane Bird of Passage.
- 13 May – Lonmin is incorporated in the UK as the London and Rhodesian Mining and Land Company Limited.
- 26 May – the King's horse, Minoru, wins the Epsom Derby.
- 15 June – representatives from England, Australia and South Africa meet at Lord's and form the Imperial Cricket Conference.
- 25 June – Herbert Samuel, is appointed Chancellor of the Duchy of Lancaster, making him the first practising Jew to serve as a member of the Cabinet.
- 26 June – Edward VII and Queen Alexandra open the Victoria and Albert Museum in London, designed by Aston Webb. The Science Museum, London, comes into existence as an independent entity.
- 27 June – Eric Gordon England flies a Weiss glider at Amberley, West Sussex, in the first recorded soaring flight, origin of sport gliding.
- July – Ivy Evelyn Woodward is admitted as the first woman Member of the Royal College of Physicians.
- 1 July – The British Indian army officer and politician Curzon Wyllie is shot dead at the Imperial Institute in South Kensington, London, and a bystander fatally wounded; the assassin, Madan Lal Dhingra, an Indian nationalist student, is subsequently sentenced to death and hanged at Pentonville Prison on 17 August.
- 25 July – Louis Blériot flies a Blériot XI monoplane across the English Channel from Calais to Dover, winning a prize of £1000 from the Daily Mail.
- 23 August – the Secret Service Bureau counter-espionage unit (later known as MI5) is secretly established.
- 3 September – the first Boy Scout rally held at The Crystal Palace in London.
- 17 September – militant suffragette Mabel Capper is among the first to suffer force-feeding while on hunger strike, at Winson Green Prison in Birmingham.
- 20 September – Labour Exchanges Act leads to setting up of labour exchanges as a source of information on employment.
- 2 October – the first match is played at the Rugby Football Union's Twickenham Stadium in Middlesex, Harlequins v. Richmond.
- 15–23 October – "Aviation week" of demonstration flying held at Doncaster; this is followed by a similar event at Blackpool.
- 20 October – the Trade Boards Act, a form of minimum wage legislation, is passed.
- 5 November – the first Woolworth's branch in the UK opens in Liverpool.
- 8 November – first contest for a Lonsdale Belt in boxing, won by Welsh lightweight Freddie Welsh in London.
- 30 November – the House of Lords rejects the People's Budget proposed by David Lloyd George, forcing a general election.
- 3 December – the SS Ellan Vannin sinks in Liverpool Bay resulting in the loss of all 15 passengers and 21 crew.
- 4 December – the University of Bristol is founded and receives its Royal Charter.
- 7 December – South Africa granted dominion status.
- Undated – First British bird ringing programme initiated by Arthur Landsborough Thomson at Aberdeen.

== Publications ==
- Florence Barclay's novel The Rosary.
- Angela Brazil's schoolgirl story The Nicest Girl in the School.
- Daniel Jones' introductory The Pronunciation of English.
- H. G. Wells' novels Ann Veronica and Tono-Bungay.

== Births ==
- 24 January – Martin Lings, Islamic scholar (died 2005)
- 26 January – Alexander King, chemist (died 2007)
- 28 January – Geoff Charles, photojournalist (died 2002)
- 29 January
  - Phoebe Hesketh, poet (died 2005)
  - George Thomas, 1st Viscount Tonypandy, politician, speaker of the House of Commons (died 1997)
- 9 February
  - Marjorie Ogilvie Anderson, historian (died 2002)
  - Heather Angel, actress (died 1986)
- 10 February – Irene Calvert, politician and economist (died 2000)
- 24 February – Ethel MacDonald, activist (died 1960)
- 28 February – Stephen Spender, poet (died 1995)
- 14 March – W. Montgomery Watt, Anglican priest and professor (died 2006)
- 26 March – Martin Hodgson, rugby league footballer (died 1991)
- 3 April - Graham Stuart Thomas, horticulturist (died 2003)
- 6 April - Katherine Russell, social worker and university teacher (died 1998)
- 7 April – Robert Raglan, actor (died 1985)
- 26 April – Rodney Collin, writer (died 1956)
- 30 April – F. E. McWilliam, sculptor (died 1992)
- 5 May – Sonia Dresdel, actress (died 1976)
- 11 May – Herbert Murrill, organist and composer (died 1952)
- 15 May – James Mason, actor (died 1984)
- 16 May – Charles Wilson, political scientist (died 2002)
- 18 May – Fred Perry, tennis player (died 1995)
- 19 May – Nicholas Winton, humanitarian (died 2015)
- 26 May – Matt Busby, football manager (Manchester United) (died 1994)
- 31 May – John Spencer Churchill, painter, sculptor and stockbroker (died 1992)
- 5 June – Marion Crawford, educator, governess to Princess Margaret and Princess Elizabeth (later Queen Elizabeth II) (died 1988)
- 7 June – Jessica Tandy, actress (died 1994)
- 12 June – Tom Steele, Scottish-born American actor and stuntman (died 1990)
- 18 June – Christabel Bielenberg, writer (died 2003)
- 28 June – Eric Ambler, novelist and playwright (died 1998)
- 3 July – Sylvia Gray, businessperson (died 1991)
- 4 July – Robert Manuel Cook, classical scholar (died 2000)
- 5 July – Douglas Dodds-Parker, soldier and politician (died 2006)
- 7 July – Richard Turnbull, colonial governor (died 1998)
- 10 July – Donald Sinclair, naval officer and hotel owner, inspiration for Fawlty Towers (died 1981)
- 16 July – Bernard Gadney, English rugby union player (died 2000)
- 19 July – Percy Stallard, cyclist (died 2001)
- 28 July
  - Malcolm Lowry, novelist (died 1957)
  - Brenda de Banzie, actress (died 1981)
- 30 July – C. Northcote Parkinson, historian and author (died 1993)
- 13 August – Brian Lawrance, Australian-born bandleader (died 1983)
- 21 August – Ethel Caterham, supercentenarian, oldest ever British person
- 25 August – Michael Rennie, actor (died 1971)
- 28 August – Ralph Kilner Brown, athlete, politician and judge (died 2003)
- 9 September
  - Noel Barber, novelist and journalist (died 1988)
  - Setsuko, Princess Chichibu, née Matsudaira, Japanese princess consort (died 1995)
- 12 September – Chili Bouchier, actress (died 1999)
- 14 September – Peter Scott, ornithologist and painter (died 1989)
- 23 September
  - Molly Harrison, museum curator (died 2002)
  - Susan Travers, World War II nurse (died 2003)
- 6 October – Robert Potter, architect (died 2010)
- 24 October – Elwyn Jones, Baron Elwyn-Jones, barrister and politician, Lord Chancellor (died 1989)
- 28 October – Francis Bacon, painter (died 1992)
- 6 November – Elizabeth Douglas-Home, spouse of the prime minister (died 1990)
- 8 November – Eric Bedford, architect (died 2001)
- 17 November – E. S. Turner, author and journalist (died 2006)
- 19 November – Griffith Jones, actor (died 2007)
- 23 November – Nigel Tranter, historian and writer (died 2000)
- 30 November – Nancy Carline, artist (died 2004)
- 1 December – Frank Gillard, radio broadcaster (died 1998)
- 4 December
  - Edward Britton, trade unionist (died 2005)
  - Jimmy Jewel, comedian and actor (died 1995)
- 8 December – Lesslie Newbigin, bishop and theologian (died 1998)
- 10 December – F. W. Walbank, scholar of Greek history (died 2008)
- 15 December – Jack Gwillim, actor (died 2001)
- 22 December – Patricia Hayes, character actress (died 1998)
- 23 December
  - Donald Coggan, Archbishop of Canterbury (died 2000)
  - Maurice Denham, actor (died 2002)
- 27 December – Neal Arden, actor (died 2014)

== Deaths ==
- 8 January – Harry Seeley, palaeontologist (born 1839)
- 14 January – Arthur William à Beckett, journalist (born 1844)
- 24 February – Fanny Cornforth, artists' model (born 1835)
- 1 April – Sir Marshal Clarke, Anglo-Irish colonial administrator (born 1841)
- 10 April – Algernon Charles Swinburne, poet (born 1837)
- 13 April – Sir Donald Currie, Scottish shipping magnate (born 1825)
- 12 May – Sir Hugh Gough, general, Victoria Cross recipient (born 1833 in British India)
- 18 May – George Meredith, novelist and poet (born 1828)
- 31 May – Thomas Price, Welsh-born Prime Minister of South Australia (born 1852)
- 10 June – Aylmer Cameron, Scottish army officer, VC recipient (born 1833)
- 22 June – Edward John Gregory, painter (born 1850)
- 1 July – Curzon Wyllie, soldier and politician (murdered) (born 1848)
- 9 July
  - George Robinson, 1st Marquess of Ripon, politician (born 1827)
  - Rosa Nouchette Carey, children's writer (born 1840)
- 1 August – Sir Hugh Rowlands, Welsh general, first Welsh Victoria Cross recipient (born 1828)
- 14 August – William Stanley, inventor, precision engineer (born 1829)
- 22 August – Henry Radcliffe Crocker, dermatologist (born 1846)
- 25 October – Arthur Bromley, British Royal Navy officer, Admiral Superintendent of Malta Dockyard (born 1847)
- 9 November – William Powell Frith, painter (born 1819)
- 10 November – George Essex Evans, Welsh-Australian poet (born 1863)
- 11 December – Ludwig Mond, industrialist (born 1839)
- 13 December – Sir Alfred Lewis Jones, shipping magnate (born 1845)

== See also ==
- List of British films before 1920
