= Wirral Waters =

Development project in Wirral, England

- Wirral Waters logo

Project
- Developer: The Peel Group
- Website: WirralWaters.co.uk

Physical features
- Divisions: East Float, Vittoria Dock, Bidston Dock

Location
- Interactive map of Wirral Waters
- Coordinates: 53.3846°N 3.0109°W
- Country: England
- County: Merseyside
- Town: Birkenhead

Wirral Waters is a large scale £4.5bn development currently being built by the Peel Group for Birkenhead, on the Wirral Peninsula, England. It is the sister programme of the Liverpool Waters project. Since 2012, the two projects have enjoyed enterprise zone status, together forming the Mersey Waters Enterprise Zone.

== Design ==
The original plans intended for the creation of 5,000,000 square feet (465,000 m^{2}) of modern office space at the East Float and Vittoria Dock. A central part of the early designs were the creation of a series of towers that were to provide space for a waterfront hotel, bars, restaurants, other leisure facilities and 15,000 apartments. Three of the towers were intended to achieve fifty storeys. One of the landmark developments in the scheme was to be the creation of a £175m 'International Trade Centre. This facility was to allow companies from countries in Asia to exhibit and sell their goods and services into Europe.

Further development was proposed at the site of the former Bidston Dock, close to the M53 motorway and the Kingsway road tunnel to Liverpool. This was to encompass an additional 571,000 square feet (53,000 m^{2}) of retail and leisure facilities.

The architectural practice Broadway Malyan were employed by Peel to be responsible for the overall design of the development. It was estimated by the developers that the scheme may lead to the creation of over 27,000 permanent jobs.

A plan was announced in February 2013, intending to redevelop part of the abandoned Birkenhead Dock Branch route, to run a streetcar system, to be known as Wirral Street Car. The plan involves connecting Wirral Waters to the Merseyrail network at Birkenhead North and Hamilton Square stations, utilising the stretch of dock branch trackbed along Beaufort Road and Corporation Road, with inner and outer loops around Vittoria Dock and East Float, respectively. Options to connect this new system to Conway Park and Birkenhead Park stations are also available, along with a further extension for the Wirral Tramway to Seacombe ferry terminal.

== History ==
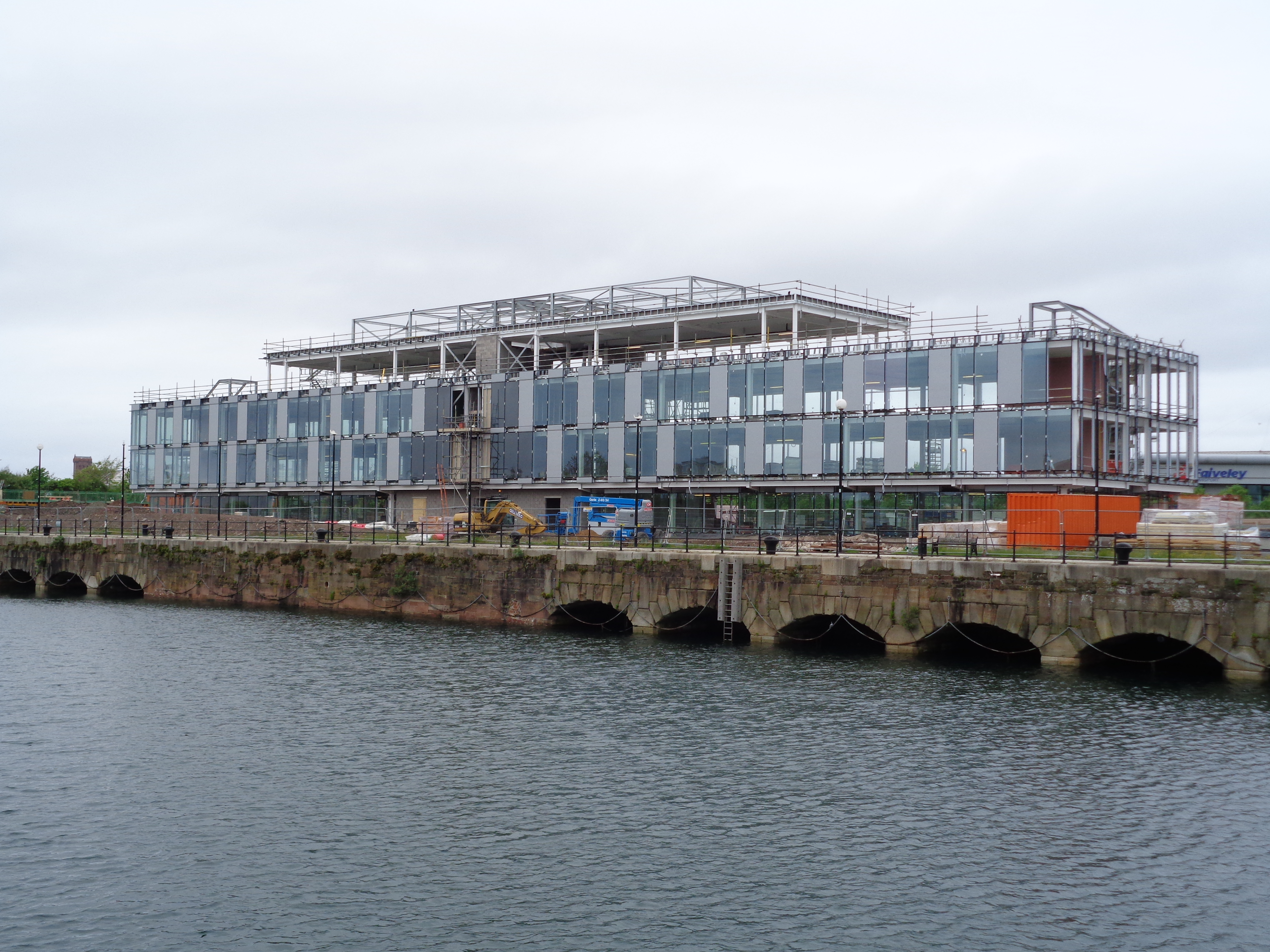
The Tower Wharf redevelopment, adjacent to Egerton Dock in May 2015.

The scheme was revealed to the public in September 2006, after 18 months of design, whilst at a consultative stage. Local councillors welcomed the proposals.

Peel intended to submit proposals to the Wirral Council by Christmas 2008, however, this process took longer and it was not until the second half of 2010 that approval was given by Wirral Council's Planning Committee and, later on, the government.

On 6 January 2011, Prime Minister David Cameron together with Lord Heseltine met with members of Wirral Metropolitan Borough Council who were given a presentation of the scheme, followed by a tour of the site. Plans were submitted that year for the International Trade Centre, with the project to take place with Chinese investors.

In April 2014, Wirral Metropolitan College announced plans for a new campus for building and construction. The new facility opened in September 2015. Plans were submitted for a 60,000 square feet (5,600 m^{2}) office building at Tower Wharf, in May 2014. The building was completed in 2015 and became the new headquarters of a call centre.

In June 2015, Peel announced it was pulling out of its joint venture with proposed Chinese partner Sam Wa for the development of the cornerstone International Trade Centre.

It was announced in November 2016 that Wirral Waters had been made one of six new 'Housing Zones' and could apply for a share of £18 million of government funding designed to speed up the construction of large scale housing developments.

Plans for a £25 million maritime training and business hub were announced in 2018. The hub will be located in the old Victorian Central Hydraulic Tower situated by Alfred Dock within the development. Planning permission was raised by Peel in June 2022, with work hoping to be started in mid-2023.

At the 2018 MPIM Global Property Expo in Cannes, three schemes to develop over 1,000 homes were announced. The schemes consist of a 'dementia care village', 347 modular homes and 500 apartments. The development, known as 'Miller's Quay', will consist of 500 apartments started work in the summer of 2022.

A-grade office space was completed in 2021 with the opening of the Hythe Building. The first tenant, a modular housing provider, moved into the facility in 2022.

== See also ==
- Mersey Barrage
