= Scantec =

Scantec Personnel is a recruitment agency in the UK, and is now ranked 9th within the Top 20 UK Technical Recruitment Agencies.

Founded in 1990, in 2007 Scantec relocated to a larger office in Twelve Quays, Wirral.

== History ==
Launched in 1990, Scantec originally focused on recruitment within the petrochemical, mechanical, pharmaceutical and civil industries, carrying out recruitment for Unilever and Quest International.

In 1995 the company won a five-year contract with the Atomic Weapons Establishment, and since then Scantec has also expanded into oil and gas, scientific, architectural and construction sectors.

== Management ==
John Robinson and Peter Bates directed Scantec, during business’ inception in 1990. As of 2026, only Peter Bates still works as director of the company.
