= Wallasey Dock =

Former dock in Wirral, England

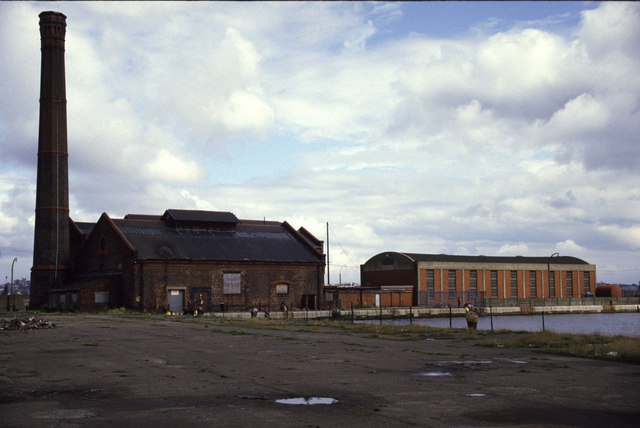
- Wallasey Dock Impounding Station

Location
- Location: Birkenhead, United Kingdom
- Coordinates: 53°24′06″N 3°01′04″W
- OS grid: SJ322898

Details
- Owner: Peel Holdings
- Opened: 1877
- Joins: East Float (former)

The Wallasey Dock, was a dock at Birkenhead, Wirral Peninsula, England. The dock was accessed via East Float to the west, until Wallasey Dock was filled at the turn of the millennium.

== History ==
Construction began in 1874 and the dock opened in 1877, replacing the Great Low Water Basin of 1863, which had opened directly onto the River Mersey to the east. Situated between Alfred Dock to the north and Morpeth Dock to the south, access to the river was westwards through East Float.

The dock sheds were used for grain storage and then for imported livestock. In 1890, a pumping station was installed on the river wall adjoining the dock. This slowly silted the dock, and by the 1960s the dock had silted up, leaving the dock derelict by 1992.

In 2001, Wallasey Dock was filled to provide space for a vehicle park at the new Twelve Quays roll on-roll off ferry terminal nearby.
