= Morpeth Dock Goods railway station =

Former goods terminus on the Birkenhead Docks railway in Wirral, England

Morpeth Dock Goods

General information
- Location: Birkenhead, Wirral; England
- Coordinates: 53.4005°N 3.0145°W
- Grid reference: SJ325898

Other information
- Status: Disused

History
- Original company: LNWR/GWR joint
- Pre-grouping: LNWR/GWR joint
- Post-grouping: LMS/GWR joint

Key dates
- 1868-69: Opened
- 1929-30: Rebuilt
- 9 October 1972: Closed
Location

Morpeth Dock Goods was a goods terminus in Birkenhead, England. The station was situated adjacent to Morpeth Dock, on the Birkenhead Dock Branch railway line. The station was opened in 1868–69, and closed in 1972.

Preceding station	Disused railways	Following station
Rock Ferry	Birkenhead Railway; Birkenhead Dock Branch	Terminus
