= Twelve Quays =

Ferry terminal and business park in Wirral, England

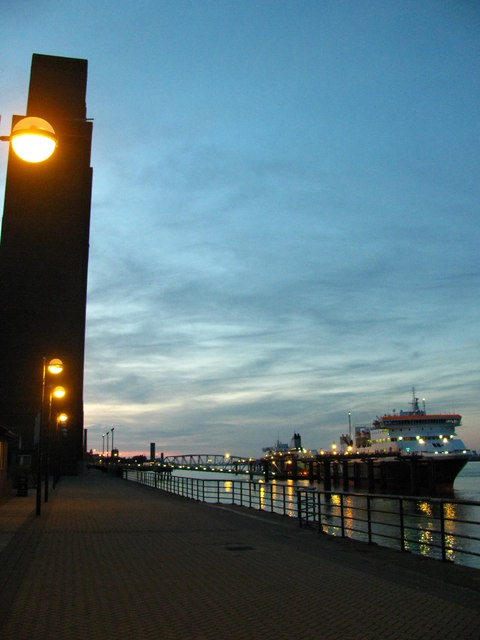
- The Twelve Quays ferry terminal at dusk, seen from Woodside

Location
- Location: Birkenhead, United Kingdom
- Coordinates: 53.40136°N 3.01732°W

Details
- Owner: Mersey Docks and Harbour Company
- Opened: 2002

Twelve Quays is a ferry terminal and business park which is located between East Float and the River Mersey at Birkenhead, in England. Twelve Quays separates Woodside from Seacombe.

== History ==
Twelve Quays is named from the quaysides which served the adjoining Morpeth Dock, Egerton Dock, Alfred Dock, Wallasey Dock and East Float, as well as quaysides on the River Mersey. Wallasey Dock was infilled in 2001, to expand the land area of the site. The area was an artificial island, until the infilling of the Morpeth Dock entrance. Twelve Quays includes the former Wallasey Dock Impounding Station, and the Central Hydraulic Tower. Several bridges connect Twelve Quays to Birkenhead and Seacombe, two of these being along Tower Road and one at the entrance to Egerton Dock. Another of the bridges along Tower Road was removed, when the East Float entrance to Egerton Dock was infilled.

== Ferry terminal ==
The ferry terminal was opened in Summer 2002 at a cost of £25m. It is used for transporting passengers and freight between Merseyside and Belfast, in Northern Ireland and freight to Dublin. Until 2023, it also served passengers to Dublin, in the Republic of Ireland. Owned by Mersey Docks and Harbour Company, the terminal replaced facilities at Brocklebank and Canada docks at Liverpool & reduces voyage times between Liverpool and Ireland by 90 minutes.

Twelve Quays has a floating landing stage in the river that can take two ro-ro ferries at the same time. The terminal provides vehicle parking space on the site of the former Wallasey Dock.

=== Bus link to Hamilton Square railway station ===
A courtesy bus operates from the terminal to a stop outside Birkenhead Hamilton Square railway station (and vice versa) in connection with Stena Line ferry sailings to and from Belfast. Through ticketing is available.
