= HMS Bronington =

Former British Royal Navy minesweeper, currently laid up in Birkenhead, England

Coordinates: 53°24′11.4″N 3°02′46.7″W

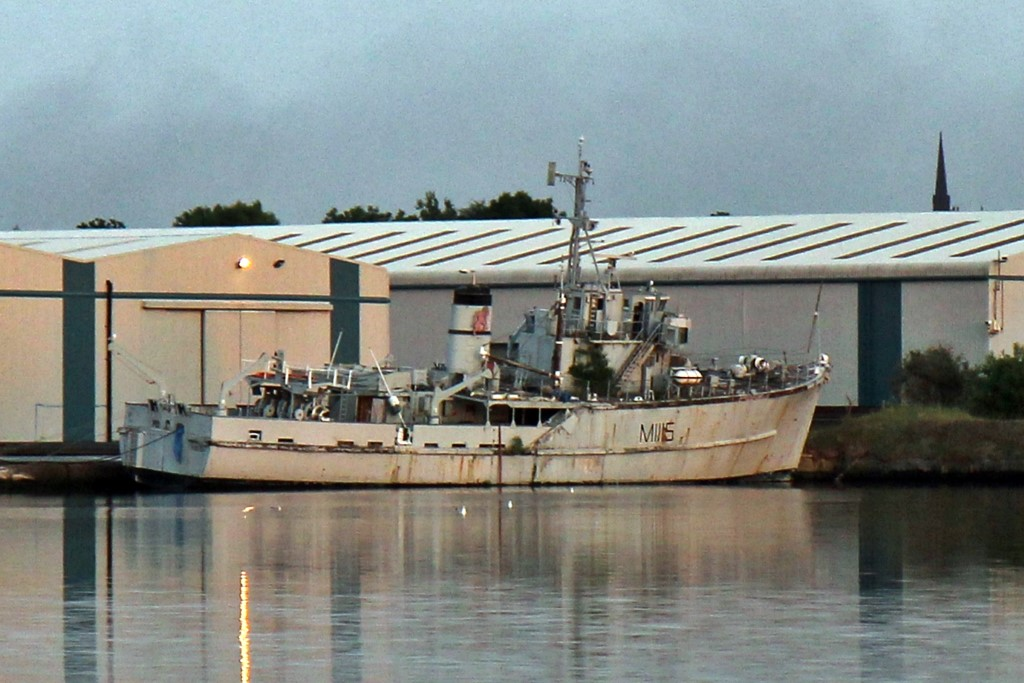
- HMS Bronington laid up at Birkenhead in June 2015

History

United Kingdom
- Name: HMS Bronington
- Namesake: Bronington, Wales
- Builder: Cook, Welton & Gemmell, Beverley
- Laid down: 30 May 1951
- Launched: 19 March 1953
- Commissioned: 4 June 1954
- Decommissioned: 30 June 1988
- Identification: Pennant number: M1115
- Fate: Sunk at her moorings in March 2016. Still partially sunk.
- Badge

General characteristics
- Class & type: Ton-class minesweeper
- Displacement: 440 long tons (450 t)
- Length: 153 ft (46.6 m)
- Beam: 28.9 ft (8.8 m)
- Draught: 8.2 ft (2.5 m)
- Propulsion: 2 × Paxman Deltic 18A-7A diesel engines at 3,000 bhp (2,200 kW)
- Speed: Cruise 13 knots (24 km/h) on one engine. Max 16 knots (30 km/h) on both
- Range: 2,500 nautical miles (4,600 km) at 12 knots (22 km/h)
- Complement: 32
- Armament: 1 x Bofors 40 mm gun

HMS Bronington is a former Ton-class minesweeper of the Royal Navy, named HMS Humber between 1954 and 1958. This mahogany-hulled minesweeper was one of the last of the wooden-hulled naval vessels. Decommissioned in 1988, she was subsequently a museum ship, but sank at Birkenhead in 2016.

== History ==
Bronington was laid down on 30 May 1951 by Cook, Welton & Gemmell at Beverley, Yorkshire. Built on the River Hull, she was launched on 19 March 1953 and was commissioned as HMS Humber on 4 June 1954. Humber spent four years in the Royal Naval Volunteer Reserve, serving as part of the 101st Minesweeping Squadron.

Reverting to her original name in 1958, the vessel was converted into a minehunter at Rosyth Dockyard between 1963 and 1965, and was commissioned to, initially, the 5th Minesweeper Squadron, and then the 1st Mine Countermeasures Squadron on 5 January 1967.

Charles III commanded the vessel between 9 February and 15 December 1976. Subsequently, under the command of his successor, Lieutenant A. B. Gough, Bronington ran aground in the River Avon while departing from Bristol.

During the late 1980s, the vessel saw service in the Mediterranean Sea as part of 2nd Mine Counter Measures Squadron, with NATO as part of the Standing Naval Force Channel and also as a fishery protection vessel.

After being decommissioned from service, the ship was purchased in January 1989 by the Bronington Trust, a registered charity whose patron is the King. For some time, the ship was berthed in the Manchester Ship Canal at Trafford Park and was open to visitors for ten years. On 11 July 2002, she became part of the collection of the Warship Preservation Trust and was moored at Birkenhead, Merseyside. After the closure of the Warship Preservation Trust, she remained in storage, formerly alongside the Rothesay-class frigate HMS Plymouth at Vittoria Dock, and latterly in the West Float of Birkenhead Docks.

On 17 March 2016, Bronington sank at her moorings.

== Preservation ==
In December 2021 the HMS Bronington Preservation Trust was formed with the aim of raising and preserving the vessel.

As of 2023, the ship is still partially submerged. The preservation trust commissioned a dive survey in June 2022 to establish the state of the vessel. The survey revealed the vessel to be in good condition, with only two minor holes in the hull. Subject to fund raising, the trust hopes to move the vessel to a dry dock at Cammell Laird where she will be restored, either for sailing or for use as a static museum exhibit. In June 2023, the National Museum of the Royal Navy said that there are potential locations in Portsmouth Historic Dockyard, which could be considered if the restoration effort is successful. There were efforts to save Bronington in March 2026; it was to be restored for £20,000.
