= Central Hydraulic Tower =

Disused hydraulic engine house in Birkenhead, England

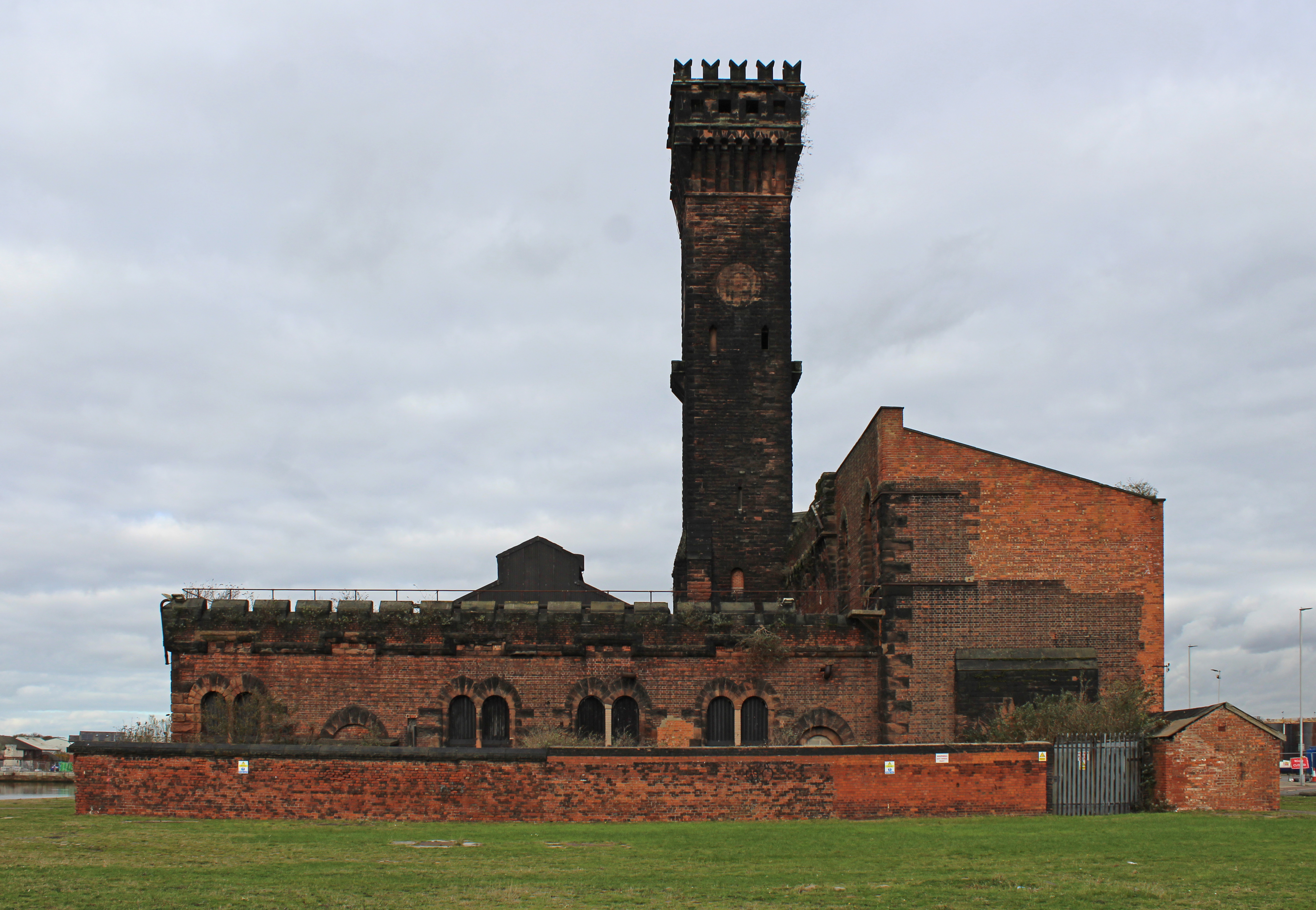
- The Hydraulic Tower pictured in 2017
- Interactive map of the Central Hydraulic Tower area
- Alternative names: Hydraulic Generating Station; Central Hydraulic Tower and Engine House

General information
- Location: Great Float, Birkenhead, England
- Coordinates: 53.4013°N 3.0218°W
- Completed: 1868
- Owner: Peel Ports

Design and construction
- Architect: J. B. Hartley
- Designations

Listed Building – Grade II
- Official name: Hydraulic Generating Station
- Designated: 20 January 1988
- Reference no.: 1258186

Central Hydraulic Tower is a Grade II listed building situated in Birkenhead, England. It was designed by J. B. Hartley to provide the necessary power to move the bridges and lock gates at the adjacent Birkenhead Docks. The building design was based on the Palazzo Vecchio town hall situated in the Piazza della Signoria, Florence, Italy. Currently disused, the building is planned to be used as a Maritime Knowledge Hub as part of the Wirral Waters development scheme.

== History ==
During the Second World War, the building and 110-foot (34 m) tall tower were considerably damaged by aerial bombing but and were later repaired in a more functional instead of architectural style. The large lantern that was once situated at the top of the tower was not replaced. The building is now disused and in a dilapidated condition.

As part of the Wirral Waters development, a new plan for the site was completed in March 2008 for a £12 million redevelopment and restoration of the building by Peel Holdings for it to be converted into a restaurant and bar. A hotel complex with 92 rooms was planned to be constructed immediately adjacent to it. These plans never came to fruition and in September 2015 it was announced that the tower would become part of a £30 million advanced manufacturing and engineering skills centre. Known as the 'Hydraulic Tower and Generator Project', owners Peel intend to create 90,000 sq ft (8,400 m^{2}) of space for offices and workspaces for small to medium fast-growing businesses.

In March 2021, it was announced that the building would be brought back in to use as The Maritime Knowledge Hub and will be a national base for marine engineering research and development and survival training, as well as providing business accelerator space for the maritime sector. The project will cost £23m. Planning permission was granted in May 2023, with work hoping to be started in mid-2023. However, work did not commence in 2023 and in November it was announced the project was on hold due to rising costs.

Wirral Council announced in July 2024 that they would no longer be moving ahead with the scheme, stating they the council could no longer afford their proposed contribution to the project.

== Description ==
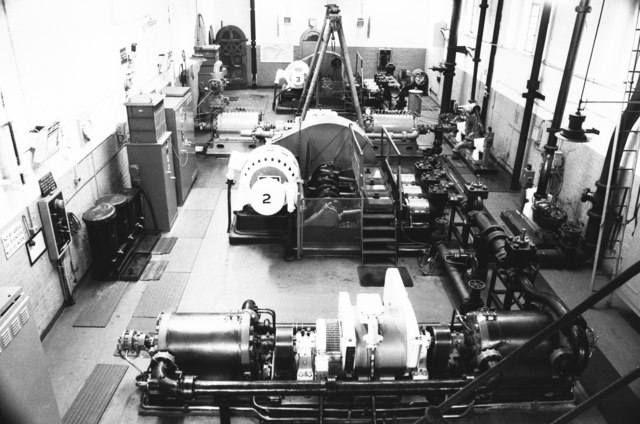
Inside the pump room in the station, taken in 1983 when the station was still in use

Historic England describes the building as being three storeys, made of brick with rock-faced stone dressings. The boiler room was originally home to six boilers, while two engines pumped steam through the system in another room.

== See also ==
- Listed buildings in Wallasey
