= Birkenhead dock disaster =

1909 dam collapse in Wirral, England

Coordinates: 53.401°N 3.030°W

The Birkenhead dock disaster was a tragedy that happened when a temporary dam collapsed during construction of the Vittoria Dock in Birkenhead, Wirral Peninsula, England, on 6 March 1909. It left 14 workers (or "navvies") dead and three injured. The disaster led to a huge public outpouring of sympathy and grief in the local area. However, the Government refused to hold a public inquiry and the cause of the disaster was never definitively established. Very little evidence or documentation surrounding the event now exists.

== Building the Vittoria Dock ==
The £206,000 contract to build a dock on the Vittoria Wharf area of Birkenhead was awarded by the Mersey Docks and Harbour Board in 1905 to John Scott of Darlington. Scott was the son of Sir Walter Scott (1826-1910), one of the greatest regional civil engineering contractors of his era, and had recently built an extension to the docks in Middlesbrough. The Vittoria Dock - sited at the northern end of Vittoria Street - was to serve as an accessible, organised berthing facility for vessels, which were increasing in size. Work began in 1905 and was due to be finished by the end of 1909. However, by March 1909 it was nine months ahead of schedule. The whole project was merely a few hours from completion when the disaster occurred.

== Disaster strikes ==
Just after midnight on 6 March 1909, during a blinding snowstorm, disaster struck. A gang of navvies were working in a 45-foot-deep pit (14 m) which formed the entrance channel to the new dock. They were clearing away rubble and timber, which was hauled up to the dockside by a crane which straddled the excavation. The waters of the neighbouring East Float were held back from the entrance channel by a 200-foot-long (61 m) temporary coffer dam, formed from pilings rammed with mud and cement, which had been built in 1907. There was only a small amount of work left to do, and the whole four-year dock project would be finished by the following evening.

High-tide in the River Mersey had been about 11:15 pm and the East Float was full of water. At around 12:25 am the foundation of the coffer dam gave way without warning; the fifteen workers were overwhelmed by water and debris. A platform carrying the crane, engine and boiler collapsed into the excavation, and, it is believed, trapped the men underwater. Fourteen men were killed, but one survived by clinging on the dock wall until he was rescued. The engine-driver and a boy acting as a signaller were swept into the water but were rescued; the boy being trapped between baulks of timber later had his leg amputated. The disaster widowed seven women and left 13 children fatherless. It took a month for divers to recover all the bodies, and the victims were buried in three mass graves in Flaybrick Hill Cemetery, Birkenhead, now known as Flaybrick Memorial Gardens.

== Aftermath ==
At the ensuing inquest, John Scott's chief engineer claimed that the disaster was probably caused when the base of the coffer dam shifted after pilings from the old dock wall were removed, and this event could not have been foreseen. However, this explanation was never independently tested or verified. One man—John Jones, the operator of the piledriving machine used to build the dam—bravely spoke out at the inquest, claiming there had been shoddy workmanship and rotten building materials had been used on the project. But his evidence was disregarded and the jury, heavily influenced by the coroner's summing-up, returned a verdict that no one was to blame. The Vittoria Dock opened for business four months after the disaster and is still in operation today.
