= Dock Branch Park =

Public park in Birkenhead, Wirral, England

Coordinates: 53.391042°N 3.018680°W

- Type: Public park
- Location: Birkenhead, Merseyside, England.
- Operated by: Wirral Metropolitan Borough Council
- Status: Under construction

Dock Branch Park is a public park which is due to be built in Birkenhead, Merseyside, England. The idea for the park came from Wirral Council's long–term vision for the development of Birkenhead, known as the Birkenhead 2040 Framework. As part of this framework, the council hoped to create more parks and green spaces for the public. The project runs through a community with limited access to green space, scoring among the lowest on the national Fields in Trust Green Space Index.

The park will stretch from Bidston Dock to Rock Ferry, utilising land that was previously occupied by the Birkenhead Dock Branch railway line. The railway line was created in 1847 but with the decline of the docks and rail freight traffic it has been disused since 1993.

Initial phases costing around £13 million, the park will eventually be over a mile long and will cover 30 hectares of land. It is hoped that the park will provide a pedestrian and cycle–friendly route as well as catalysing development land for 1,000 homes, a new outdoor music venue for Future Yard and linking with an enhanced Wirral Transport Museum.

Clearance work on the site began in May 2022 with completion estimated to be in early 2027.

== See also ==
- Birkenhead Park
