= HMLCT 7074 =

Mark 3 Landing Craft Tank

Coordinates: 50°46′49″N 1°05′27″W

LCT 7074
- LCT 7074 on display outside The D-Day Story museum in Portsmouth

History

United Kingdom
- Name: LCT 7074; NSC(L) 19; Landfall
- Owner: Royal Navy
- Builder: Hawthorn Leslie
- Launched: 4 April 1944
- Commissioned: 6 April 1944
- Decommissioned: 1947
- Honours and awards: Normandy, 1944
- Status: Museum ship

General characteristics
- Type: Mark 3 Landing Craft Tank
- Displacement: 300 tons standard, up to 650 tons fully loaded
- Length: 192 ft (59 m)
- Beam: 31 ft (9.4 m)
- Draught: 3 ft 10 in (1.17 m) (forward)
- Installed power: 2 × Sterling Admiral petrol engines
- Propulsion: 2 shafts
- Speed: 11 knots (20 km/h; 13 mph)
- Range: 2,700 nmi (5,000 km)
- Capacity: 350 long tons (356 t) of cargo
- Complement: 12
- Armament: 2 × Oerlikon 20 mm cannon
- Armour: Bridge: 2 1/2 inch Plastic armour; Wheelhouse : 15 lb NM; Gun shields : 20 lb DIHT

HM LCT 7074 is the last surviving Landing Craft, Tank (LCT) in the UK. LCT 7074 is an amphibious assault ship for landing tanks, other vehicles and troops on beachheads. Built in 1944 by Hawthorn Leslie and Company, Hebburn, the Mark 3 LCT 7074 was part of the 17th LCT Flotilla during Operation Neptune in June 1944.

LCT 7074 was decommissioned in 1947, and used by the Master Mariners' Club of Liverpool as their club ship Landfall. She served as a floating nightclub in the 60s and 70s and was acquired by the Warship Preservation Trust in the late 1990s. She was moored at Birkenhead for restoration but the Trust went into liquidation and she later sank in the dock. The vessel was raised by the National Museum of the Royal Navy in October 2014 and transported by sea to Portsmouth for restoration.

== Design ==
LCT 7074 was one of 235 Mark III LCTs; the Mark III was an extended version of the Mark II design. The vessel was built by Hawthorn Leslie at Hebburn and was powered by two American Sterling Admiral petrol engines owing to a shortage of Paxman diesels. Launched on 4 April 1944, the vessel was commissioned into the Royal Navy shortly afterwards.

== D-Day ==
LCT 7074 had two officers and 10 ratings and she was first commanded by Sub Lt John Baggot RNVR who sailed the vessel to Great Yarmouth on the East coast where she joined the 17th LCT Flotilla. In the build-up to the invasion of France LCT 7074 arrived at the River Orwell, near Felixstowe where she was loaded with one Cromwell tank (Note: Of the 22nd Armoured Brigade HQ), two Sherman tanks and seven Stuart light tanks (Note: Of the 5th Royal Tank Regiment) of the 22nd Armoured Brigade. As part of the 17th LCT Flotilla (Assault Group L2), LCT Squadron "H" of the Eastern Task Force, LCT 7074 landed nine of the tanks on Gold Beach.

Following the invasion, the craft spent several months ferrying vehicles, troops, supplies and ammunition across the Channel. In 1945 LCT 7074 underwent conversion to become Naval Service Craft (Large) 19 for use in the Far East. However, the end of the war in the Pacific meant that she was never deployed.

== Post-war history ==
De-commissioned in 1947 she was renamed Landfall and became the club ship for the Master Mariners’ Club of Liverpool. The craft was later converted into a riverfront nightclub. In the late 1990s, the Warship Preservation Trust acquired LCT 7074 and undertook minor restoration work but when the trust went into liquidation in January 2006, all restoration stopped.

== Salvage, restoration and display ==
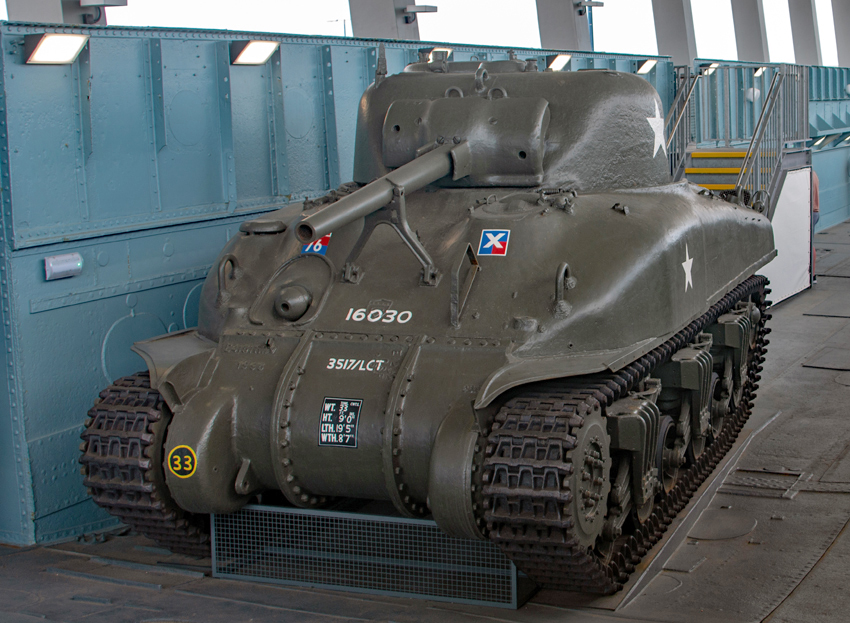
Sherman tank displayed on the tank deck

LCT 7074 was partly submerged at its mooring at East Float in Birkenhead, but following a £916,000 grant from the National Memorial Heritage Fund (NHMF), the craft was salvaged by the National Museum of the Royal Navy during a two-day operation on 15 and 16 October 2014. Over 100 dives by Liverpool diving company Salvesen UK Ltd were required to enable her to be refloated. The LCT was raised and floated into the hold of the MV Condock, which transported the LCT to the BAE Systems Naval Dockyard, Portsmouth to undergo restoration.

Restoration of LCT 7074 was completed in 2020, and she was moved in August to a permanent display at Portsmouth's The D-Day Story museum.

== See also ==
- HMS LCT 147

== Bibliography ==
- Fisher, Stephen & Hewitt, Nick (2020). "Warship Notes: Resurrecting LCT 7074". In Jordan, John (ed.). Warship 2020. Oxford, UK: Osprey. pp. 194–198. ISBN 978-1-4728-4071-4.
