= Bidston Dock =

Former dock in Bidston, England

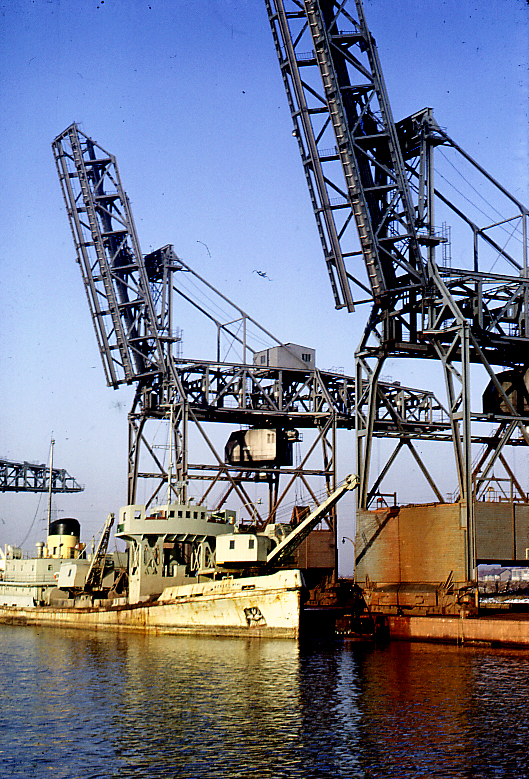
- The iron ore unloading cranes at Bidston Dock in 1964

Location
- Location: Birkenhead, United Kingdom
- Coordinates: 53.4107°N 3.0573°W
- OS grid: SJ297909

Details
- Owner: Peel Holdings (site)
- Opened: March 1933
- Closed: c. 1997

Bidston Dock was a dock at Birkenhead, in England. It was situated to the west of the Great Float, between Bidston and Poulton.

== History ==
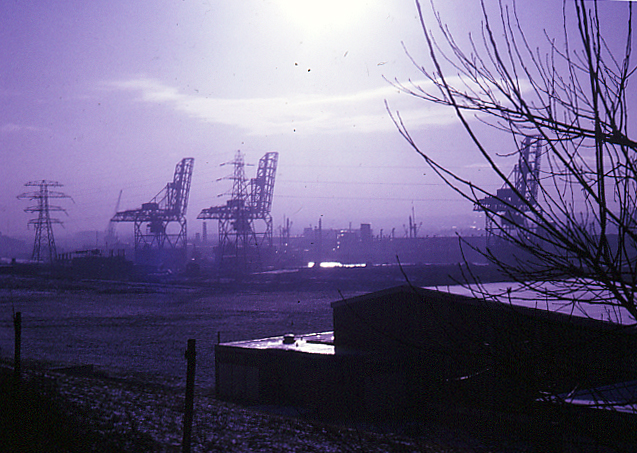
The three iron ore unloading cranes in 1967, seen from Wallasey

A proposal for the construction of the dock on most of what remained of the tidal inlet of Wallasey Pool was outlined in the 1920s. Consisting of the main basin and four additional branches, only part of the main dock was eventually built.

Bidston dock was opened in March 1933 and originally known as the West Float extension. The dock was first used for laying up ships, such as the Ellerman Lines' City of London and City of York. In 1947 the Greek liner Matrona capsized at her moorings when her ballast was removed during conversion work. Having been refloated in June 1948 by seven locomotives operating on specially built tracks, she was towed to Barrow-In-Furness for scrapping. In 1952 the Bibby Line vessel Somersetshire boarded crew at Bidston Dock prior to service as an emigrant ship to Australia.

The dock was significantly altered in the 1950s to allow the transportation of iron ore bound for Shotton. The dock had a trio of large moveable cranes to unload the iron ore, which were dismantled in the late 1990s. The northern quayside of Bidston Dock was the iron ore berth, which was operated by Rea Ltd. The southern quayside was unallocated. By 1992, the dock was only being used for laying up ships, such as the Isle of Man Steam Packet vessels. Some of the final traffic through the dock involved the transportation of timber. Bidston Dock was subsequently closed and was landfilled by 2003.

The dock was served by the Birkenhead Dock Branch railway line and an iron ore train ran regularly to the John Summers Steelworks in Shotton. Monthly shipments of iron ore arrived at Bidston Dock from 1956. Due to the nature of the train, a high degree of motive power was required. Class 40s and pairs of Class 25 locomotives are known to have operated on this track, during its latter days. In the steam era, the iron ore train was known to have been hauled by Class 9F locomotives. The Class 9F locomotive 92203, later named as Black Prince, worked the final steam-hauled iron ore train in November 1967.

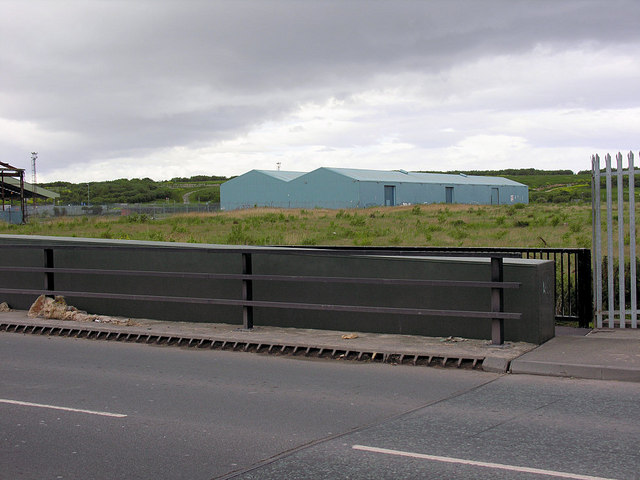
The infilled site in 2007

Though the dock itself was filled, the northern quayside, on which the cranes were situated, and the railway sidings are still intact, although disused.

== Future ==
Peel Holdings have expressed an interest to develop the site of the former dock, as part of the Wirral Waters regeneration project. This part of the project would encompass 571,000 square feet (53,000 m^{2}) of leisure facilities and a retail park.

As of 2022, a new £13 million park is being constructed which will link Rock Ferry with Bidston Dock. Known as Dock Branch Park, it will provide a mile–long pedestrian and cycle corridor between the two locations, as well as providing land for 1,000 homes a new venue for Wirral Transport Museum.
