= Poulton, Merseyside =

Area of Wallasey, Merseyside, England

Coordinates: 53.4123°N 3.0475°W

Poulton
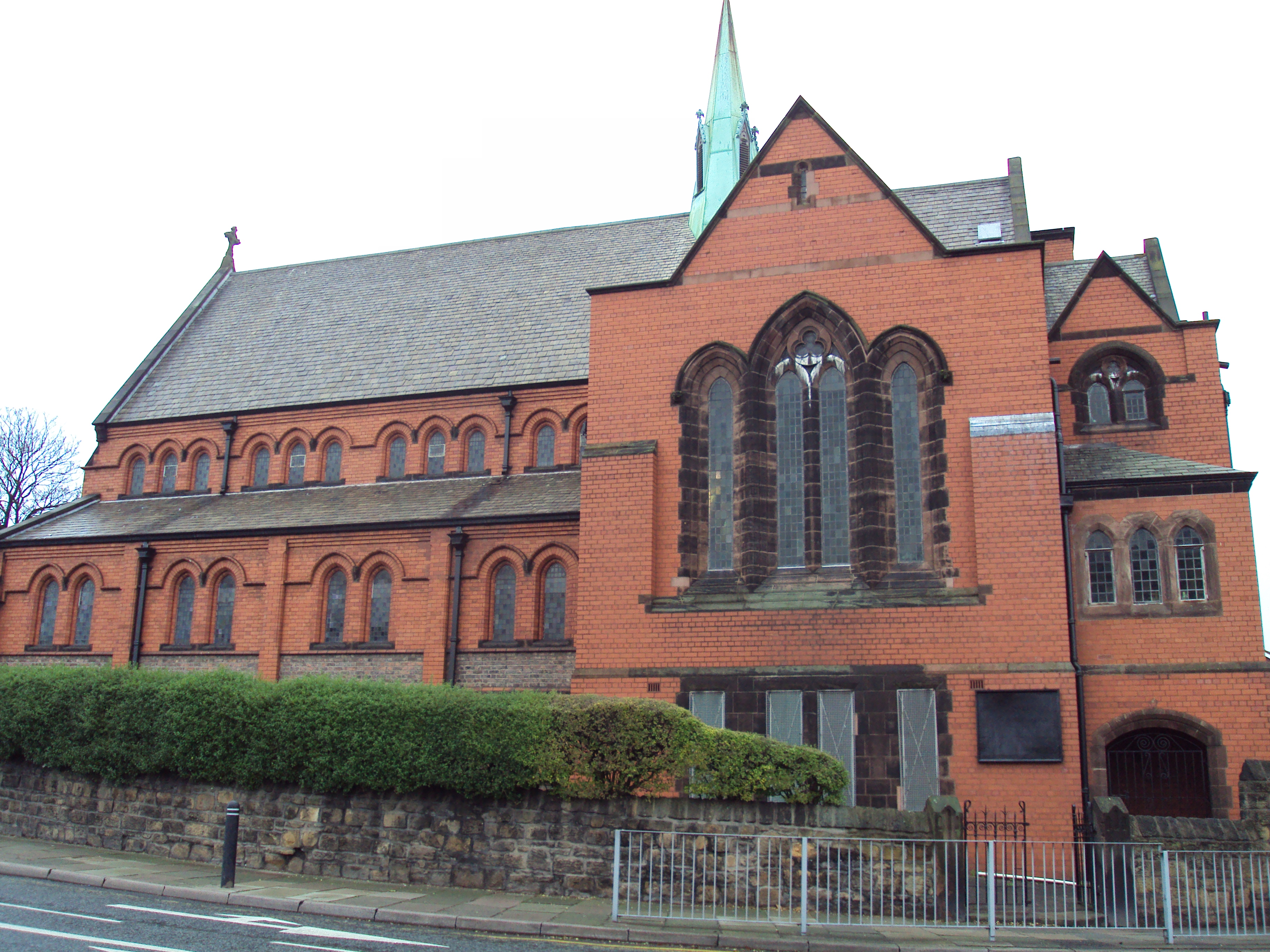
- St Luke's Church, Poulton

- Location within Merseyside
- OS grid reference: SJ308911
  - London: 180 mi (290 km) SE
- Metropolitan borough: Wirral
- Metropolitan county: Merseyside
- Region: North West
- Country: England
- Sovereign state: United Kingdom
- Post town: WALLASEY
- Postcode district: CH44
- Dialling code: 0151
- ISO 3166 code: GB-WRL
- Police: Merseyside
- Fire: Merseyside
- Ambulance: North West
- UK Parliament: Wallasey

Poulton is an area of the town of Wallasey, in the Metropolitan Borough of Wirral, Merseyside, England. It is located on the Wirral Peninsula and bordered by Liscard to the north, Egremont to the north east and Seacombe to the east. The West Float (part of the former Wallasey Pool which gave the area its name), is to the south.

== History ==
The name is Old English in origin and derives from pōl, meaning "pool" and tún, "a farm or settlement".

Originally a small fishing and farming hamlet, Poulton developed in the 19th century through the expansion of the docks and associated industries, becoming part of Poulton cum Seacombe before the two areas split. The settlement was part of the Wallasey parish of the Wirral Hundred, becoming a civil parish in 1866 and then part of the County Borough of Wallasey in 1912. The population of Poulton-cum-Seacombe was 178 in 1801, 3,044 in 1851, and 20,749 in 1901.

The area was served from 1895 by Liscard and Poulton railway station on the Seacombe branch of the Wirral Railway. The station consisted of a single island platform situated in a cutting. Passenger services ended on 4 January 1960 and all services on the line terminated on 16 June 1963.

== Geography ==
Poulton lies on the eastern side of the Wirral Peninsula, approximately 3 km (1.9 mi) south-east of the Irish Sea at New Brighton, 9 km (5.6 mi) east-north-east of the Dee Estuary at West Kirby and about 2 km (1.2 mi) west of the River Mersey at Seacombe. The area is situated at an elevation of about 17 m (56 ft) above sea level. The West Float is to the south of Poulton, separating it from Birkenhead.

== Governance ==
Poulton is part of the Wallasey parliamentary constituency and represented since 1992 by Angela Eagle, a Labour Party MP.

At local government level, the area is predominantly within the Seacombe Ward of the Metropolitan Borough of Wirral. The most recent local elections took place on 5 May 2022.

== Transport ==
Poulton Road is the main street that runs through this area, with Rostherne Avenue, Mill Lane and Gorsey Lane amongst others connecting to it.

Some of the former trackbed of the Wirral Railway branch to Seacombe was used as the approach road to the Kingsway (Wallasey) Tunnel, providing a connection from the M53 motorway to the west of Poulton.

== Bibliography ==
- Mortimer, William Williams (1847). The History of the Hundred of Wirral. London: Whittaker & Co. pp297-299.
