= Warship Preservation Trust =

Former museum in Birkenhead, England

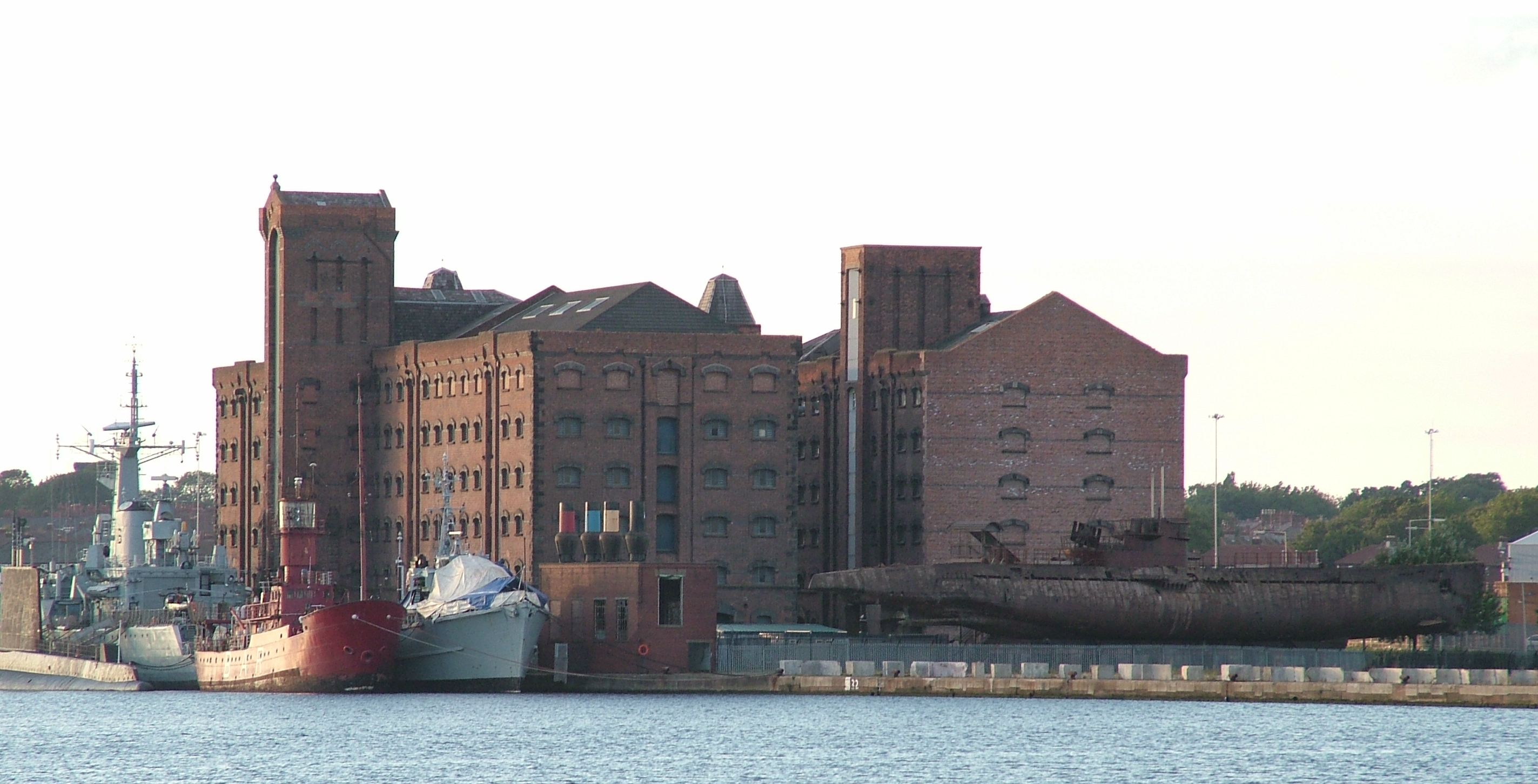
Ships of the trust at Birkenhead Docks.

The Warship Preservation Trust was based in Birkenhead, Wirral, England and hosted a collection of preserved warships.

The collection was brought to Birkenhead in 2002 and was moored in the West Float of the Birkenhead docks complex. The fleet consisted of the frigate HMS Plymouth and the submarine HMS Onyx, both from the Falklands War; the minehunter HMS Bronington; the German submarine U-534; and LCT 7074, the last surviving tank landing craft that took part in D-Day.

On 5 February 2006 the museum closed due to being required to relocate. This was as a result of a decision to redevelop the adjacent Grade II listed former flour milling warehouses. Without a replacement berthing agreement, the Trust subsequently went into voluntary liquidation. By default, ownership of the collection transferred to the Mersey Docks and Harbour Company (MDHC) following the demise of the Trust.

== Fate of collection ==
=== HMS Plymouth ===
Plymouth City Council had expressed an interest in HMS Plymouth, and the HMS Plymouth Preservation Trust undertook to raise the £250,000 needed to bring the warship back to her home city. It had been hoped that the frigate could be berthed at Millbay Docks, but the offer of a berth was withdrawn in January 2007 by Associated British Ports.

=== HMS Onyx ===
In May 2006 HMS Onyx was sold to the Barrow-in-Furness businessman Joe Mullen, for a reported £100,000 as a 'gift to the people of Barrow'. It left Birkenhead on 13 June 2006 to form the centrepiece of a new heritage museum in Cumbria. However, with this new museum also running into difficulty, as of July 2014, the Onyx has since been scrapped.

=== U-534 ===
On 27 June 2007, the Merseytravel transit authority announced that it had acquired U-534 to display at the Woodside Ferry Terminal. For technical reasons and to facilitate economical transportation to its new site, the vessel was cut into four sections. It will be displayed in this form to allow visitors better access and visibility. Beginning on 10 March 2008, the sections, each weighing up to 240 tonnes, were transported to Woodside by floating crane over a number of days.

=== LCT 7074 ===
In October 2014, LCT 7074 was re-floated and moved to Portsmouth for restoration.

=== HMS Bronington ===
Remained moored in Birkenhead until, on 17 March 2016, she sank at her moorings.
