= Vittoria Dock =

Dock in Wirral, England

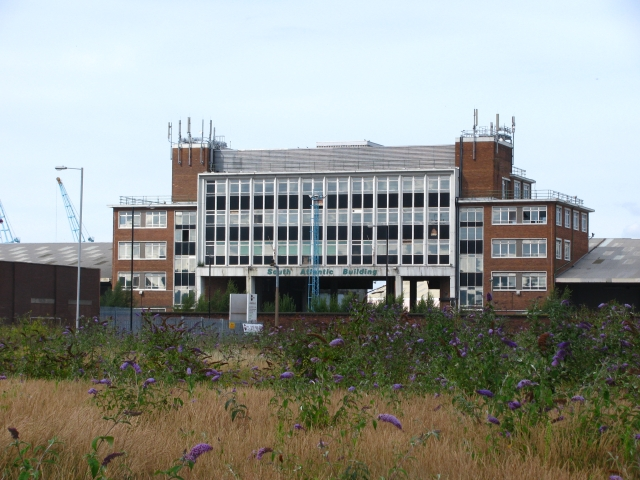
- South Atlantic Building, W.H. Boase & Co. wharfingers office, Vittoria Dock.

Location
- Location: Birkenhead, United Kingdom
- Coordinates: 53.4014°N 3.0303°W
- OS grid: SJ314899

Details
- Owner: Peel Holdings
- Opened: 1909
- Joins: East Float

Vittoria Dock is a dock in Birkenhead, Wirral Peninsula, England. It was built between 1904 and 1908, from land reclaimed during the construction of the Great Float.

== History ==
The dock was designed by Anthony George Lyster. Construction began in 1905, from the land reclaimed during the construction of the Great Float. During its construction on 6 March 1909, a temporary dam collapsed, killing 14 navvies. This incident is now referred to as the Birkenhead Dock Disaster. The dock was opened in 1909, having warehouses on either side.

=== The name Vittoria ===
The dock is named after the Battle of Vittoria, fought on 21 June 1813.

An alternative view is that Vittoria Dock has derived its name as a tribute to the first ship to circumnavigate the globe, Magellan's Vittoria. However, Magellan's ship was named after the church of Santa María de la Victoria de Triana, therefore, this Vittoria naming may be questioned.

Vittoria Dock is sometimes incorrectly quoted as 'Victoria Dock', thought in reference to Queen Victoria. However, the wharf was originally known as Victoria, and the plans of 1843 include a Victoria Dock on the site. Although, when acquired by the Liverpool Corporation, the site may have been renamed to avoid confusion with Victoria Dock.

=== In use ===
Between 1937 and 1941, HMS Conway, a training ship, was based here. Between the 1920s and 1970s, the Vittoria Wharf terminal was operated by Clan Line Steamers Ltd. The southern quayside was operated by Blue Funnel Line Ltd., which loaded two or three ships each week, destined for the Far East. The Brocklebank Line, Houston Line and the Scottish Shire Line also used the dock. The dock was extended west in 1960, and fell into disuse as container shipping came into use.

When the Warship Preservation Trust closed in February 2006, most of its exhibits, which included the Rothesay-class frigate HMS Plymouth and wooden-hulled minesweeper HMS Bronington, were later moved to Vittoria Dock for safe storage.

== Future ==
The dock is included in Peel Group's £4.5bn Wirral Waters redevelopment. The Baseline Study of July 2008 has been endorsed by Wirral Borough Council. In February 2009 the initial stage of the planning application for the first major mixed-use development masterplan/quarter was submitted. The development would be expected to take up to 30 years.

== Gallery ==
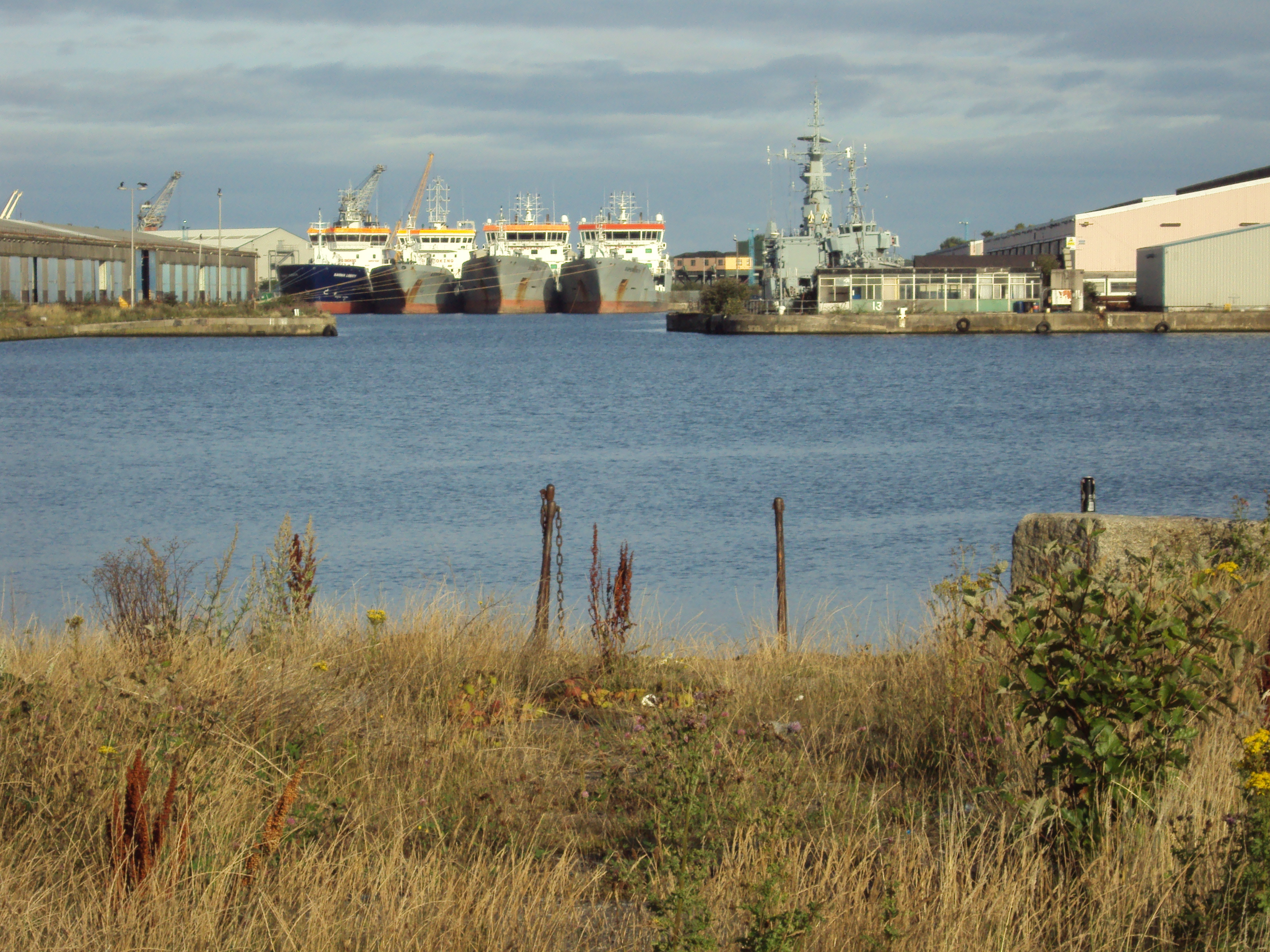
Various ships berthed at Vittoria Dock.

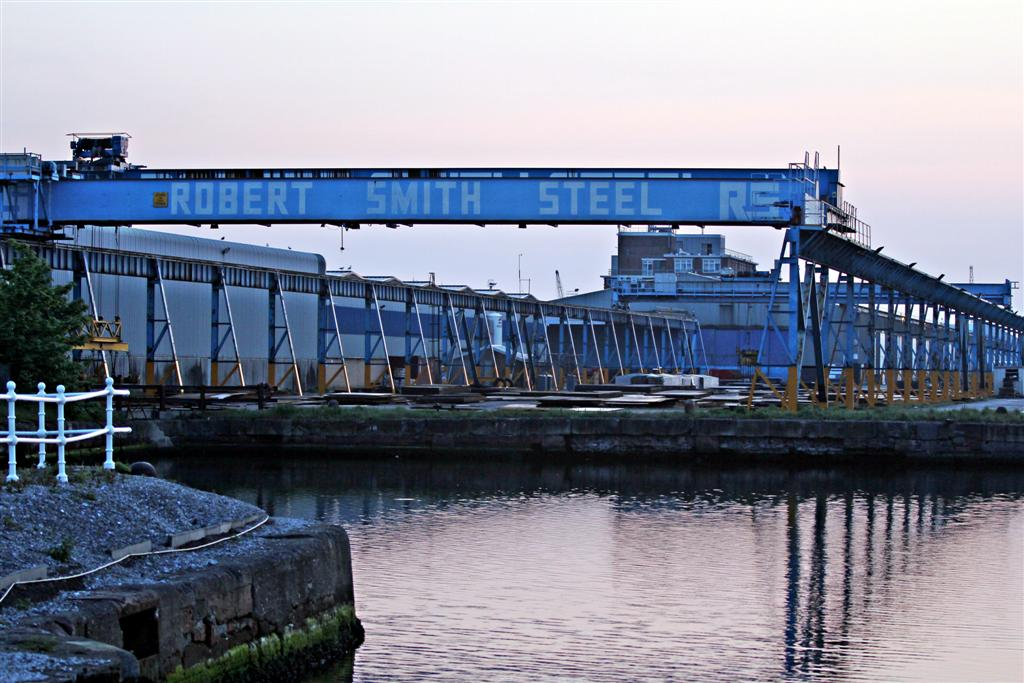
The Robert Smith Steel loading gantry.

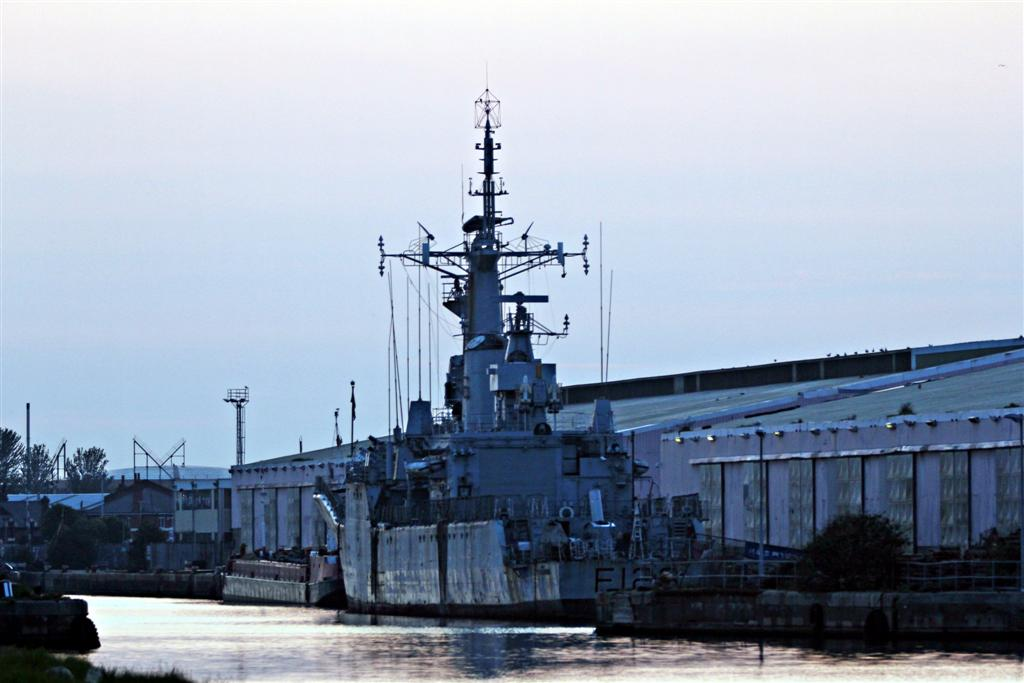
HMS Plymouth laid up at Vittoria Wharf.
