= Alfred Dock =

Docks in Wallasey, England

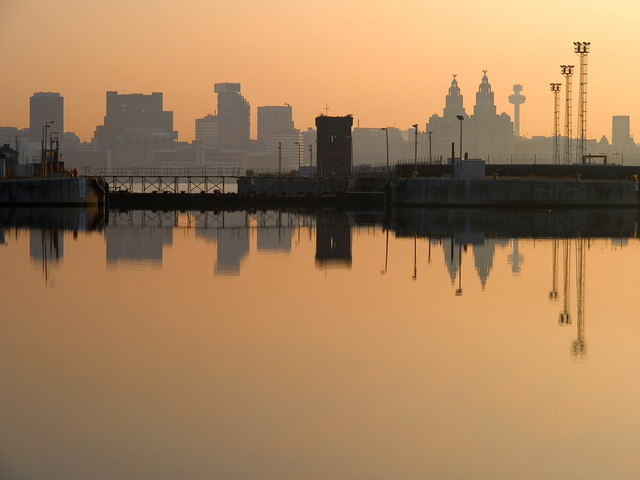
- Alfred Dock with the Liverpool skyline in the background

Location
- Location: Wallasey, United Kingdom
- Coordinates: 53°24′13″N 3°01′12″W
- OS grid: SJ322901

Details
- Owner: Peel Holdings
- Opened: 21 June 1866
- Joins: River Mersey; East Float
- Area: 8 acres (3.2 ha)
- Quay length: 460 yd (420 m)

Alfred Dock is a dock at Wallasey, Merseyside, England. The dock covers an area of 8 acres (32,000 m^{2}) and provides access to the Great Float from the River Mersey.

== History ==
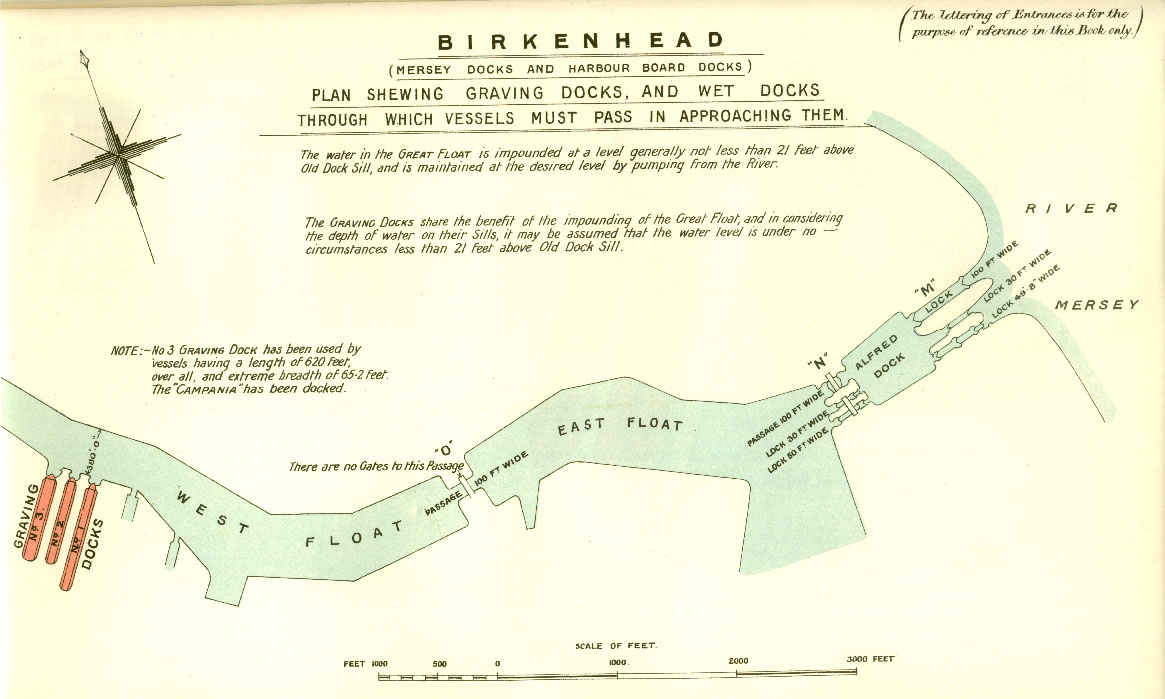
1909 map of the Alfred Dock, showing the original lock entrances and passages.

In 1856, J. B. Hartley produced plans for alternative river access to the Great Float, as the Great Low Water Basin proved to be insufficient. Completed in 1866, the dock was named after Prince Alfred, Duke of Edinburgh, second son of Queen Victoria, and opened by him on 21 June 1866.

Designed to replace the Great Low Water Basin, the dock was originally constructed with three lock entrances from the river of 30 ft (9.1 m), 50 ft (15 m) and 100 ft (30 m), and three passages onwards to the Great Float. This provided much expanded access to the Birkenhead dock system, which was also served by an entrance channel further south via Morpeth Dock.

In order to accommodate larger vessels, the 30 ft (9.1 m) and 50 ft (15 m) lock entrances and passages were combined into an 80 ft (24 m) system and deepened, between 1926-9. This meant the removal of a river lock entrance and an access channel to the Great Float, in order to reconstruct the remaining facilities. At the same time, a bascule bridge and a swing bridge were constructed over two remaining passages. The dock was arranged so that the whole dock could be used as a lock.

By the beginning of the 1980s, the remaining southern lock entrance had closed and was partly filled in. The redevelopment of Tower Road over a decade later precipitated in the removal of the swing bridge and the sealing up of the southern passage.

The north quayside of Alfred Dock was an open quay. The southern quayside was unallocated.

== Present ==
Of the existing two river entrances, only the north locks remain operational. Tower Road, which links Birkenhead with the Seacombe area of Wallasey, divides Alfred Dock from the Great Float via a bascule bridge. This bridge is the last remaining of the former Four Bridges which crossed the dock system at this point.
