= Great Float =

Body of water in England

The Great Float
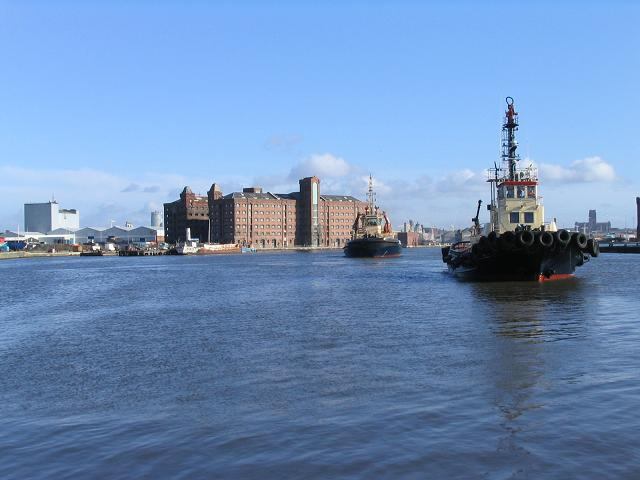
- Tugs Svitzer Stanlow (left) and Thorngarth (right) on East Float with the converted grain warehouse in the background, seen from Duke Street Bridge

Location
- Location: Birkenhead, England, United Kingdom
- Coordinates: 53.40320°N 3.03780°W
- OS grid: SJ310901

Details
- Owner: Peel Holdings
- Operator: Mersey Docks and Harbour Company
- Opened: 1860
- Type: Wet dock
- Purpose: Cargo transfer; Ship repair and layup
- Joins: Alfred Dock; Vittoria Dock
- Area: 52 acres, 319 sq yd (21.0703 ha) (West Float); 59 acres, 3,786 sq yd (24.1938 ha) (East Float)
- Width at entrance: 100 ft (30 m)
- Quay length: 2 mi 210 yd (3.41 km) (West Float); 1 mi 1,506 yd (2.99 km) (East Float)
- Cargo type: Bulk
- Transport links: A5139 (road); Birkenhead Dock Branch (rail, disused)

The Great Float is a body of water on the Wirral Peninsula, England, formed from the natural tidal inlet, the Wallasey Pool. It is split into two large docks, East Float and West Float, both part of the Birkenhead Docks complex. The docks run approximately 2 miles (3 km) inland from the River Mersey, dividing the towns of Birkenhead and Wallasey. The Great Float consists of 110 acres (45 ha) of water and more than 4 miles (6 km) of quays.

== History ==
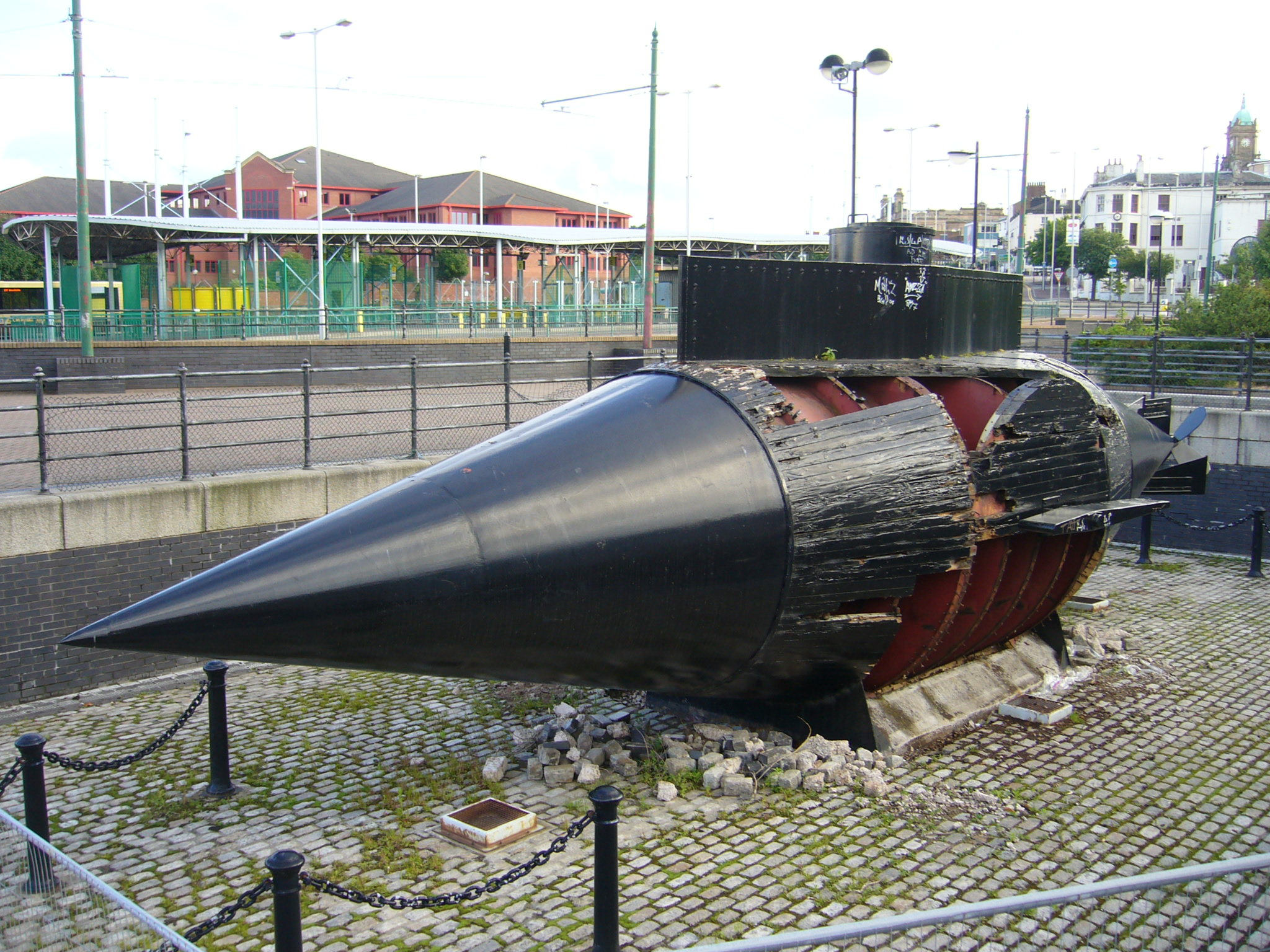
A replica of Resurgam on display at Woodside

Unlike in Liverpool, where the docks were built along the coastline of the River Mersey, Birkenhead Docks were designed as an inland system by enclosing the tidal inlet of Wallasey Pool. The construction of a cofferdam enabled land reclamation and excavations to take place. After the establishment of the Great Low Water Basin, Morpeth Dock and Egerton Dock, the Great Float was formed between 1851 and 1860 from most of what remained of Wallasey Pool. The plans for its construction were originally shown in 1844 in the Liverpool Standard newspaper. Designed by James Meadows Rendel, protégé of Thomas Telford, the scheme was managed by the Birkenhead Dock Company until a financial crisis in 1847. The docks were taken over by the Liverpool Corporation in 1855. By 1858, the rights to dock ownership and revenues were transferred to the Mersey Docks and Harbour Board, based in Liverpool.

Graving docks were built in 1864 and 1877, on the south side of West Float. Established in 1853, Thomas Brassey's Canada Works was built to the east of the Great Float. The entrance to the Great Float was originally through the Great Low Water Basin, which was enclosed in 1877 as Wallasey Dock. After this date, access from the river was provided via Alfred Dock and Morpeth Dock.

The Resurgam, one of the first submarines, was tested in the Great Float in 1879.

In the early 20th-century, Birkenhead Docks became an important flour milling centre, with numerous companies, including Joseph Rank Ltd and Spillers, located on the Great Float's quaysides. In the 1990s, long after the industry had gone into decline, most of these buildings were demolished. Two large warehouses remain, which have now been converted into residential apartments.

The Great Float was the site of the Warship Preservation Trust's exhibits from 2002 until its closure in February 2006.

LCT 7074 Landfall is the last remaining tank landing craft which had served during D-Day. The landing craft was one of the Warship Preservation Trust exhibits and had sunk in East Float following the liquidation of the trust in 2006. The craft was refloated on 16 October 2014.

== Docks ==
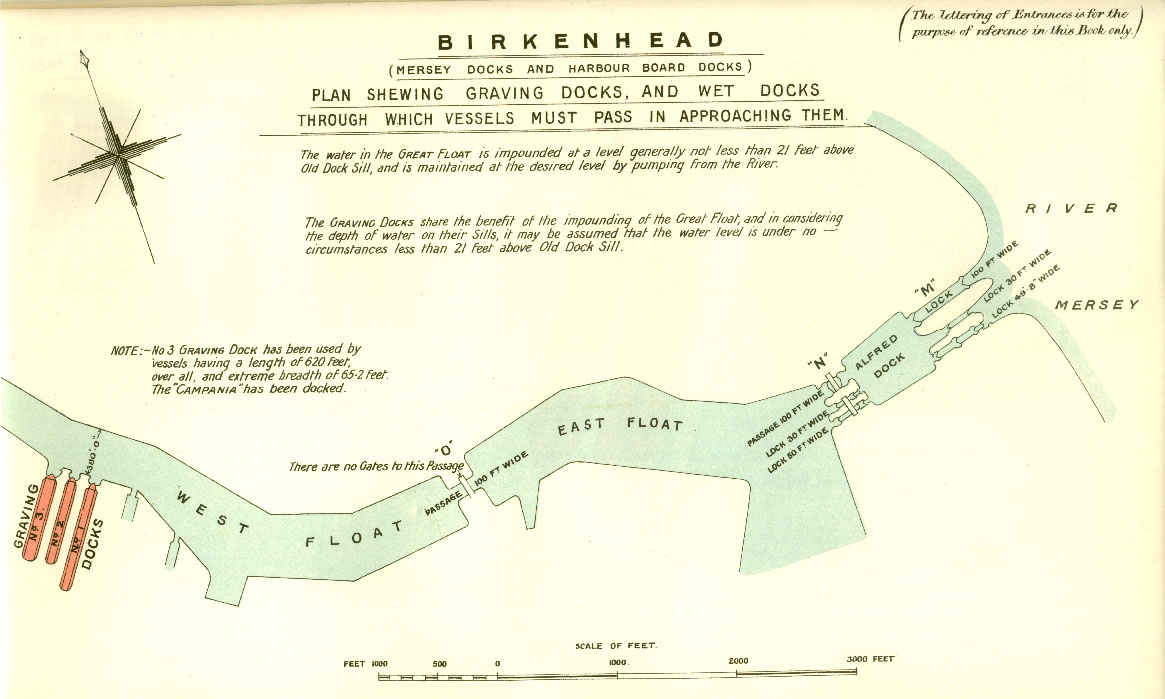
The Great Float in 1909, divided between the East & West Floats

The following docks were originally accessible from the Great Float:

Dock	Opened	Closed	Details
Alfred Dock	1866		Entrance from/exit to River Mersey.
Bidston Dock	1933	2002-3	Filled in.
Egerton Dock	1847		Not used. Passage to Great Float closed.
Vittoria Dock	1909		
Wallasey Dock	1877	2001	Filled in. Site is part of the Twelve Quays development.

In addition, three graving docks existed in the Great Float for ship repairs. Bidston No.3 Dock remains in use as part of the facilities of Cammell Laird Shiprepairers and Shipbuilders Ltd. The other graving docks were filled in during the 1980s.

== Quays ==
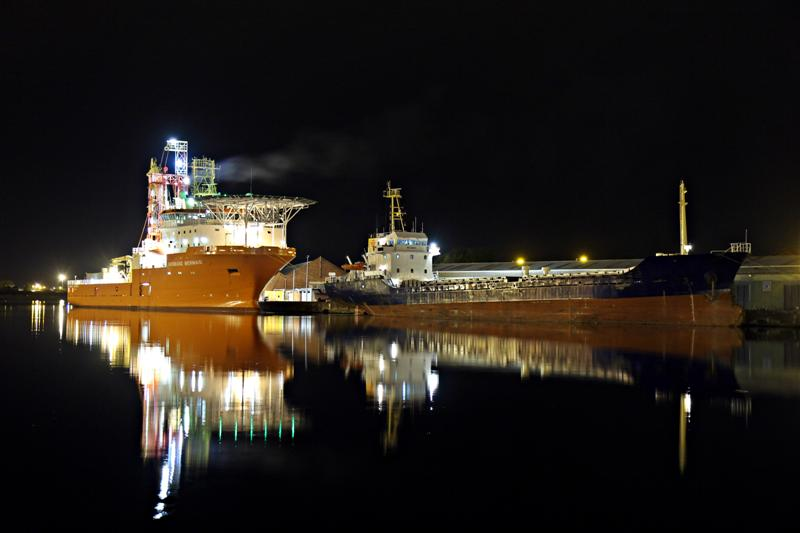
Normand Mermaid and MV Most Sky on the North side of West Float.

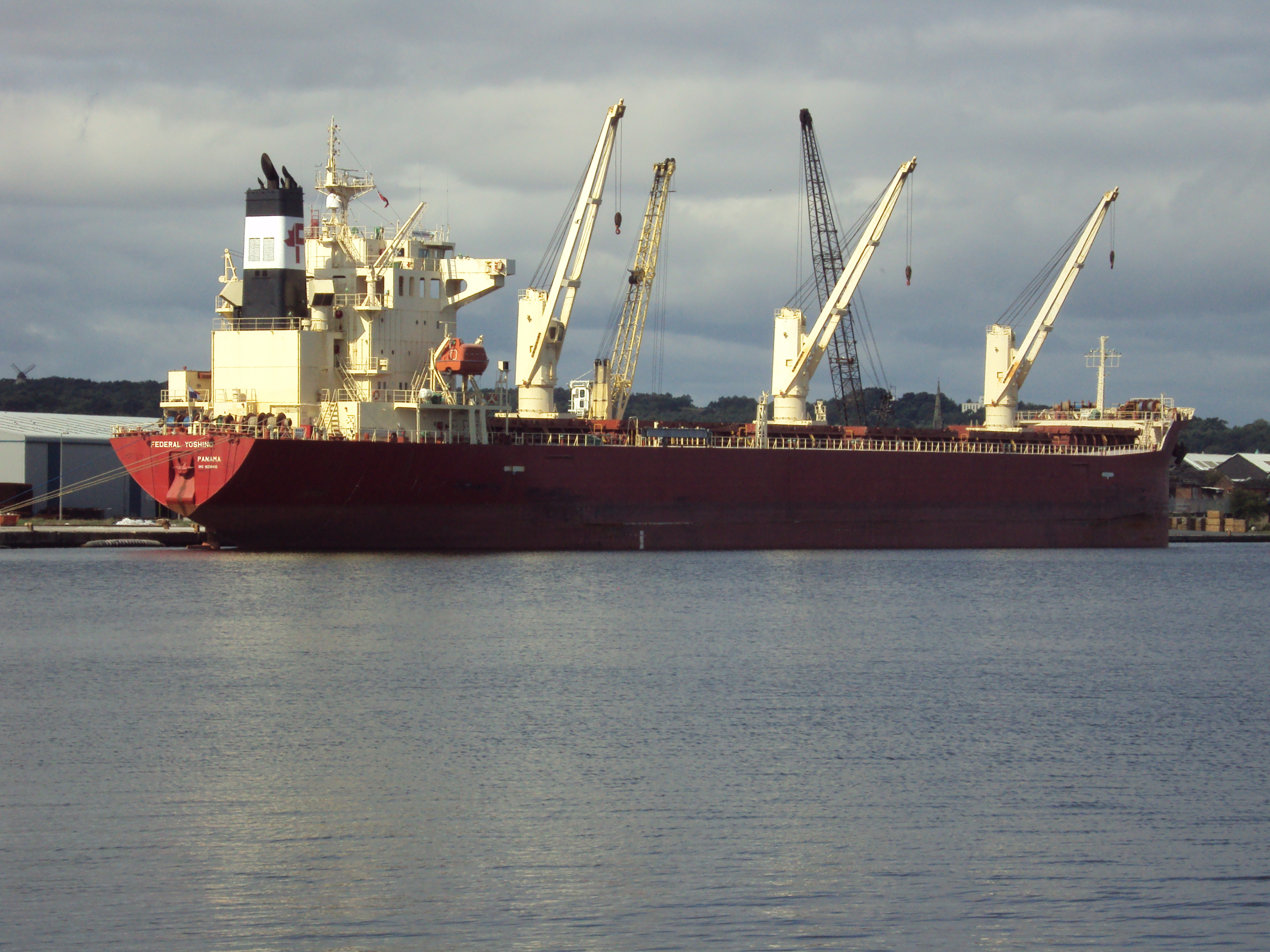
Federal Yoshino on the South side of West Float.

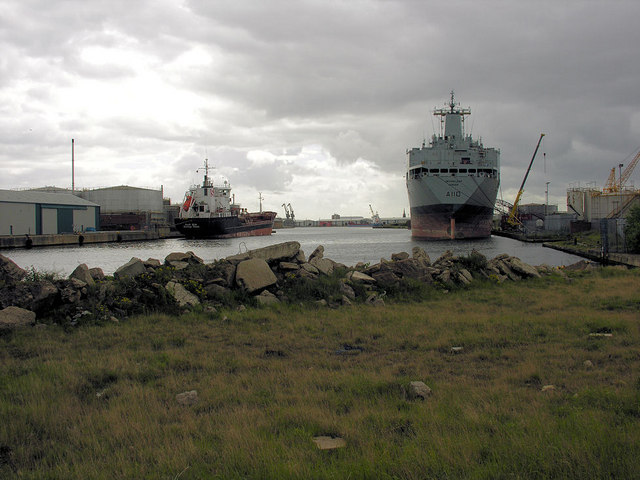
RFA Orangeleaf berthed at the South side of West Float, with Produmas on the North quayside.

=== East Float ===
Quay	Operator
East Quay	T&J Brocklebank Ltd.
North Side, Mortar Mill Quay	(Nippon Yusen Kaisha; Gellatly Hankey & Co. Ltd – Agents)
E&W Towers (Grain Storage)	Liverpool Grain Storage & Transit Co. Ltd.
(Grain berth)	Ranks Buchanan Mill
North Side No.1 Duke Street	Unallocated
North Side No.3 Duke Street	Unallocated
Cathcart Street	Blue Funnel Line Ltd.

=== West Float ===
Quay	Operator
North Side	
Nos. 1 & 2 Sections	Bibby/Henderson Lines
Nos. 3 & 4 Sections	Hall/City Lines
No. 5 Section	Harrison/Hall Lines
Petroleum Quay	Open
Grain Berth	Spillers Uveco Mill
Lewis' Quay West End	Clan Line Steamers Ltd.
Lewis' Quay East End	Oil Quay
South Side	
Ilchester Wharf	Oil Quay
Grain Berth	Spillers Beaufort Road Mill
Grain Berth	Ranks Ocean Mill
Cavendish Quay West End	87 Ton Crane
Cavendish Quay East End (REA's Cavendish Wharf)	Rough Cargo Berths (REA Ltd.)

== Bridges ==
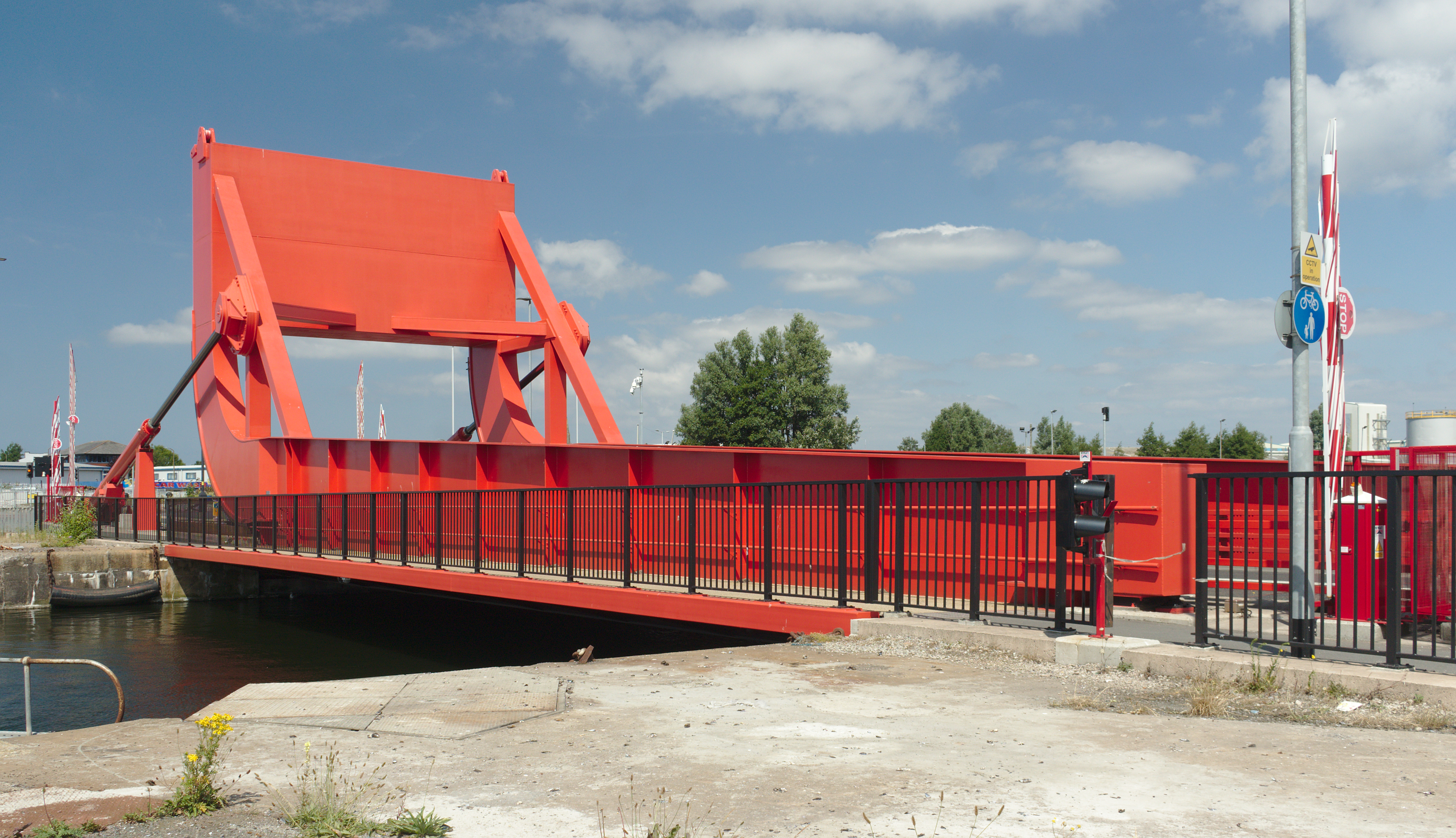
The "A" bridge of the Four Bridges, viewed from the southwest pavement in July 2021

=== Four Bridges ===
Historically, four movable bridges existed along the A554 Tower Road connecting the Seacombe district of Wallasey with Birkenhead: two between the Great Float and Alfred Dock, one between the Great Float and Wallasey Dock and one between the Great Float and Egerton Dock. When originally built, all four were hydraulic swing bridge types. In the 1930s, most were replaced by bascule bridges.

Only two bridges remain, but they remain known collectively as "Four Bridges": a northern red girdered bascule bridge, known as the "A" bridge, and a southern bridge, known as the "C" bridge, which was replaced with a modern flat-deck fixed concrete slab in 2017. Renovation work in the same year also replaced the "A" bridge with a lifting bridge powered by hydraulic rams. Work was expected to be completed by November 2017 but, due to complications, the bridge was not reopened until 28 June 2018.

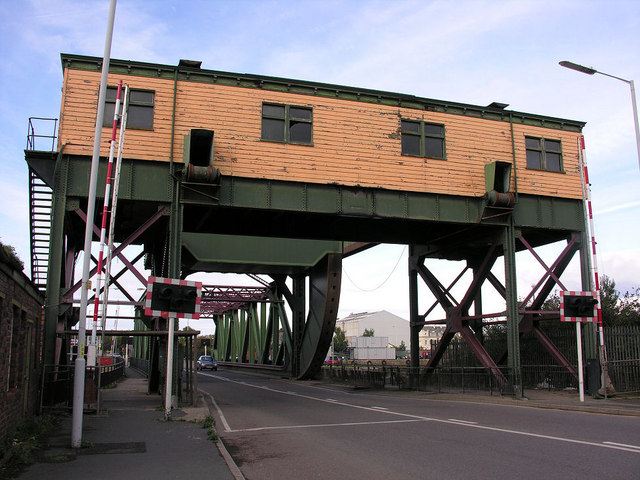
Duke Street Bridge in October 2007

=== Duke Street Bridge ===
Joining the southern end of the Poulton district of Wallasey with the north end of Birkenhead, Duke Street bridge is also a bascule bridge but with painted green girders. Originally, it was a swing bridge.

=== Penny Bridge ===
Furthest upstream is the Penny Bridge, on Wallasey Bridge Road, which crosses the head of the pool to connect Poulton with Bidston in Birkenhead. Replacing an earlier wooden bridge of 1843, the name derives from the 1896 one penny toll to cross in one direction. The bridge was replaced again in 1926 and provided access to Bidston Dock. The bridge was replaced by a new swing bridge in 1996 but since the dock itself has been filled in the mechanism has fallen into disrepair through lack of use and the bridge is now effectively a static structure.

== Central Hydraulic Tower and Engine House ==
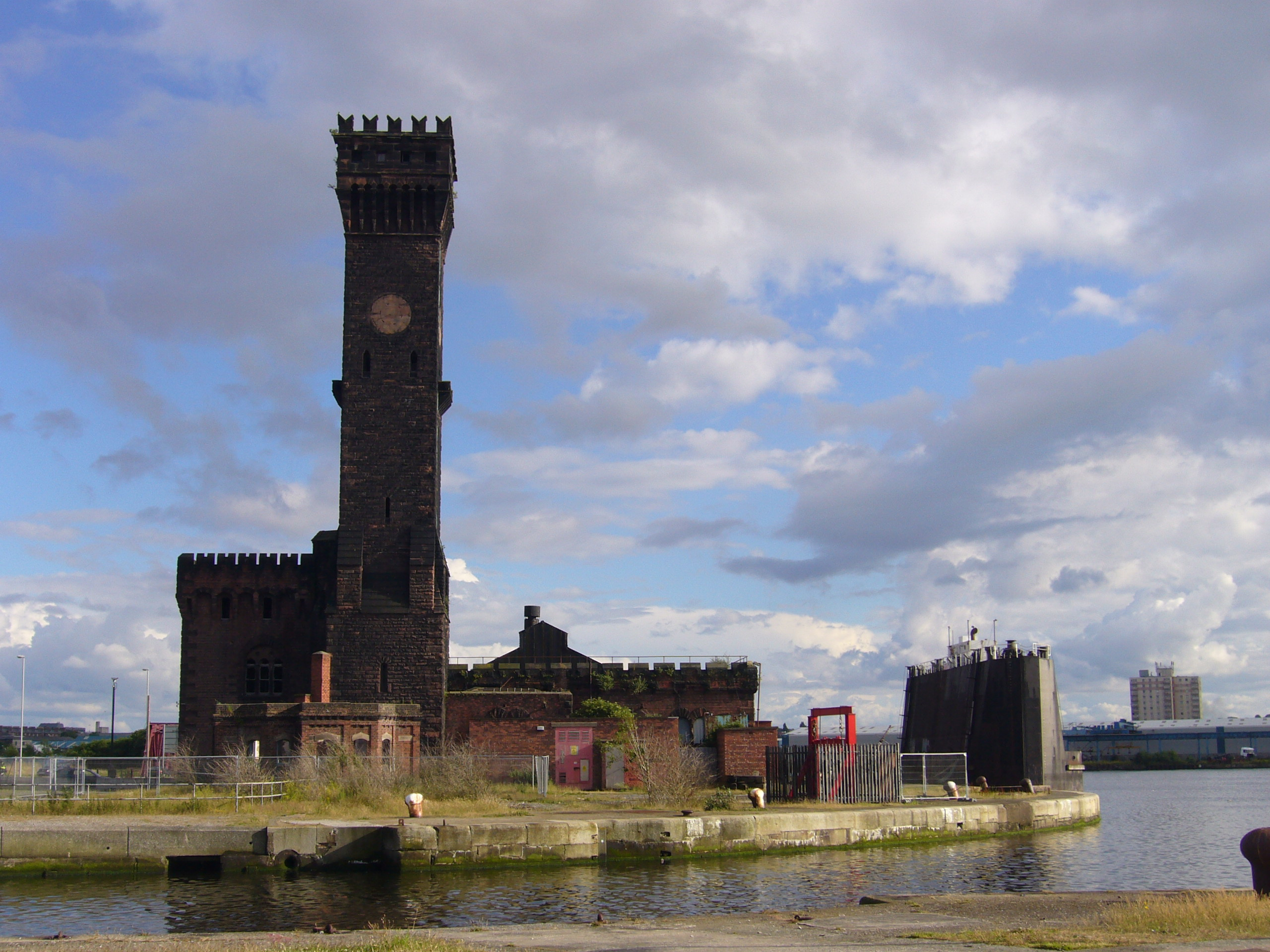
Central Hydraulic Tower

Jesse Hartley, who was responsible for many of Liverpool's maritime structures – including the Albert Dock, designed the Central Hydraulic Tower and Engine House (the tower is an accumulator tower). Providing power for the movement of lock gates and bridges at Birkenhead Docks, it was completed in 1863. The design of the building was based on the Palazzo Vecchio in the Piazza Della Signoria, Florence, Italy. In March 2021, it was announced that the building would be brought back in to use as a Maritime Knowledge Hub and will be a national base for marine engineering research and development and survival training as well as providing business accelerator space for the maritime sector. The project will cost £23m.

== Wirral Waters ==
Peel Holdings announced on 6 September 2006 the Wirral Waters project. This would allow for a £4.5bn of investment in the regeneration of the dockland area. This equates with an investment of over £14,000 for each of the 320,000 population of Wirral. At the East Float and Vittoria Dock, the development would include several 50-storey skyscrapers, 5,000,000 square feet (465,000 m^{2}) of new office space and 11,000,000 square feet (1,000,000 m^{2}) for new residential apartments. A retail and leisure quarter at the former Bidston Dock site would encompass another 571,000 square feet (53,000 m^{2}) of space. The whole project is estimated to create over 27,000 permanent new jobs, aside from the employment required for construction and other peripheral employment.

The Wirral Waters Baseline Study of July 2008 has been endorsed by Wirral Borough Council. In February 2009 the first stage of the planning application for the first major mixed use development masterplan/quarter was submitted. The development would be expected to take up to 30 years. The scheme is included in the Wirral Local Plan 2020–2035.
