= Egerton Dock =

Disused dock in Birkenhead, England

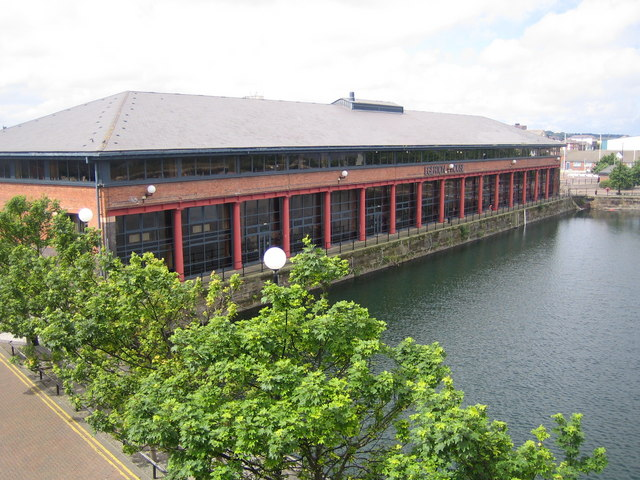
- Egerton House, originally opened on 24 June 1873 as a railway goods warehouse.

Location
- Location: Birkenhead, United Kingdom
- Coordinates: 53.39887°N 3.01964°W
- OS grid: SJ322895

Details
- Owner: Peel Holdings
- Opened: 1847
- Joins: Morpeth Dock

Egerton Dock is a dock at Birkenhead, in England. The dock is situated between East Float and Morpeth Dock, within Birkenhead's dock system.

== History ==
The dock was the second named as Egerton Dock along the Mersey, the first being the forerunner to Harrington Dock. Named after Sir Philip de Malpas Grey Egerton who laid the foundation stone in October 1844, the dock was completed in 1847. This was just prior to a suspension of the dock scheme, due to a financial crisis affecting the Birkenhead Dock Company.

The dock was originally accessible to shipping from the East Float and via the Morpeth Dock entrance from the River Mersey. Both these passages have since been filled in, making both docks effectively landlocked.

For the majority of its use, it served the LNWR and CLC goods stations which adjoined the dock. The LNWR had a warehouse, on the southern quayside, much used for storing bananas. The dock was partially filled in 1991, removing access from East Float.

== Egerton Bridge ==
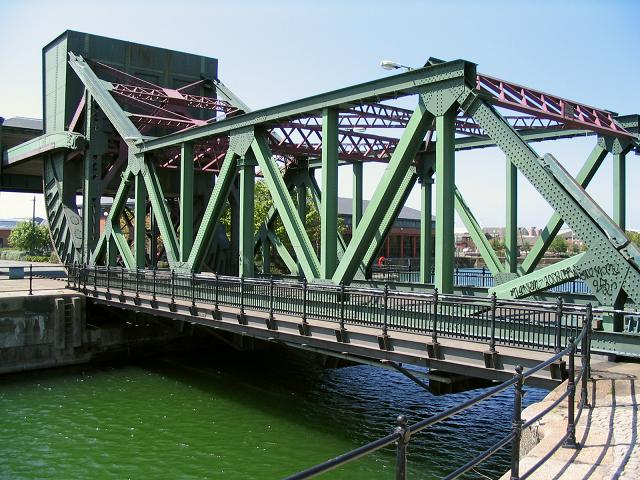
Egerton Bridge

Egerton Bridge is situated between Egerton Dock and Morpeth Dock and is a working example of a bascule bridge. It was built between 1928 and 1931, as one of four similar bascule bridges in the Merseyside docks, replacing an earlier swing bridge. The bridge and the machine house were completely restored in 1993 and opened to the public in 1995.

== See also ==
- Listed buildings in Birkenhead
