= Morpeth Dock =

Landlocked dock in Birkenhead, Wirral, England

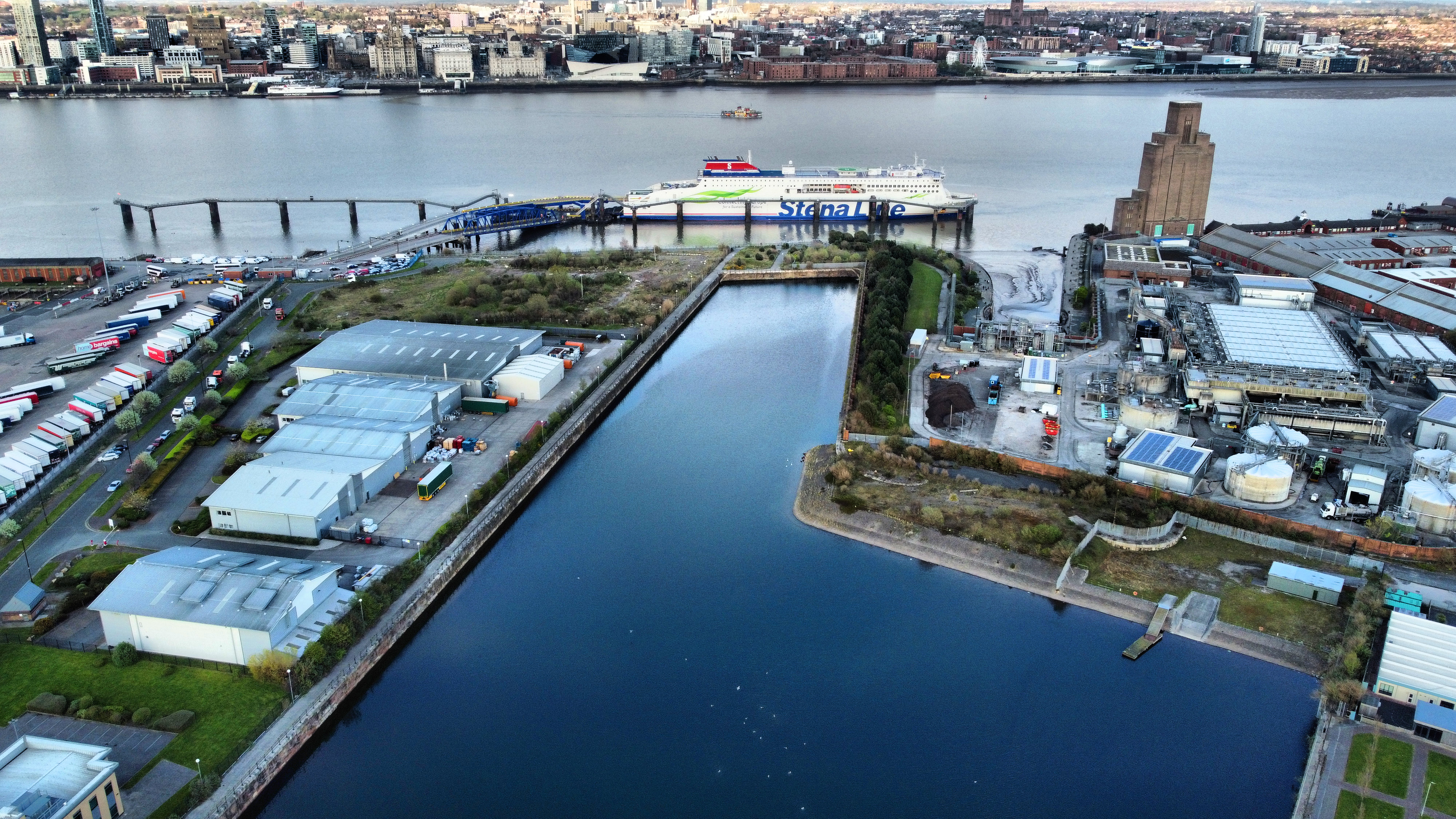
- Morpeth Dock in 2022

Location
- Location: Birkenhead, United Kingdom
- Coordinates: 53.3989°N 3.0121°W
- OS grid: SJ324895

Details
- Owner: Peel Holdings
- Opened: 1847
- Joins: Egerton Dock; River Mersey (former); Morpeth Branch Dock (former)

Morpeth Dock is a dock at Birkenhead, Wirral Peninsula, England. The dock is situated between the River Mersey and Egerton Dock.

== History ==
Built between 1844 and 1847, it is named after Lord Morpeth, the 7th Earl of Carlisle, who was the First Commissioner of Woods and Forests. The dock was opened in 1847, and the branch dock was built between 1866 and 1868. By 1872, the dock had been significantly remodelled with the branch dock and a canal basin for the GWR's goods station. Morpeth Dock Goods station was used by the GWR as the Birkenhead end of cross-river traffic to the Manchester Dock. Morpeth Dock provided berths for the Bibby Line, the Brocklebank Line, Holt and the Pacific Steam Navigation Company, all of which worked to the Far East. The branch dock was too small for ships, and was used to site one of the Queensway Tunnel ventilation towers in 1934, along with a water pumping station in 1955. The pumping station later became a water treatment plant, now replacing the entire basin of the branch dock.

Originally, the dock connected directly to the River Mersey via the locks of the Morpeth River Entrance, although the entrance channel has since been partially infilled and the locks removed after being disused for some years. Access to the Great Float via Egerton Dock has also been removed, making both docks effectively landlocked.

The dockside sheds of the former Morpeth Branch Dock were restored around 1992, and contain the Pacific Road Business Centre.

== One O'Clock Gun ==
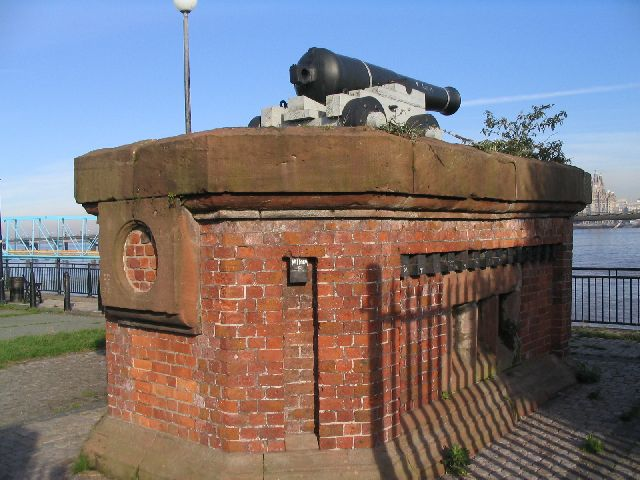
The One O'Clock Gun.

Situated close to the dock and overlooking the river, the One O'Clock Gun provided a time signal to shipping on the Mersey. It was fired electrically from Bidston Observatory for the first time on 21 September 1867 and the original cannon was a relic of the Crimean War. Due to the advent of radio and increasing maintenance costs, by 1932 it was proposed to discontinue the One O'Clock Gun. Although this did not occur, firing was suspended during the Second World War. The tradition ceased altogether on 18 July 1969.

A One O'Clock Gun is still fired at Edinburgh Castle.

== Bomb discovery ==
Birkenhead docks, as well as the surrounding area, were heavily bombed by the Luftwaffe during the Second World War. In May 2006, a 60-year-old, 500 kg (1,102 lb) bomb was discovered by the Royal Navy's Northern Diving Group and disposed of by the minesweeper HMS Atherstone. It was found embedded in mud in the river, near to the former entrance to Morpeth Dock and may have been disturbed during dredging work at the Twelve Quays ferry terminal. The bomb was later detonated in Liverpool Bay.

== See also ==
- Listed buildings in Birkenhead
