= Bromborough Rake railway station =

Railway station on the Chester & Ellesmere Port branches of the Wirral line in England

Bromborough Rake
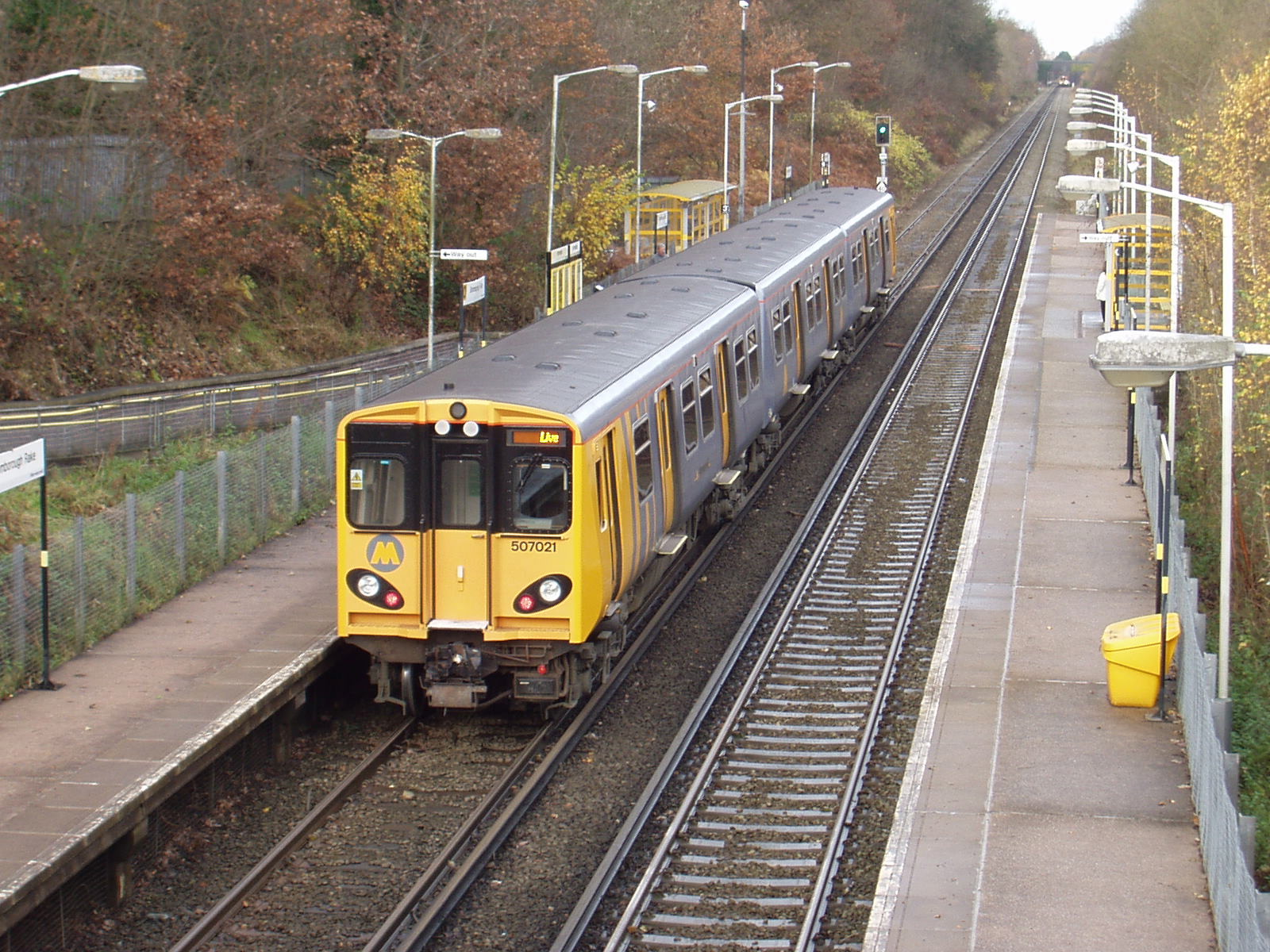
- 507021 at Bromborough Rake

General information
- Location: Bromborough, Wirral; England
- Coordinates: 53.3298°N 2.9900°W
- Grid reference: SJ341819
- Manager: Merseyrail
- Transit authority: Merseytravel
- Platforms: 2

Other information
- Station code: BMR
- Fare zone: B2
- Classification: DfT category E

Key dates
- 1985: Opened

Passengers
- 2021/22: ▲0.231 million
- 2022/23: ▼0.213 million
- 2023/24: ▲0.228 million
- 2024/25: ▼0.223 million
- 2025/26: ▲0.277 million
Location
Notes
- Passenger statistics from the Office of Rail and Road

Bromborough Rake railway station is one of two stations serving the town of Bromborough in Merseyside, England. The station is situated on the Chester and Ellesmere Port branches of the Wirral Line, part of the Merseyrail network.

== History ==
The station was opened by British Rail in 1985, to coincide with the electrification of the line between Rock Ferry and Hooton, which allowed through trains to Liverpool, via the Mersey Railway Tunnel.

== Facilities ==
The station is staffed, during all opening hours, and has platform CCTV. There is a payphone and a booking office. There are departure and arrival screens, on the platform, for passenger information. Each of the two platforms has sheltered seating. There is no car park at the station, though there is a drop-off point. There is secure cycle parking for 20 cycles. Access to the station booking office is straightforward. Access to both platforms is by ramp, allowing easy access for passengers with wheelchairs or prams.

== Services ==
As of 27 December 2023, trains operate every 30 minutes between Liverpool and Ellesmere Port, and every 15 minutes between Liverpool and Chester. Northbound trains operate via Birkenhead Hamilton Square station in Birkenhead and the Mersey Railway Tunnel to Liverpool. Southbound trains travel towards Hooton, where the lines to Chester and Ellesmere Port divide. These services are provided by Merseyrail's fleet of Class 777 EMUs.

Preceding station	National Rail	Following station
Bromborough towards Chester or Ellesmere Port	Merseyrail; Wirral Line; Ellesmere Port/Chester	Spital towards Liverpool Central
