= Spital railway station =

Railway station on the Chester & Ellesmere Port branches of the Wirral line in England

Spital
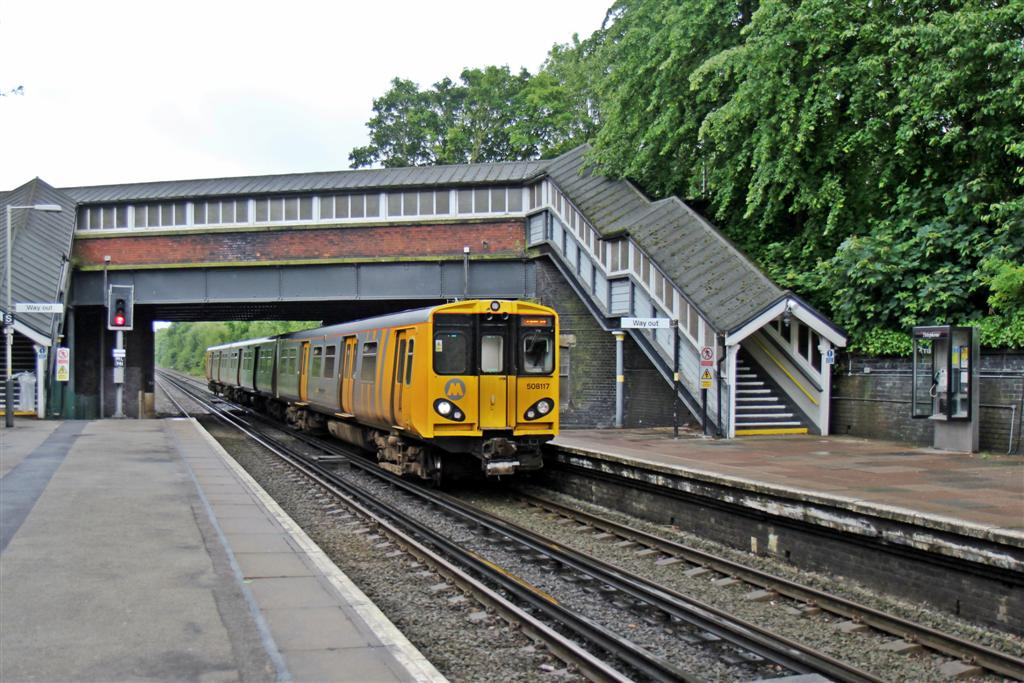

General information
- Location: Spital, Wirral; England
- Coordinates: 53.3400°N 2.9941°W
- Grid reference: SJ338831
- Manager: Merseyrail
- Transit authority: Merseytravel
- Platforms: 2

Other information
- Station code: SPI
- Fare zone: B1/B2
- Classification: DfT category E

Passengers
- 2021/22: ▲0.297 million
- 2022/23: ▲0.359 million
- 2023/24: ▲0.394 million
- 2024/25: ▼0.377 million
- 2025/26: ▲0.410 million
Location
Notes
- Passenger statistics from the Office of Rail and Road

Spital railway station is a railway station serving the village of Spital in Merseyside, England which opened in September 1840. The station is located on the Wirral Line operated by Merseyrail and there are frequent third rail electric train services to Liverpool, Chester and Ellesmere Port.

== Facilities ==
The station is staffed, during all opening hours, and has platform CCTV. There is a payphone, a vending machine and a booking office. There are departure and arrival screens on the platforms for passenger information. Each of the two platforms has sheltered seating. The station has a car park, with 141 spaces, a cycle rack with 14 spaces, and a secure cycle locker with 30 spaces. Access to the station booking office is straightforward. There is no easy access for passengers with wheelchairs or prams to the platforms, as this is by staircase only.

== Services ==
Trains run to Liverpool at a frequency of approximately every 10 minutes and a service to Chester every 15 minutes on weekdays and Saturdays until late evening when the service to each destination becomes half-hourly, as it is on Sundays. Additionally there is a half-hourly service to Ellesmere Port all day, every day. Northbound trains operate via Birkenhead Hamilton Square station in Birkenhead and the Mersey Railway Tunnel to Liverpool. Southbound trains all proceed as far as Hooton, where the lines to Chester and Ellesmere Port divide. These services are all provided by Merseyrail's fleet of Class 777 EMUs.

== Gallery ==
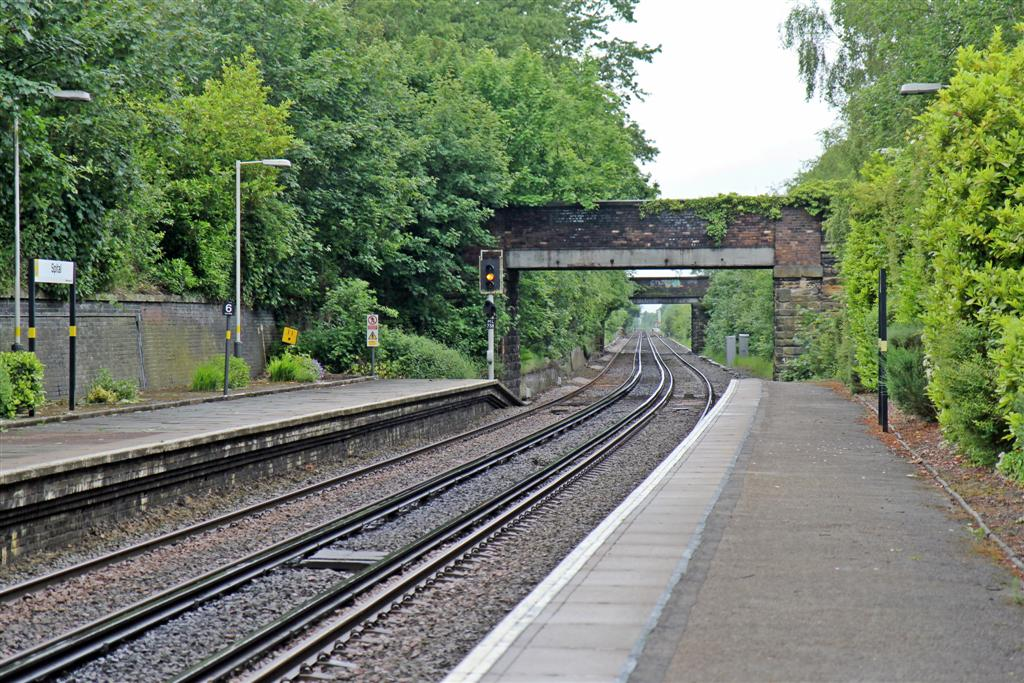
Two footbridges beyond the northern end of the station.

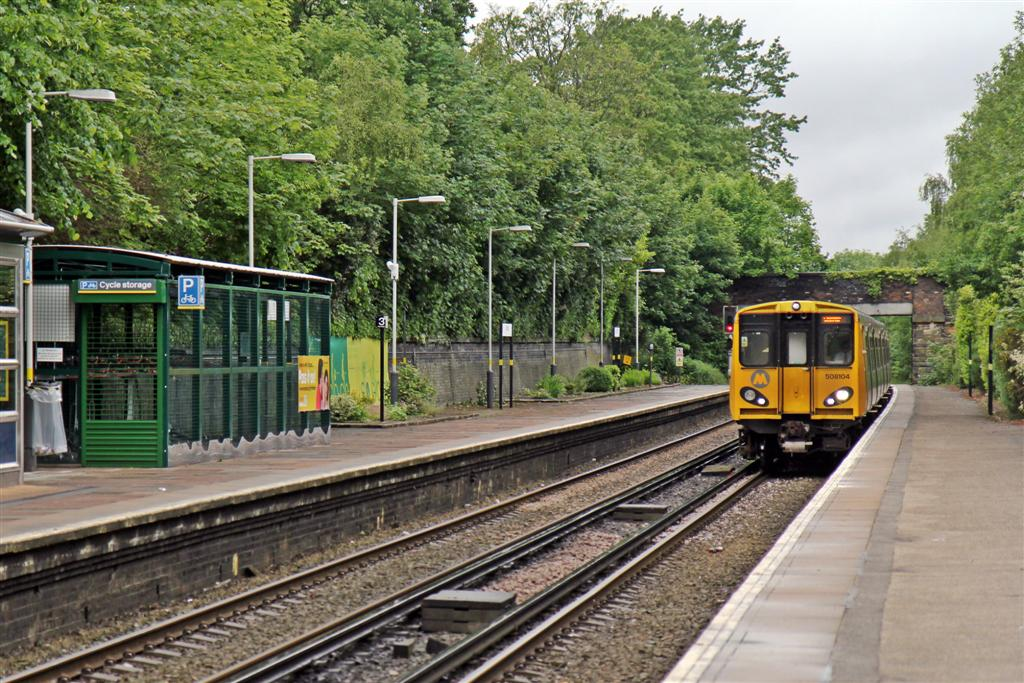
A Class 508 arrives with a service to Hooton.

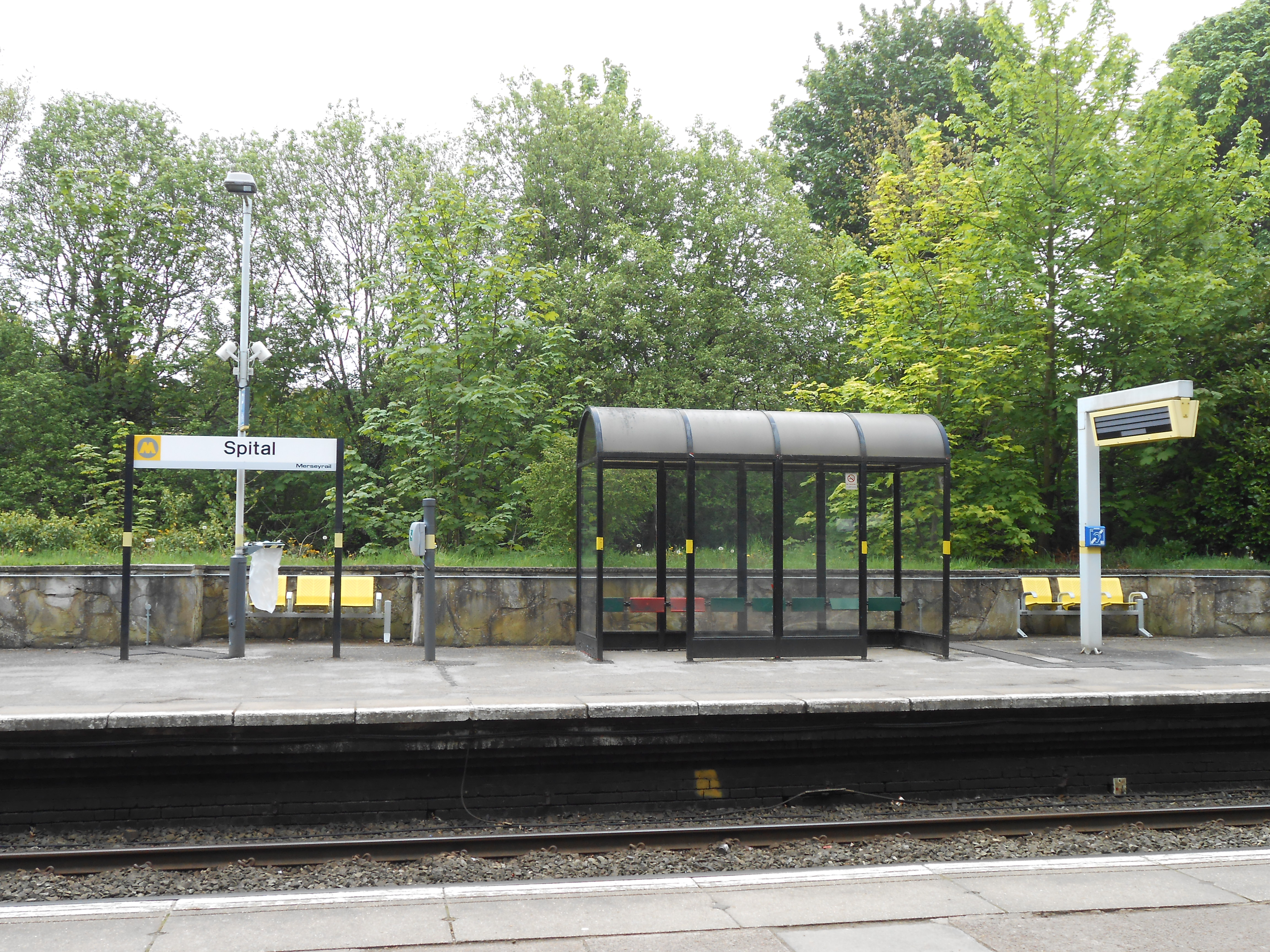
The platform furniture.

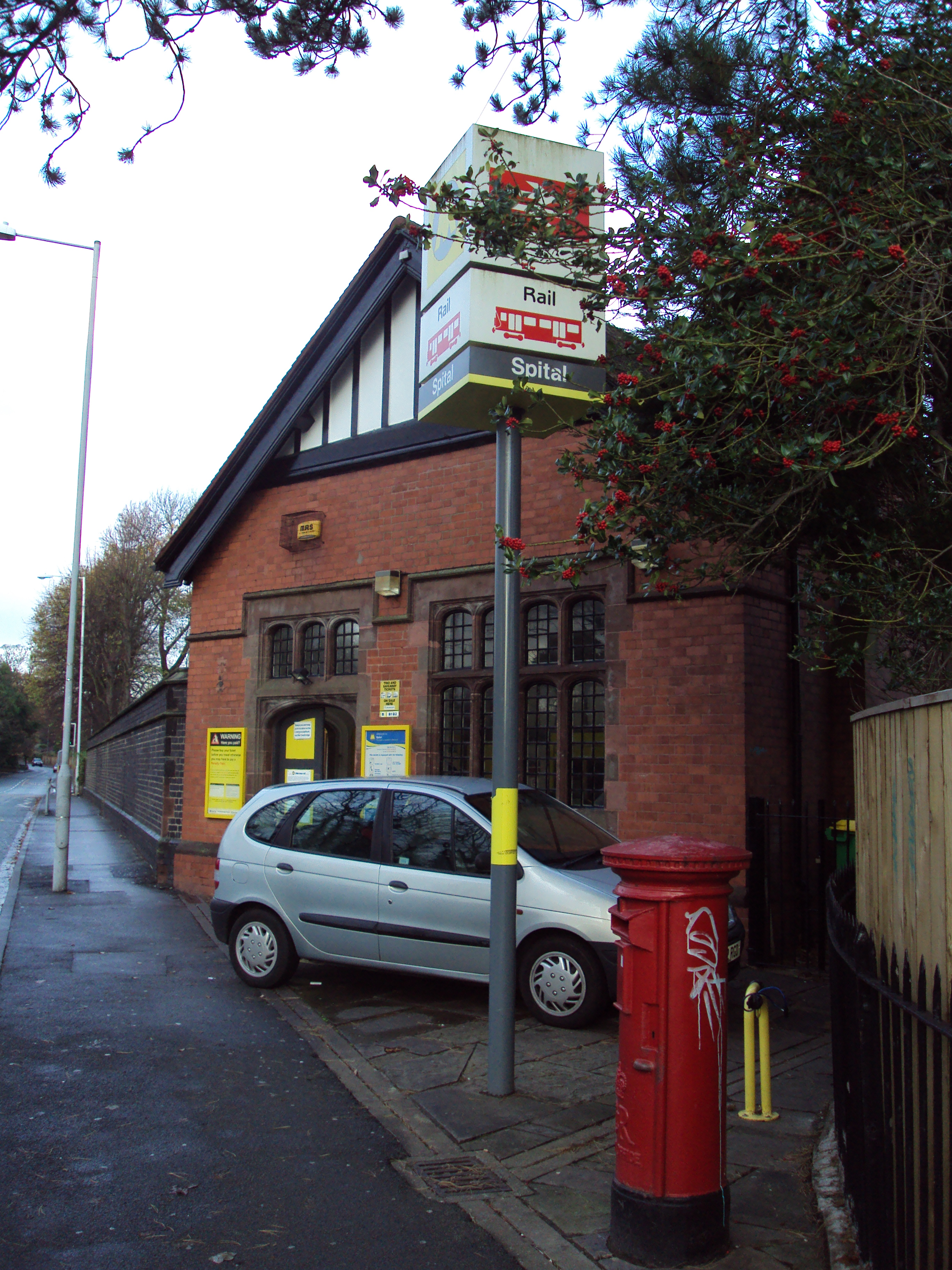
The station frontage.

Preceding station	National Rail	Following station
Bromborough Rake towards Chester or Ellesmere Port	Merseyrail; Wirral Line; Ellesmere Port/Chester	Port Sunlight towards Liverpool Central
	Historical railways	
Bromborough; Line and station open	GWR & LNWR; Chester and Birkenhead Railway	Port Sunlight; Line and station open
