= Port Sunlight railway station =

Railway station on the Chester & Ellesmere Port branches of the Wirral line in England

Port Sunlight
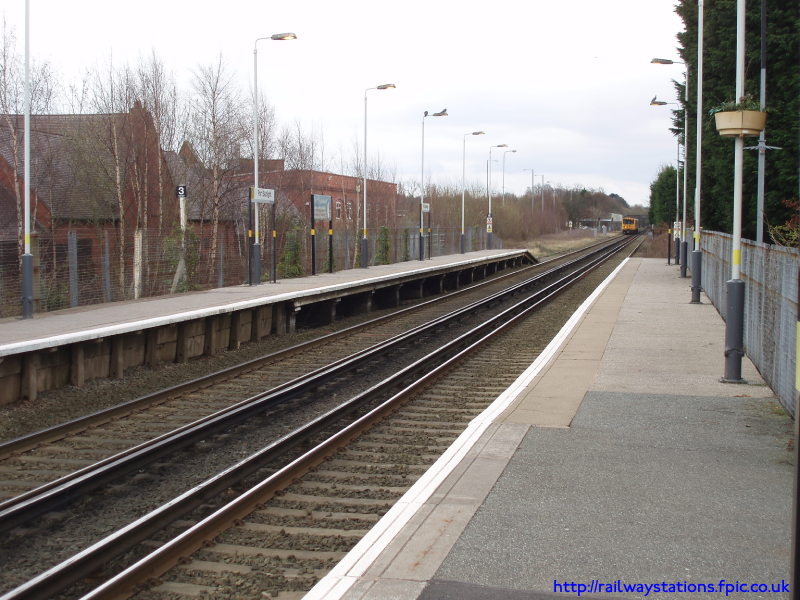

General information
- Location: Port Sunlight, Wirral; England
- Coordinates: 53°20′55″N 2°59′54″W
- Grid reference: SJ336840
- Manager: Merseyrail
- Transit authority: Merseytravel
- Platforms: 2

Other information
- Station code: PSL
- Fare zone: B1
- Classification: DfT category E

Passengers
- 2021/22: ▲0.490 million
- 2022/23: ▲0.540 million
- 2023/24: ▲0.604 million
- 2024/25: ▲0.678 million
- 2025/26: ▲0.770 million
Location
Notes
- Passenger statistics from the Office of Rail and Road

Port Sunlight railway station serves the village of Port Sunlight in Merseyside, England. The station is situated on the Chester and Ellesmere Port branches of the Wirral line, part of the Merseyrail network.

== History ==
Port Sunlight station is on the former Birkenhead Railway and opened as Port Sunlight Halt for workmen only on 1 May 1914. It became a public station (Port Sunlight) on 9 May 1927. Direct train services to Liverpool began in 1985, when the line between Rock Ferry and Hooton was electrified; previously passengers for Liverpool had to change at Rock Ferry. Further electrification in early 1990s allowed electric train services to be extended, first to Chester in 1993 and then Ellesmere Port in 1994.

== Facilities ==
The station is staffed during all opening hours, and has platform CCTV. There are toilets, a payphone, a vending machine and a booking office. There are departure and arrival screens on the platform for passenger information. Each of the two platforms has sheltered seating. The station does not have a car park, though there is roadside parking available. The station does have a cycle rack with 6 spaces, and a secure cycle locker with 60 spaces. Access to the station booking office is by a steep ramp. However, there is no easy access for passengers with wheelchairs or prams to the platforms, as this is by subway and staircase only. In 2026, the government announced that accessibility would be improved

== Services ==
Trains operate every 15 minutes between Chester and Liverpool on weekdays and Saturdays until late evening when the service becomes half-hourly, as it is on Sundays. Additionally there is a half-hourly service between Liverpool and Ellesmere Port all day, every day. Northbound trains operate via Birkenhead Hamilton Square station in Birkenhead and the Mersey Railway Tunnel to Liverpool. Southbound trains all proceed as far as Hooton, where the lines to Chester and Ellesmere Port divide. These services are all provided by Merseyrail's fleet of Class 777 EMUs.

== Gallery ==
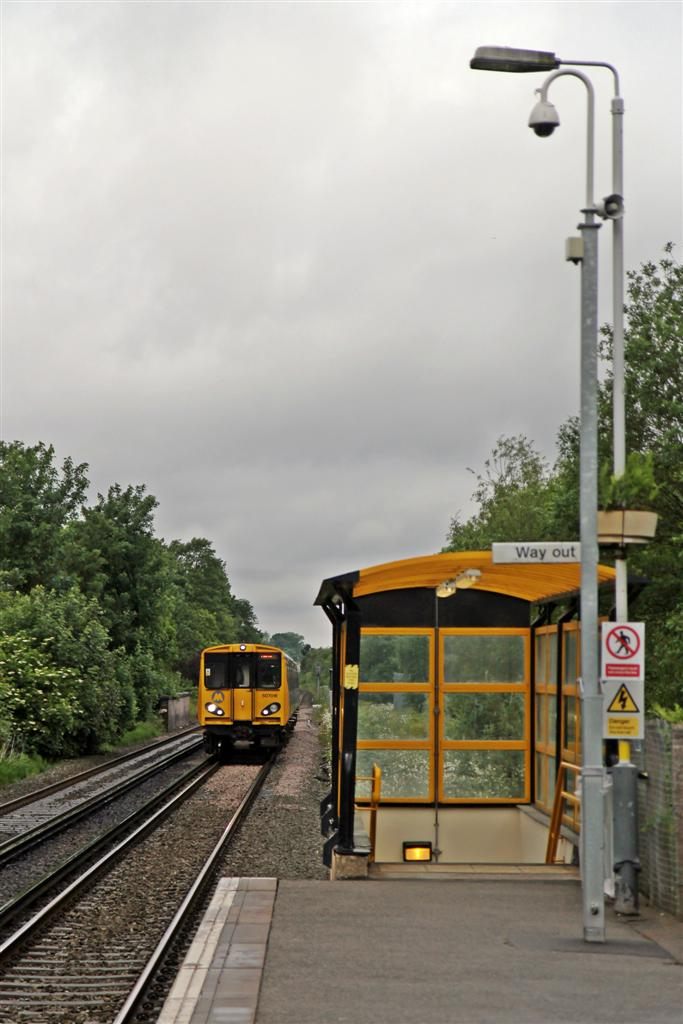
A Merseyrail Class 507 approaches the station.

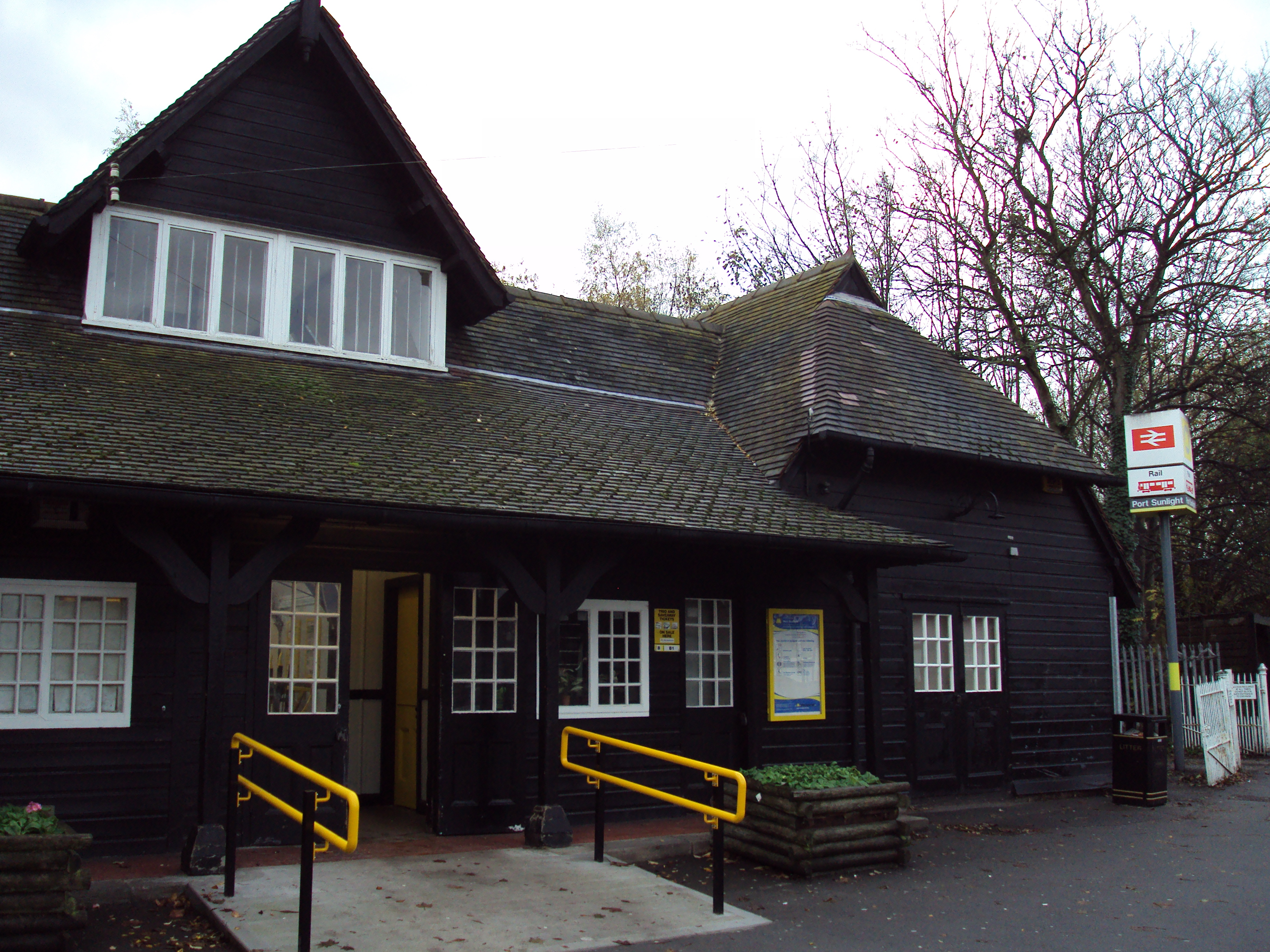
The station building, from the street.

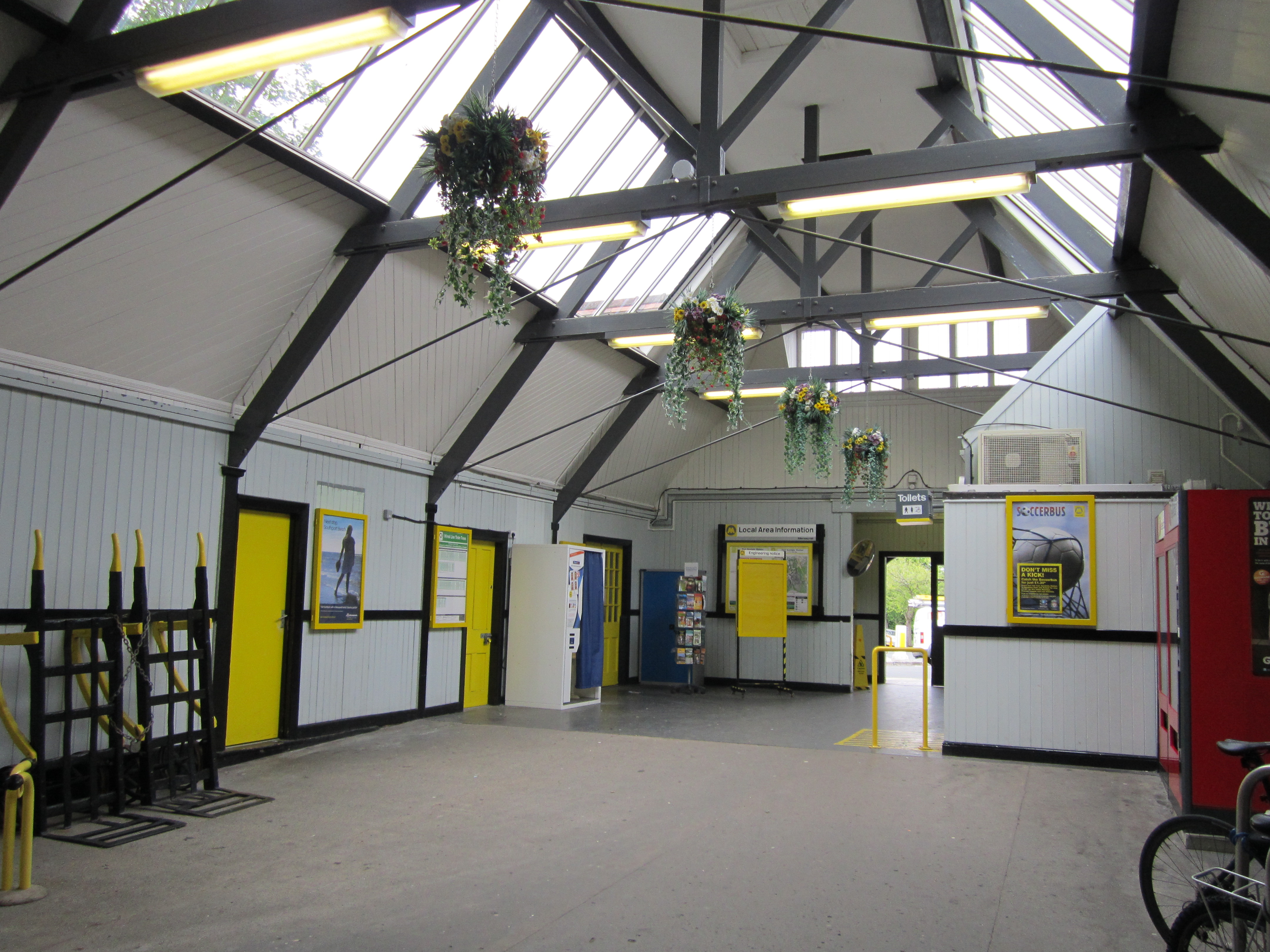
The interior of the booking hall.

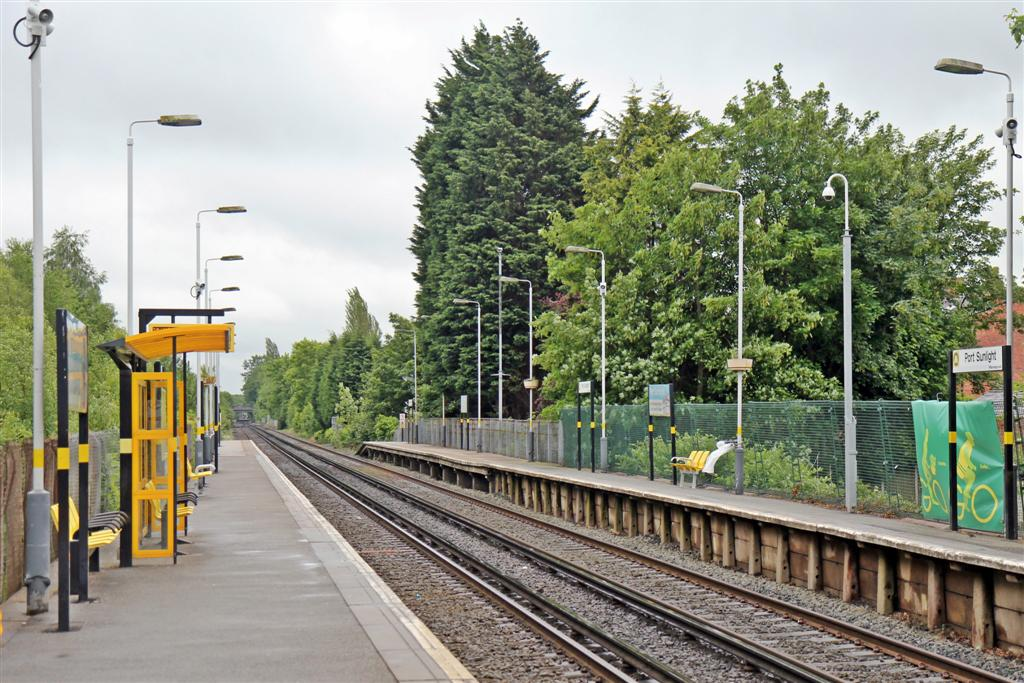
The view to the south of the station.

Preceding station	National Rail	Following station
Spital towards Chester or Ellesmere Port	Merseyrail; Wirral Line; Ellesmere Port/Chester	Bebington towards Liverpool Central
	Historical railways	
Spital; Line and station open	GWR & LNWR; Chester and Birkenhead Railway	Bebington & New Ferry; Line and station open
