= Eastham Rake railway station =

Railway station on the Chester & Ellesmere Port branches of the Wirral line in England

Eastham Rake
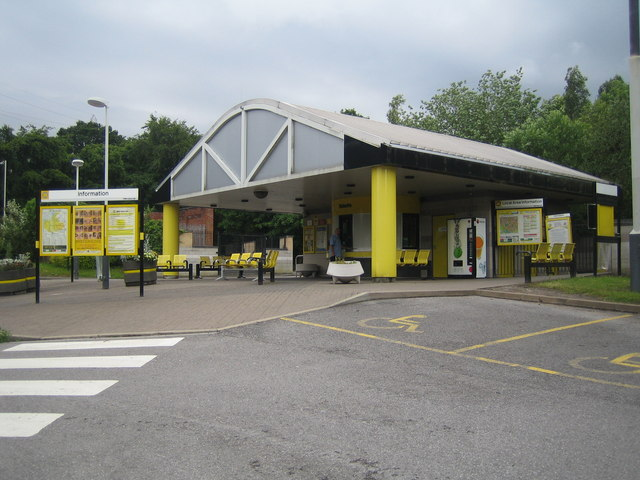

General information
- Location: Eastham, Wirral; England
- Coordinates: 53.3077°N 2.9813°W
- Grid reference: SJ347794
- Manager: Merseyrail
- Transit authority: Merseytravel
- Platforms: 2

Other information
- Station code: ERA
- Fare zone: B2
- Classification: DfT category E

Key dates
- 1995: Opened

Passengers
- 2021/22: ▲0.335 million
- 2022/23: ▲0.374 million
- 2023/24: ▲0.388 million
- 2024/25: ▼0.371 million
- 2025/26: ▲0.419 million
Location
Notes
- Passenger statistics from the Office of Rail and Road

Eastham Rake railway station is a railway station which serves the village of Eastham on the Wirral Peninsula. It is situated on the Wirral Line of the Merseyrail network 8 1/2 miles (13.7 km) south-west of Liverpool Lime Street. The station opened on 7 June 1995.

== Facilities ==
The station is staffed, during all opening hours, and has platform CCTV. There is a payphone, a vending machine and a booking office. There is an Amazon Locker at the booking office under the name 'pravin', which is accessible 24/7. There are departure and arrival screens, on the platform, for passenger information. Each of the two platforms has sheltered seating. There is a free car park with 101 spaces, a cycle rack with 6 spaces, and a secure cycle locker with 44 spaces. Access to the station booking office is on the pavement. Access to each of the two platforms is by a stepped ramp. This allows relatively easy access for passengers with wheelchairs or prams.

== Services ==
Trains operate every 15 minutes between Chester and Liverpool on weekdays and Saturdays until late evening when the service becomes half-hourly, as it is on Sundays. Additionally, there is a half-hourly service between Liverpool and Ellesmere Port all day, every day. Northbound trains operate via Birkenhead Hamilton Square station in Birkenhead and the Mersey Railway Tunnel to Liverpool. Southbound, the next station is Hooton, where the lines to Chester and Ellesmere Port divide. These services are all provided by Merseyrail's fleet of Class 777 EMUs.

== Gallery ==
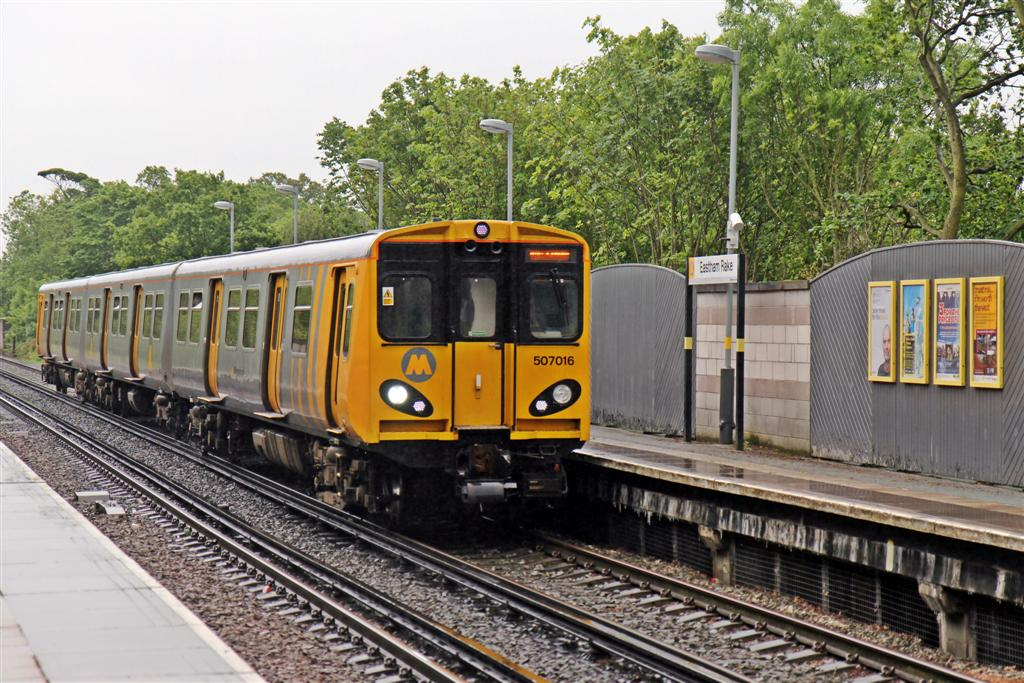
A Class 507 arrives with a service to Liverpool Central.

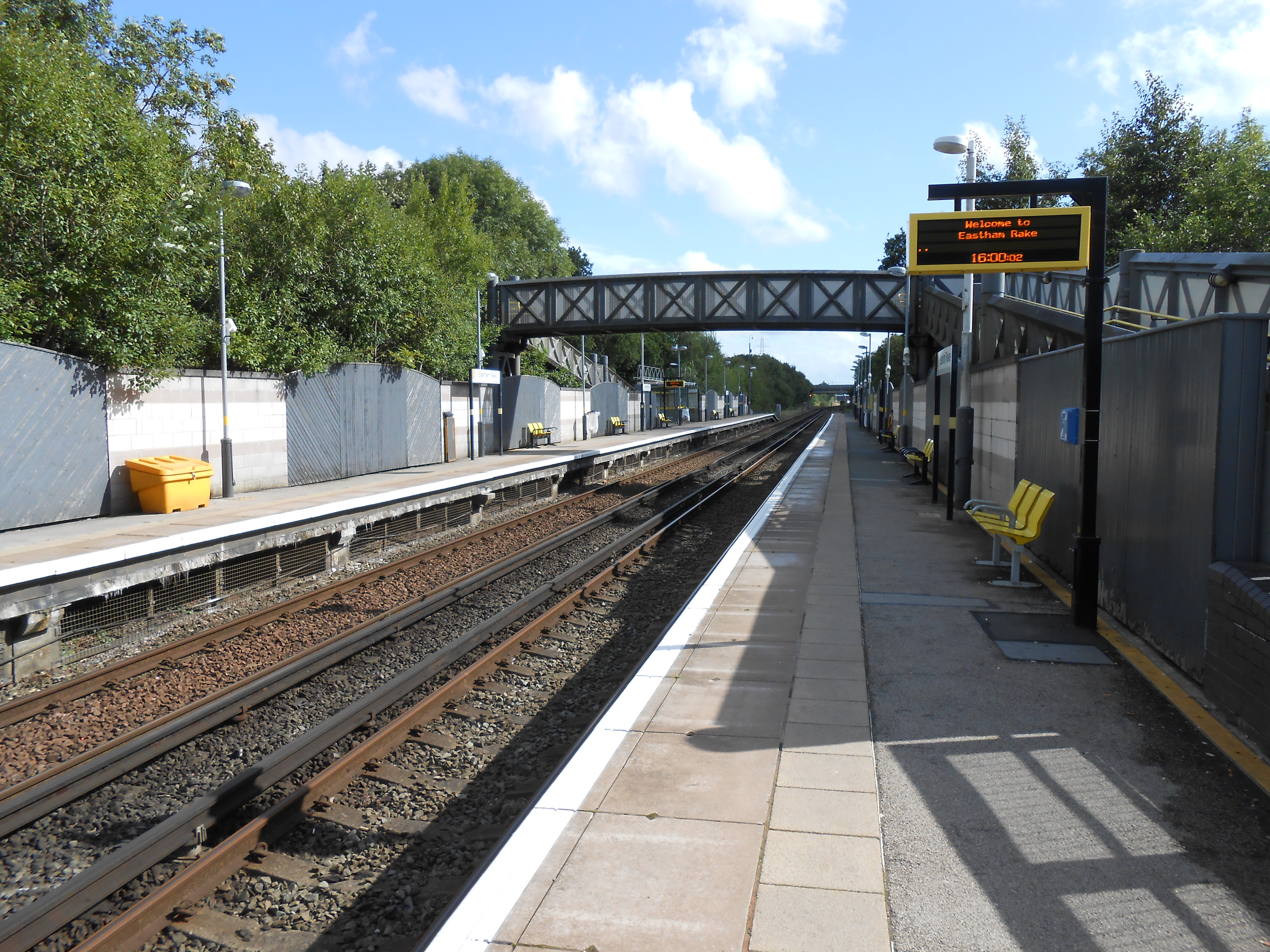
The platforms and footbridge.

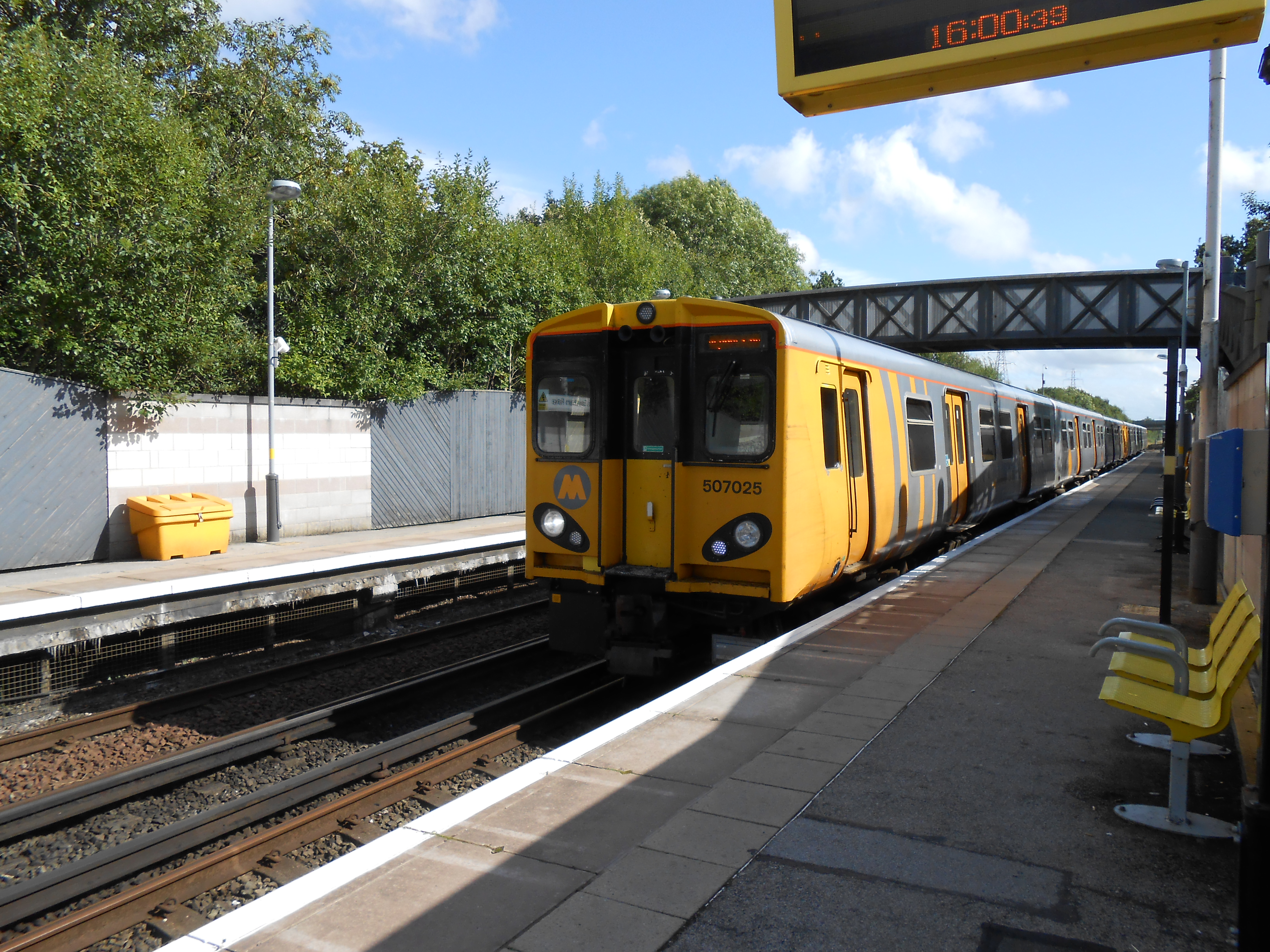
A Class 507 arrives with a service.

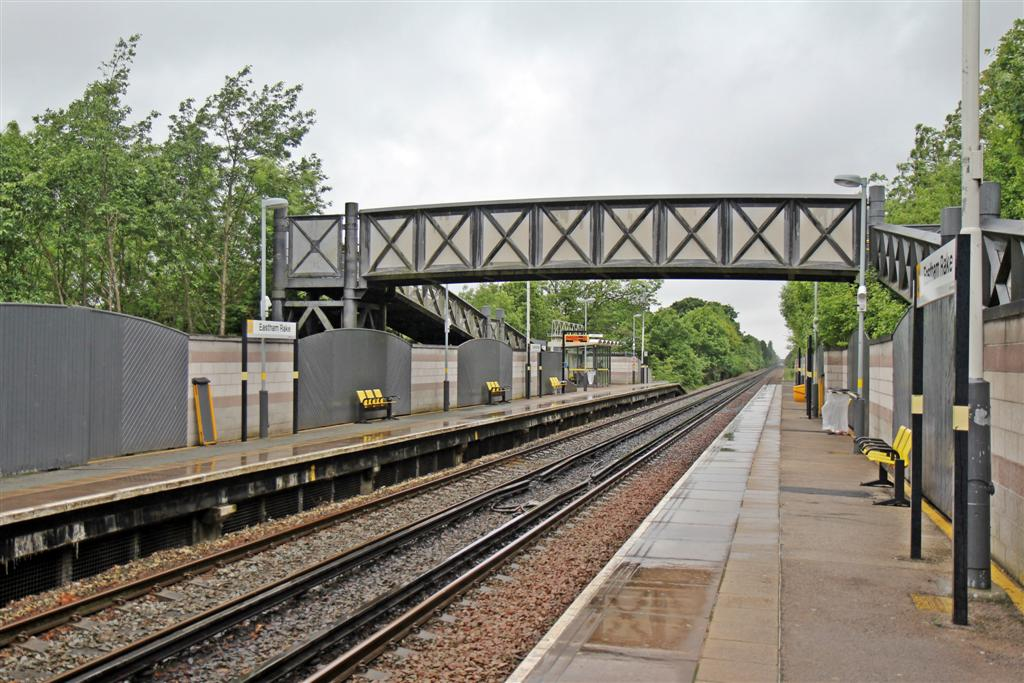
The platforms and footbridge.

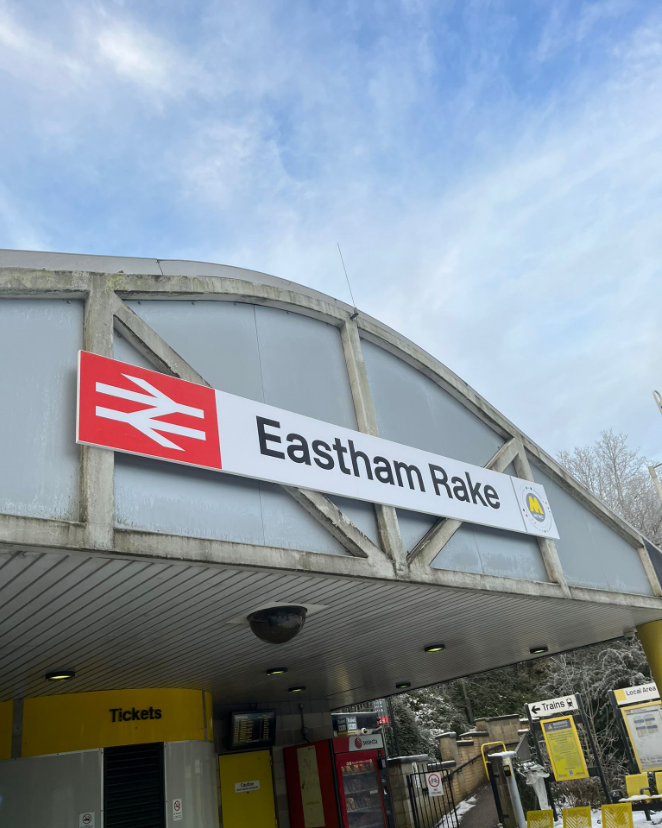
Brand-new station sign at the ticket office, fitted January 2025.

Preceding station	National Rail	Following station
Hooton towards Chester or Ellesmere Port	Merseyrail; Wirral Line	Bromborough towards Liverpool Central
