= Bromborough railway station =

Railway station on the Chester & Ellesmere Port branches of the Wirral line in England

Bromborough
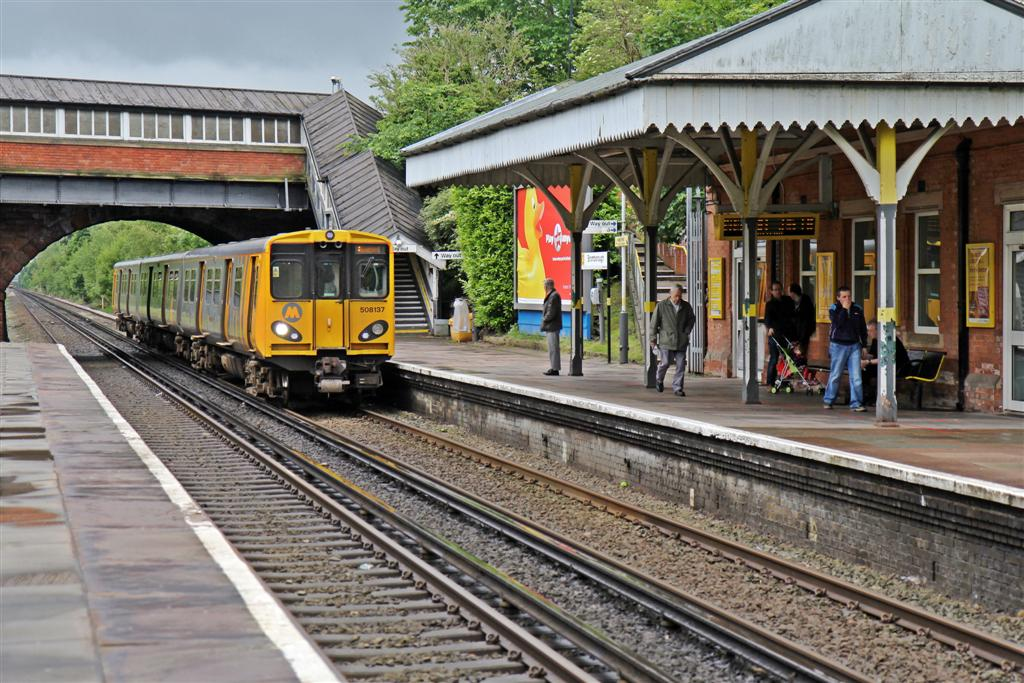

General information
- Location: Bromborough, Wirral; England
- Coordinates: 53.3218°N 2.9869°W
- Grid reference: SJ343809
- Manager: Merseyrail
- Transit authority: Merseytravel
- Platforms: 2

Other information
- Station code: BOM
- Fare zone: B2
- Classification: DfT category E

History
- Opened: 1841

Passengers
- 2021/22: ▲0.441 million
- 2022/23: ▲0.527 million
- 2023/24: ▲0.579 million
- 2024/25: ▼0.531 million
- 2025/26: ▲0.571 million
Location
Notes
- Passenger statistics from the Office of Rail and Road

Bromborough railway station is one of two stations serving the town of Bromborough in Merseyside, England. The station is situated on the Chester and Ellesmere Port branches of the Wirral Line, part of the Merseyrail network.

== History ==
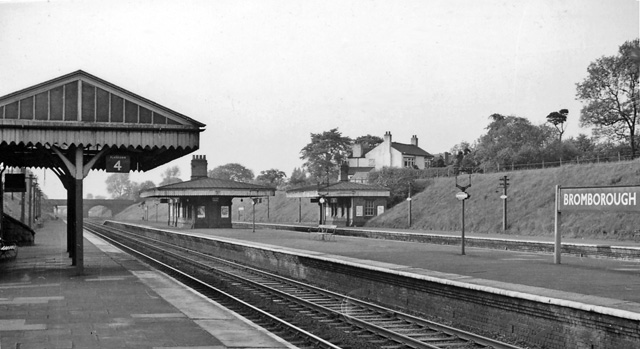
View southward, towards Chester in 1961

The station is on the former Chester and Birkenhead Railway, which opened in 1840. The station itself opened in 1841.

Direct train services to Liverpool began in 1985, when the line between Rock Ferry and Hooton was electrified; previously passengers for Liverpool had to change at Rock Ferry. Further electrification by British Rail in early 1990s allowed electric train services to be extended, first to Chester in 1993 and then Ellesmere Port in 1994.

The station is almost identical in architecture and layout to neighbouring Spital.

== Facilities ==
The station is staffed, during all opening hours, and has platform CCTV. There is a vending machine and a booking office. There are departure screens by the ticket office and on the platforms, and a payphone outside. Each of the two platforms has sheltered seating. There is a free car park with 136 spaces (following 2021 extension), which is across Allport Road, a cycle rack with 8 spaces, and a secure cycle locker with 76 spaces. Access to the station booking office from Allport Road is straightforward. Access to each of the two platforms is by stepped ramp or staircase. A £1 million refurbishment of the station footbridge, which began in March 2019, was completed in December 2020.

== Services ==
Trains operate every 15 minutes between Chester and Liverpool on weekdays and Saturdays until late evening when the service becomes half-hourly, as it is on Sundays. Additionally there is a half-hourly service between Liverpool and Ellesmere Port all day, every day. Northbound trains operate via Birkenhead Hamilton Square station in Birkenhead and the Mersey Railway Tunnel to Liverpool. Southbound trains all proceed as far as Hooton, where the lines to Chester and Ellesmere Port divide. These services are all provided by Merseyrail's fleet of Class 777 EMUs.

Preceding station	National Rail	Following station
Eastham Rake towards Chester or Ellesmere Port	Merseyrail; Wirral Line; Ellesmere Port/Chester	Bromborough Rake towards Liverpool Central
	Historical railways	
Hooton; Line and station open	GWR & LNWR; Chester and Birkenhead Railway	Spital; Line and station open
