= Yoonew =

Yoonew, Inc.
- Type: Web Start-up
- Industry: Ticketing
- Founded: 2004
- Defunct: February 1, 2010
- Headquarters: New York, New York, USA
- Key people: Gerry Wilson, co-founder, CEO; Hagos Mehreteab, co-founder, President
- Products: Sports Ticket Derivatives; Sports Tickets

Yoonew, Inc., stylized as yoonew, was a start-up based in New York City, USA, that ran an online exchange specializing in championship sports tickets and ticket derivatives. Since being founded in 2004, Yoonew provided tickets and ticket derivatives for large sporting events such as the Super Bowl, the World Series, the Stanley Cup, the UEFA European Football Championship, the Final Four and the US Open.

== History ==
Yoonew Inc. was founded in September 2004 by MIT Sloan students Gerry Wilson and Hagos Mehreteab in hopes of creating a method by which die-hard fans without thousands of dollars to spare could get their hands on cheap tickets to major sporting events. The idea was born when Wilson was unable to obtain affordable tickets to the 2003 World Series. After the idea fared well in a couple of business-plan competitions, Wilson and Mehreteab, a longtime friend, launched the company.

The company experienced difficulties early as co-founder Wilson was forced to liquidate his 401(k) in order to provide customers with 2005 NCAA Final Four college basketball tickets in 2005. After struggling initially, Yoonew was able to raise $2 million in investments and began to grow. In October 2007, Yoonew changed its interface to provide real-time price plotting similar to that seen on Yahoo! and Google. A point of contention raised regarding the new interface was that it was too heavily geared towards traders, which reduces usability for the average user.

To make the site more accessible for the average user, Yoonew launches in July 2008, Yoonew Direct a new interface in Adobe Flash which complements the existing interface (Yoonew Exchange). Users having an account on Yoonew Exchange can use the same account to log in Yoonew Direct and vice versa. In addition, products purchased on Yoonew Direct can be traded on the Yoonew Exchange. At the same time, Yoonew launched a new feature which allows users to place orders for exact seat (defined by a section, row and seat) unlike the other events where users can only choose the seating category (usually five). At the moment, this feature is only available for the US Open 2008. This company is now out of business.

== How it worked ==
If a fan believes his favorite team will reach the championship game, he can purchase ticket futures months in advance at a low prices which are market-based. If the team actually makes it to the big game, the fan is guaranteed tickets. If the team is eliminated and the holder has not re-sold their contract, they lose their investment.

Yoonew offers three types of contracts:

- A Team Fantasy Seat for a given team and a given event which entitles the owner the ticket to the event if the team makes it to the event;
- A Matchup Fantasy Seat for a given matchup and a given event which entitles the owner the ticket to the event if both teams of the matchup makes it to the event;
- A Ticket for a given event.

If Matchup Fantasy Seat are riskier than Team Fantasy Seat, they are also much cheaper. During the playoff, the Fantasy Seats of eliminated teams get expired and are removed from their owner's portfolios. When a team becomes a finalist, the Team Fantasy Seat for the team is converted into a ticket. When both teams of a matchup become finalist, the Matchup Fantasy Seats are converted into tickets. The owners of such Fantasy Seats can choose either to sell the ticket on the exchange for a profit or keeps it to go to the game.

For example, in 2006, sports fan Joe Kocott bought 18 futures contracts for the Pittsburgh Steelers making the Super Bowl at an average of $185 each. When the Steelers eventually made it to the Super Bowl, he was delivered the tickets, which were selling at around $2,500 each at the time.

In 2007, a systems analyst paid $537 apiece for two futures contracts for the New England Patriots for upper-deck seats at University of Phoenix Stadium in Arizona. Since the Patriots made it to the Super Bowl, he ends up with two tickets for the Super Bowl XLII.

For Super Bowl XLII, a consumer could have had got a ticket for only $86 had he bought a team fantasy seat for the Giants one month before the big game.

More recently in 2008, Craig Cox, an associate professor at Texas Tech's School of Pharmacy bought two Matchup Fantasy Seats for the Steelers and Cardinals at the lower level for the Super Bowl XLIII for only $29.70 apiece one month before the NFL playoff. As both teams made it to the big game, he received two tickets and went to the game with his brother.

On the other hand, if a trader believes that a team will unlikely make it to the championship game, he can short the Fantasy Seat. To make sure that the short is covered, Yoonew required that the trader owns a ticket. With one ticket to the Super Bowl for instance, the trader can short up to 16 Team Fantasy Seats (one for each team of the AFC conference or one for each team of the NFC conference). If the trader shorts a Team Fantasy Seat for a team which gets eliminated, she earns the amount at which she shorted the Fantasy Seat. However, in the "unfortunate" case the team makes it to the final, she loses her ticket.

== End of business ==
On February 1, 2010, Yoonew ceased operations. Yoonew personally called its users on 31 January 2010 to make the announcement and notify customers that Yoonew would not be able to deliver Super Bowl 2010 tickets to customers who owned valid futures for that event. In the phone call, Yoonew indicated that they could not fulfill Super Bowl tickets because the macroeconomic crisis forced the bank responsible for its merchant account to go bankrupt and they had not paid Yoonew the money it was owed for its credit card deposits. Yoonew also indicated that they were in litigation with The Ticket Reserve. In understanding that by not delivering the tickets to its customers that there would be no hope for repairing market confidence, Yoonew was forced to end its business. Yoonew promised to return the money its customers paid for their winning Super Bowl 2010 Fantasy Seats. On January 31, 2010, Yoonew decommissioned its forum and blog and directed all inquiries to its email.

== See also ==
- Ticket resale
