= Sports ticket derivative =

A sports ticket derivative is a type of futures contract specifically for sports tickets. Typical terms of a ticket future contract stipulate that a ticket to a specific game (typically a championship game, such as Super Bowl or World Series) is delivered to the holder of the contract contingent on a specific team making it to that event. Ticket futures were first offered by Yoonew in 2004, under the title of Team Fantasy Seats.

== History ==
Sports ticket futures were first offered in 2004 by Yoonew. They came in the form of Team Fantasy Seats which allowed investors and fans to buy a contract for a Super Bowl or NCAA Final Four ticket contingent on a specific team reaching the event.

== See also ==
- Futures contract
- Futures exchange
- Ticket resale
