= Hooton railway station =

Railway station on the Chester & Ellesmere Port branches of the Wirral line in England

Hooton
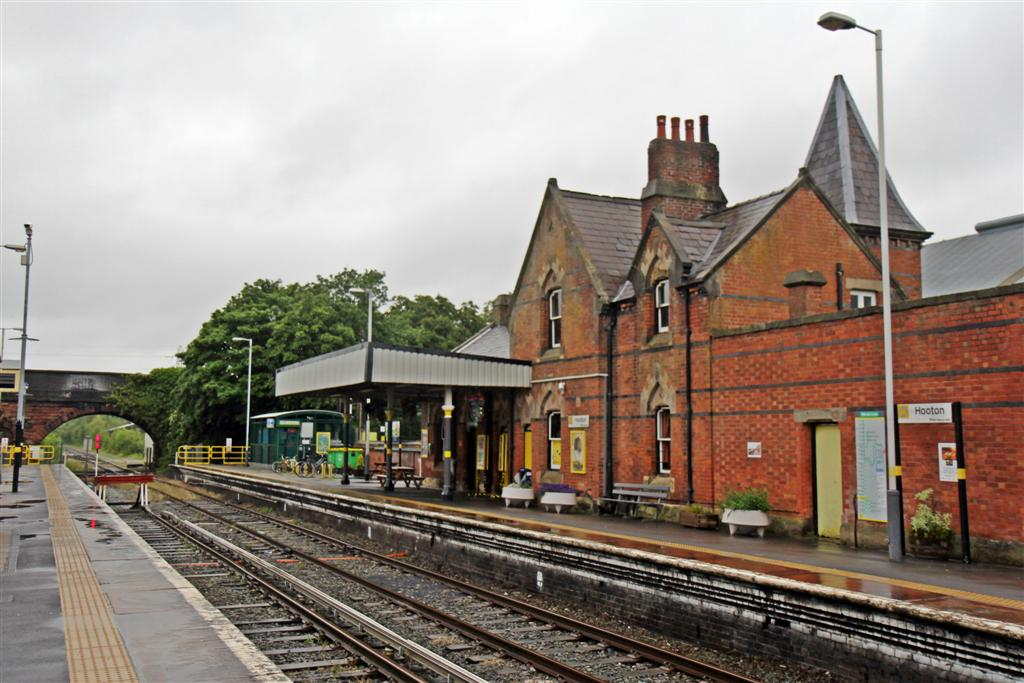
- The booking office.

General information
- Location: Hooton, Cheshire West and Chester; England
- Coordinates: 53.297°N 2.977°W
- Grid reference: SJ349782
- Managed by: Merseyrail
- Transit authority: Merseytravel
- Lines: Chester–Birkenhead; Hooton–Helsby; Hooton–West Kirby (disused)
- Platforms: 4 (only 2 see regular use)

Other information
- Station code: HOO
- Fare zone: B2/G1
- Classification: DfT category E

Key dates
- 23 September 1840: Opened
- 30 September 1985: Electrified from Rock Ferry
- 7 October 1993: Electrified to Chester
- 29 May 1994: Electrified to Ellesmere Port

Passengers
- 2020/21: ▼0.148 million
- Interchange: ▼31,436
- 2021/22: ▲0.472 million
- Interchange: ▲70,875
- 2022/23: ▲0.630 million
- Interchange: ▲98,009
- 2023/24: ▲0.757 million
- Interchange: ▲108,876
- 2024/25: ▼0.730 million
- Interchange: ▼94,154
Location
Notes
- Passenger statistics from the Office of Rail and Road

Hooton railway station is situated in the south of the Wirral Peninsula, Cheshire, England. It lies on the Wirral Line 8 miles (13 km) north of Chester and 9 1/2 miles (15.3 km) south west of Liverpool Lime Street on the Merseyrail network, and is the junction of the branch from the Chester line to Ellesmere Port. It serves the villages of Hooton and Willaston.

The station is midway between Junction 5 of the M53 motorway and Willaston village. It provides a major park and ride facility for Birkenhead, Liverpool and Chester, being convenient of access from north east Wales by the A550. The station car park contains compliant blue badge parking spaces; a variable height counter and new cycle parking were provided in 2007. Network Rail has installed a DDA compliant structure to replace the original footbridge, with lifts to all platforms; it was completed at the end of January 2011, making Hooton a wholly 'disabled friendly' station. An 'M to Go' shop was opened in March 2010. Improvements to the station also include new waiting rooms on platforms and fully accessible toilet facilities.

Hooton on the Wirral Line

== History ==
Hooton station is located on the former Birkenhead Railway, a joint railway owned by the Great Western Railway and the London and North Western Railway. The station was opened by the Chester and Birkenhead Railway, a constituent of the Birkenhead Railway, on 23 September 1840 and became, until 1967, the northern end of the GWR's main line from London Paddington to Birkenhead Woodside.

A branch from Hooton to Helsby via Ince & Elton opened on 1 July 1863, and another branch to Parkgate (later extended to West Kirby) followed on 1 October 1866. In its heyday, the station had seven platforms. The West Kirby branch closed to passengers in 1956 and completely in 1962. The branch line trains frequently comprised a train of LMS coaches hauled by a GWR tank engine; there was also a gas-lit 'motor train' with a driver's compartment at the end of the carriage used when the train was running with the engine at the rear. The service to Helsby has been replaced by a couple of diesel "parliamentary" services between Ellesmere Port and Warrington Bank Quay, thus no longer serving Hooton; however the platform sign at Ince & Elton still displays Hooton and Helsby as the termini. The line connecting the former Birkenhead Railway with the Cheshire Lines Committee Railway at Mouldsworth via Helsby & Alvanley (east of the former wire works, now Tesco) has been abandoned since 1991.

Hooton's architecture is in the style of the Birkenhead Joint Railway, the brick-built station buildings being similar to those at Hadlow Road which date from 1866, rather than the rough-hewn Gothic style used at Little Sutton and Ellesmere Port stations from 1863. The original 1839 Birkenhead Railway was single track and few if any relics remain today along the route which was doubled in 1847 and widened to four tracks in 1891. The signalling and the signal boxes of Hooton North, a 90-lever box which closed on 9 December 1973, and Hooton South, a 128 and then 80-lever box which closed on 18 May 1985 and now replaced with a modern structure, were distinctly L&NWR. However, in spite of some local L&NWR (later LMS) trains and locomotives, it was very much Great Western territory - situated as it is near the end of the main line which earned that railway its major profits, even though it did not serve the rather more glamorous destinations with which the GWR liked to be, and generally is, associated.

=== Long-distance passenger services ===
From the 1850s until their withdrawal in 1967 there were regular through trains daily between London Paddington and Birkenhead Woodside, including a sleeper train, all of which were scheduled to call at Hooton: these trains carried boards along their carriage sides proclaiming "PADDINGTON BIRMINGHAM SHREWSBURY CHESTER & BIRKENHEAD". Between Birkenhead and Chester they would always be hauled by fast, powerful tank engines; between Chester and Wolverhampton a "Castle" would typically haul the train, and between Wolverhampton and Paddington a "King" (in the final years it would have been a Western Region diesel hydraulic). Each morning there was a train to Bournemouth (West) and a three-portion train, of green carriages provided by the Southern Region on alternate days, which travelled via Oxford and Reading to Redhill, where the Brighton portion was detached, thence to Ashford where it was split into a portion for Margate, and another for Dover, Deal and Sandwich. The summer timetable would typically include services to and from destinations on the Cambrian Railways reached via Ruabon and Dolgelly (as Dolgellau was spelt by the railways at the time).

=== Goods and parcels ===
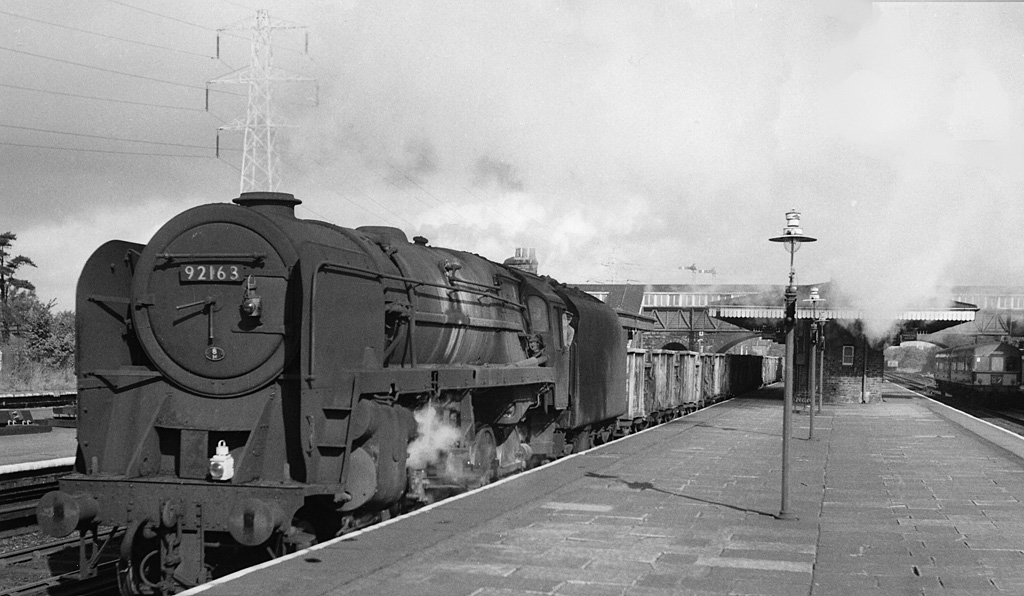
The station in 1965 with an Up empties train

There was a cattle mart opposite the station, in use until the 1960s, with railway access parallel to the bay platform, then numbered Platform 1. Milk trains bound for the Black Country, Birmingham and London along the Great Western Main Line were assembled each evening on the then extensive sidings, and there was an extensive traffic of live cattle. Mr Parton of the Station Garage provided a taxi service with two luxurious black Packard limousines. Nowadays commercial premises occupy the site of the garage and the mart.

Hooton handled a substantial trade in railway goods and parcels; even unaccompanied dogs (crated) could be sent in the care of the Guard who would attend to their needs en route. In the 1950s luggage was conveyed PLA (Passengers' Luggage in Advance): if collected by the station lorry, transported and delivered the charge for a trunk was five shillings, if simply transported and delivered the charge was three shillings and ninepence. Among the passengers were frequently crates of homing pigeons: young ones might be sent only as far as Gobowen or Wellington for release by station staff, whilst more experienced birds were sent for release at destinations all over the former Great Western system, and indeed to Europe.

=== 1970s decline ===
Until the late 1960s there were waiting rooms and lavatories for ladies and gentlemen (with penny slots in the cubicle doors) on both island platforms and on Platform 2, the signs on Platform 6 being suspended from hooks for easy removal on those occasions when the Royal Train overnighted at Hooton. Wymans had a newspaper and bookstall until the late 1960s, but there was never a refreshment room. When the LMR's West Coast Main Line electric services to Liverpool commenced in 1967 the Great Western main line was reduced in status to a series of local lines, Birkenhead Woodside was closed and Hooton station went into decline. The Joyce of Whitchurch clock was removed, the canopies and buildings were removed from the island platforms in the 1970s, and the only services comprised DMUs running between Rock Ferry (by then the terminus) and either Chester or Helsby. For a very short period during the 1970s even the sparse Sunday services between Chester and Rock Ferry stopped only at Bromborough and omitted Hooton.

=== Electrification and the Wirral Line ===
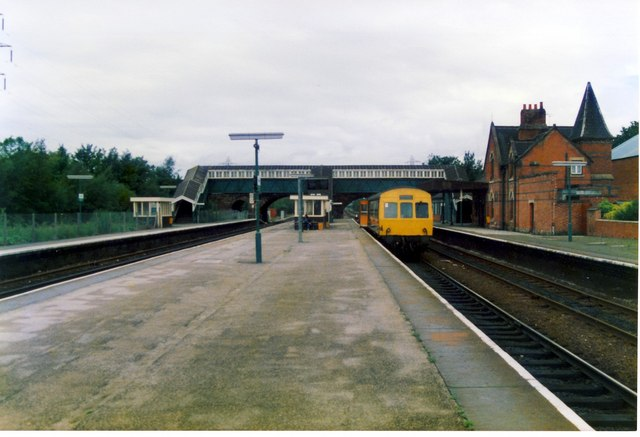
A British Rail Class 101 DMU at Hooton, bound for Chester or Helsby, in 1989. The newly electrified line from Liverpool served the other side of the island platform.

Through services to Liverpool began on 30 September 1985 when the line between Rock Ferry and Hooton was electrified becoming a part of Merseyrail's Wirral Line. Previously passengers for Liverpool changed at Rock Ferry. Hooton then became a temporary interchange station for passengers from Chester and Ellesmere Port to Liverpool. Further electrification work saw the Merseyrail Wirral Line extend to Chester in 1993 and Ellesmere Port in 1994. The station transformed into a through station.

=== 21st century ===
The present overbridge and lift shafts were brought into use at the end of January 2011; they are situated to the south of the station buildings and further down the platforms than the previous footbridge at the north end of the station. That footbridge, demolished in February 2011, dated from the widening of the line from two to four tracks from Ledsham Junction to Rock Ferry in 1891, the additional tracks being another casualty of the 1970s. The previous footbridge discharged its users short of the canopies on the then platforms 2, 3 & 4, 5 & 6; the canopies were demolished in the 1970s as a result of BR's "discounted cash flow" policy which held that it was more economical to eliminate an asset than to retain it and the continuing maintenance obligation.

== Services ==
Trains between Chester and Liverpool operate every 15 minutes in each direction during weekdays, every 30 minutes in the evening and on Sundays. The Ellesmere Port/Liverpool service runs every 15 minutes during Monday-Friday peak hours and every 30 minutes at other times. These services are all provided by Merseyrail's fleet of Class 777 EMUs.

Platform 3 serves northbound trains. Platform 2 serves trains for Chester and Ellesmere Port and its opposite face is Platform 1, a south-facing bay platform with electrified track used primarily for stabling. These platforms are all accessed by the overbridge/lifts.

The booking office gives onto the fourth platform which is un-numbered; it was originally Platform 2 and is used primarily for loco-hauled rail-tour trains starting from and terminating at Hooton. The line serving it is not electrified, reverts to double track north of the road bridge, and continues northbound for some three-quarters of a mile.

The original Platform 1, a bay serving the former Helsby branch adjacent to original Platform 2, has disappeared with re-modelling. Platform 7 was used by trains from the West Kirby branch bound for Birkenhead and lies abandoned and heavily overgrown, as is original Platform 6 which would form the other face of the present Platform 3 (formerly Platform 5) but for a central fence erected at the time of the re-modelling.

== Gallery ==
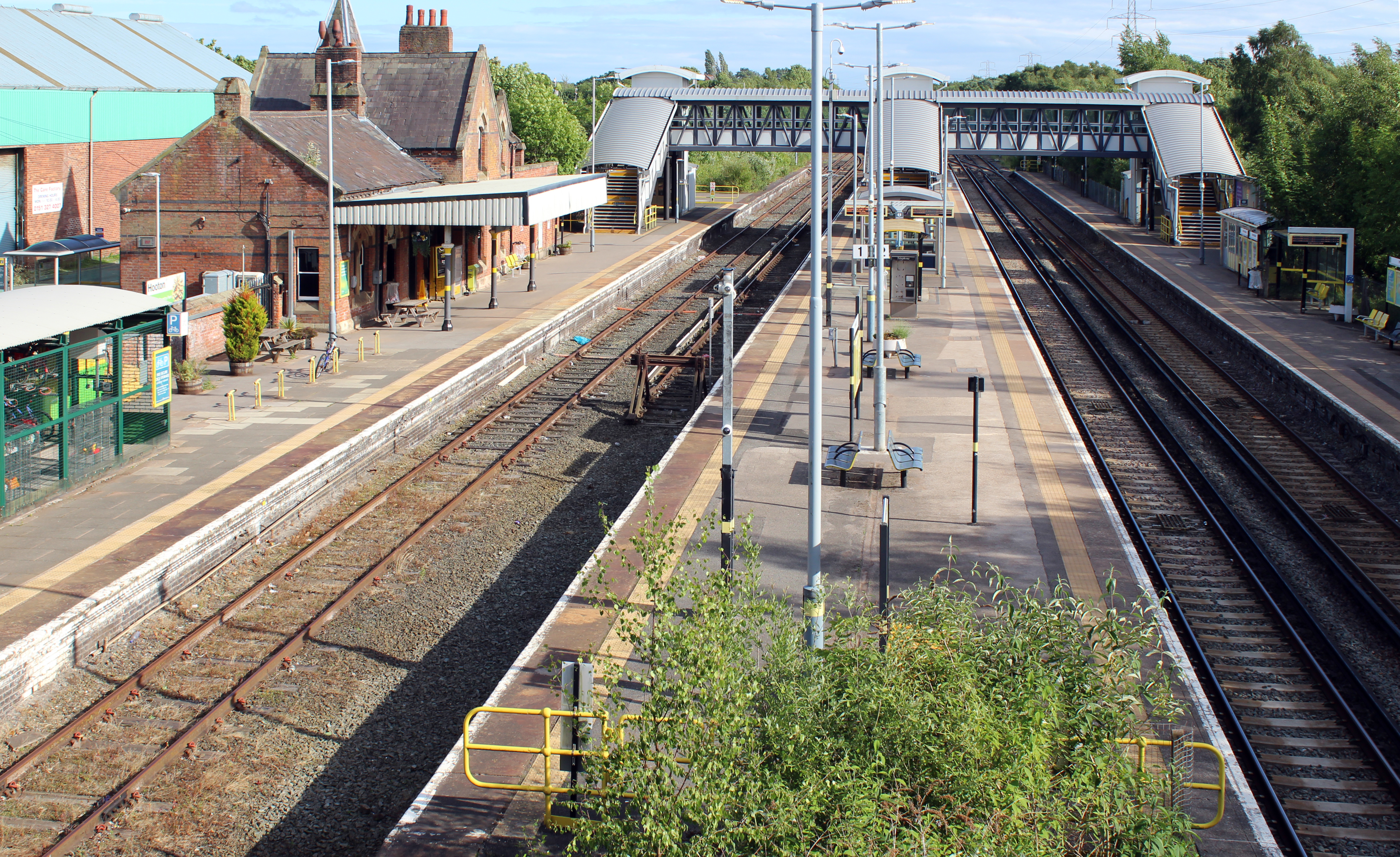
Overview from Hooton Road bridge

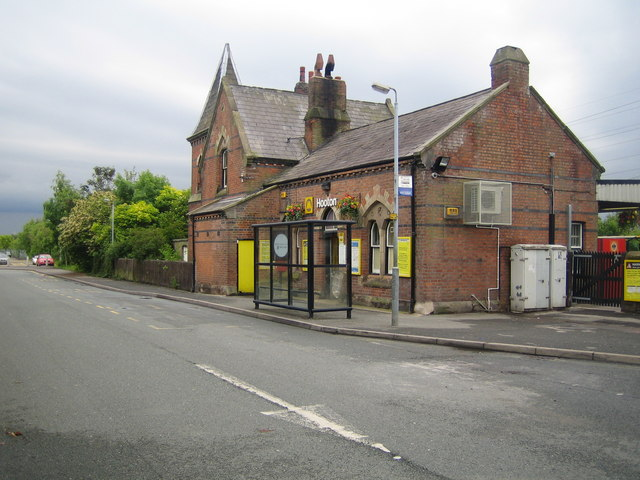
The station building, seen from its access road.

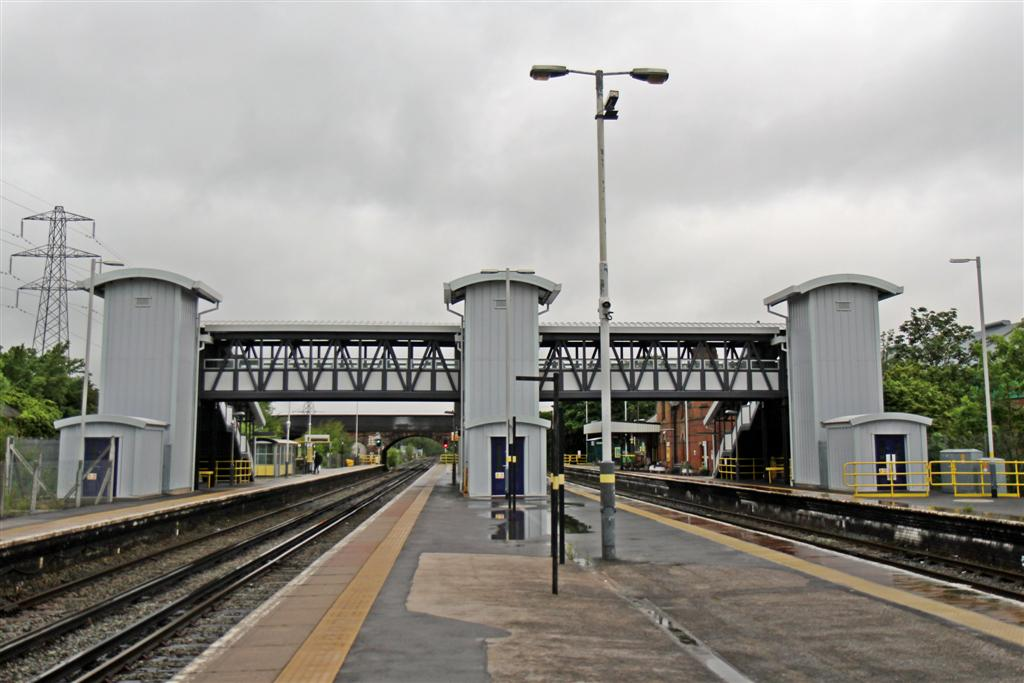
The new footbridge at Hooton, looking north.

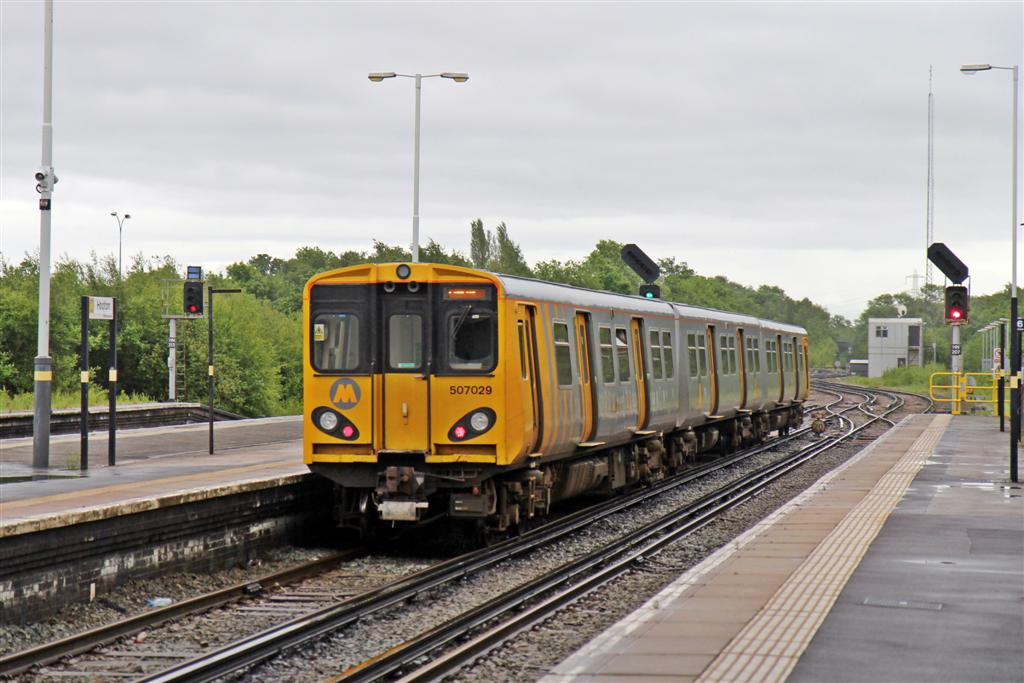
A Merseyrail Class 507 departs from Hooton, heading for Chester.

Preceding station	National Rail	Following station
Capenhurst or Bache towards Chester	Merseyrail; Wirral Line; Chester Branch	Eastham Rake towards Liverpool Central
Little Sutton towards Ellesmere Port	Merseyrail; Wirral Line; Ellesmere Port Branch	Eastham Rake towards Liverpool Central
	Historical railways	
Ledsham; Line open, station closed	GWR & LNWR; Chester and Birkenhead Railway	Bromborough; Line and station open
	Disused railways	
Hadlow Road	Birkenhead Railway	Bromborough
