= Ticket (admission) =

Paper or cardboard document showing payment for access to an event or service

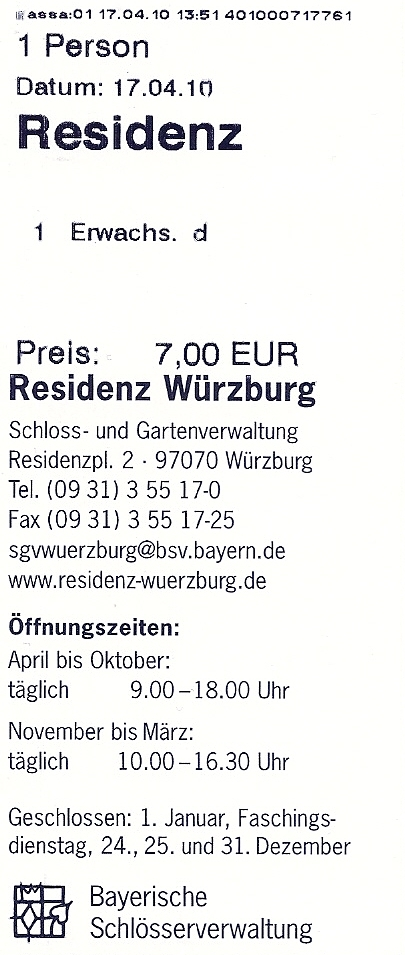
German admission ticket for Würzburg Residence (2010)

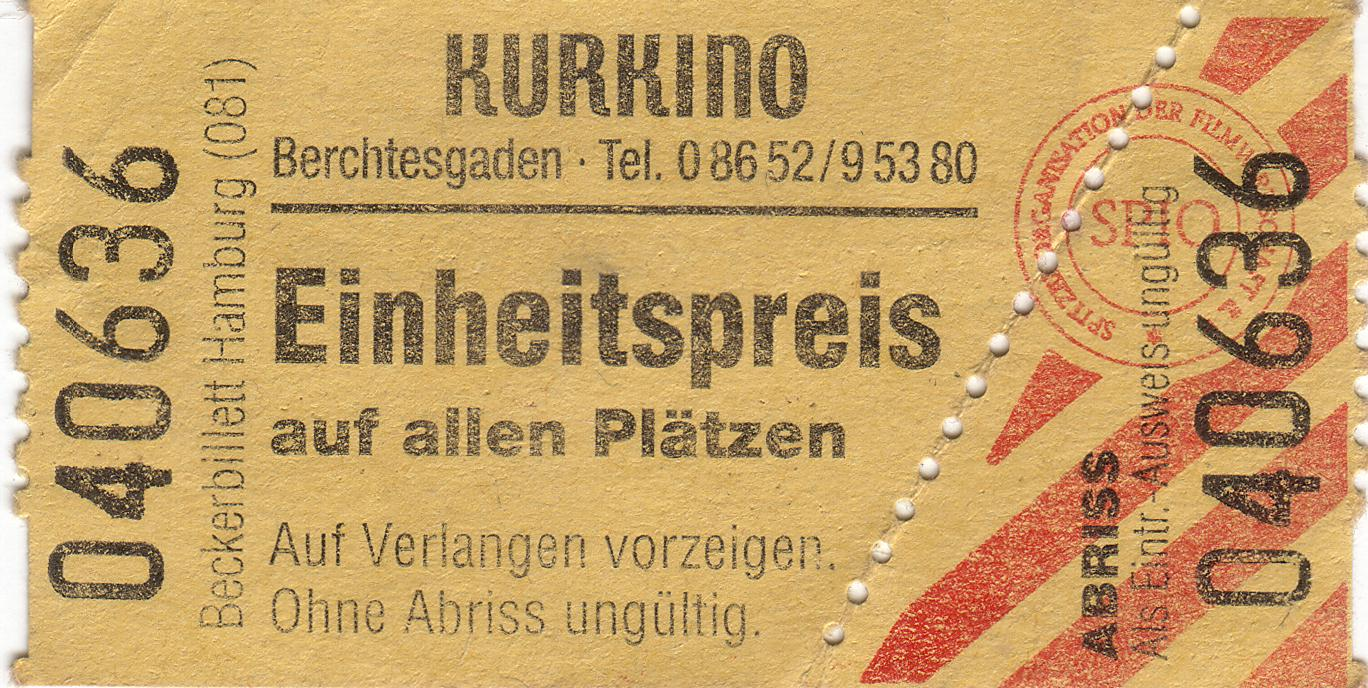
An unseparated ticket for the Kurkino in Berchtesgaden (2005 or earlier)

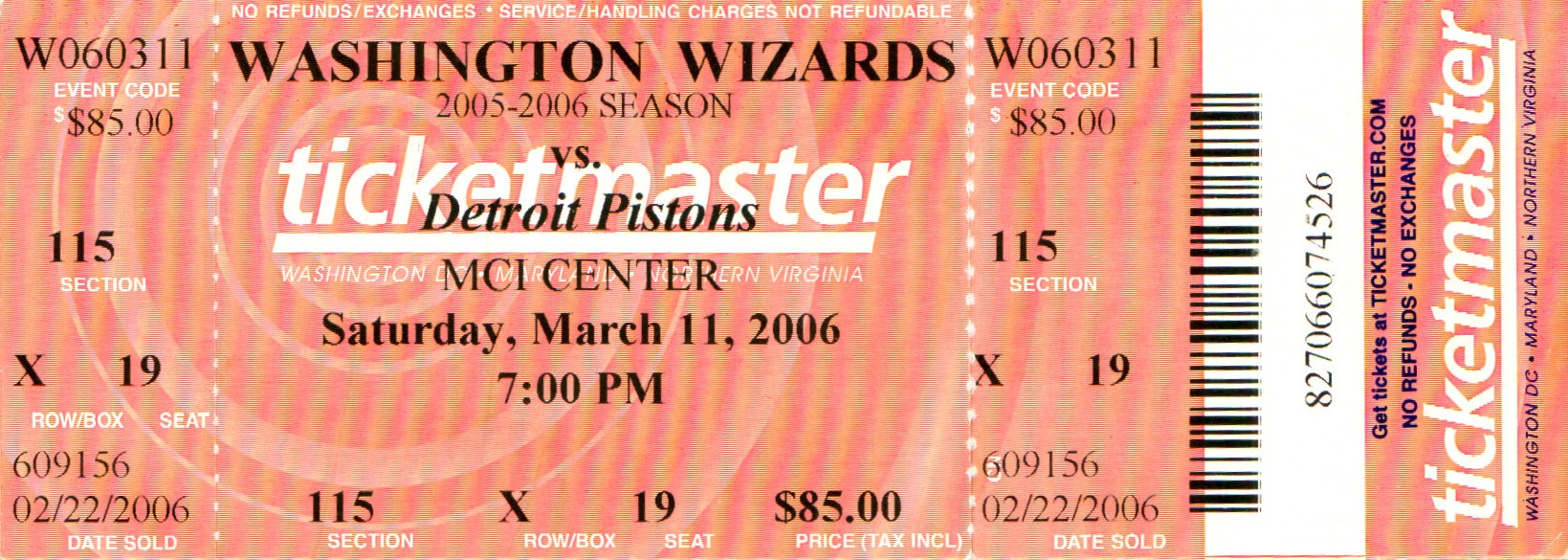
A U.S. basketball ticket from 2006

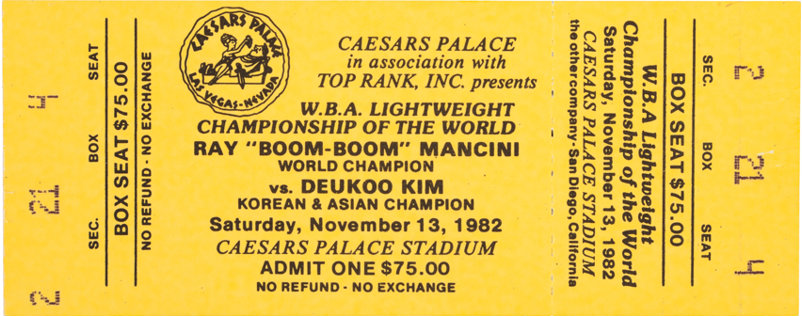
Boxing fight ticket from 1982 for a fight between Ray Mancini and Duk Koo Kim that ended with the latter's death

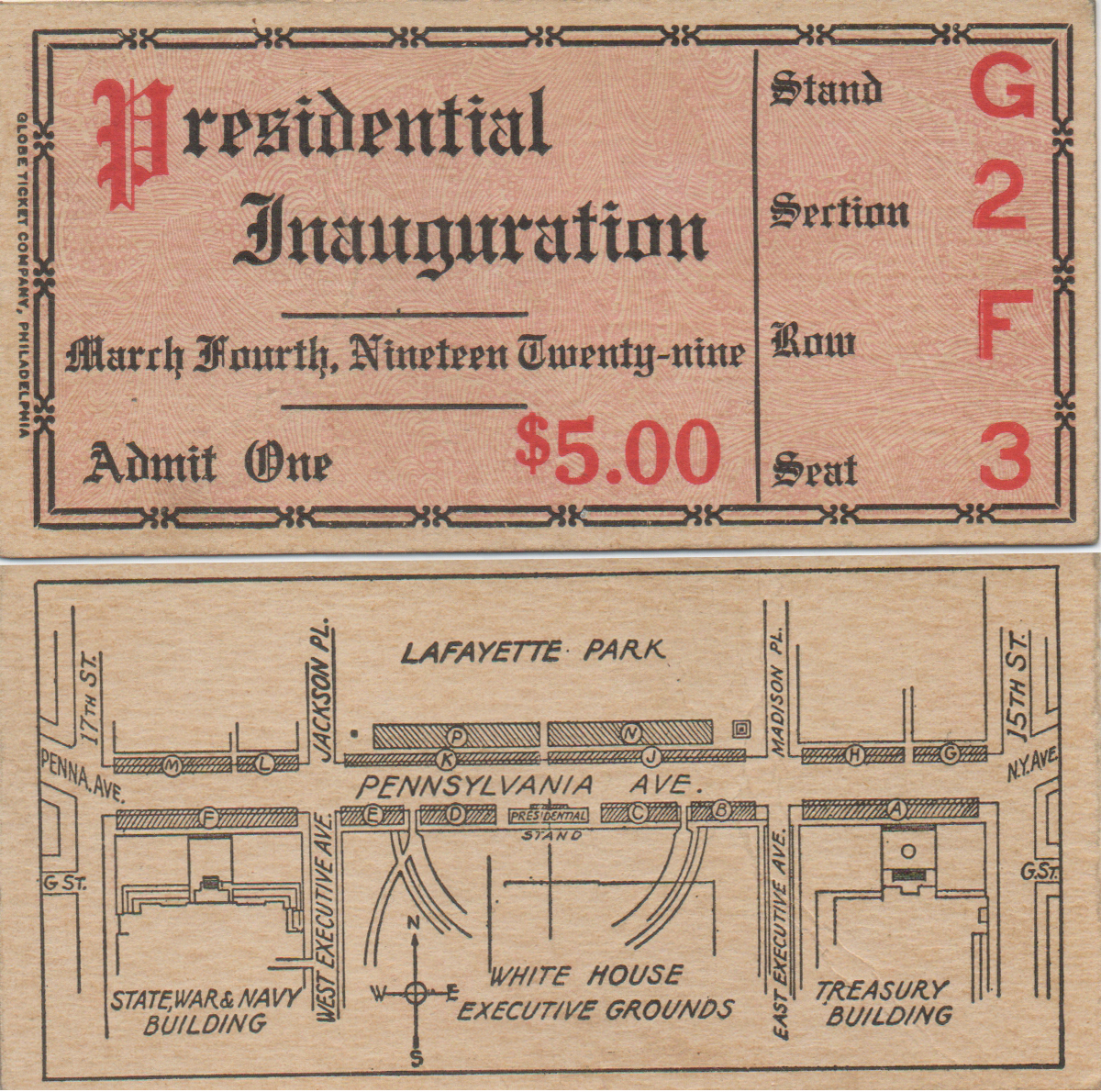
Inaugural Parade ticket for President Herbert Hoover, March 4, 1929

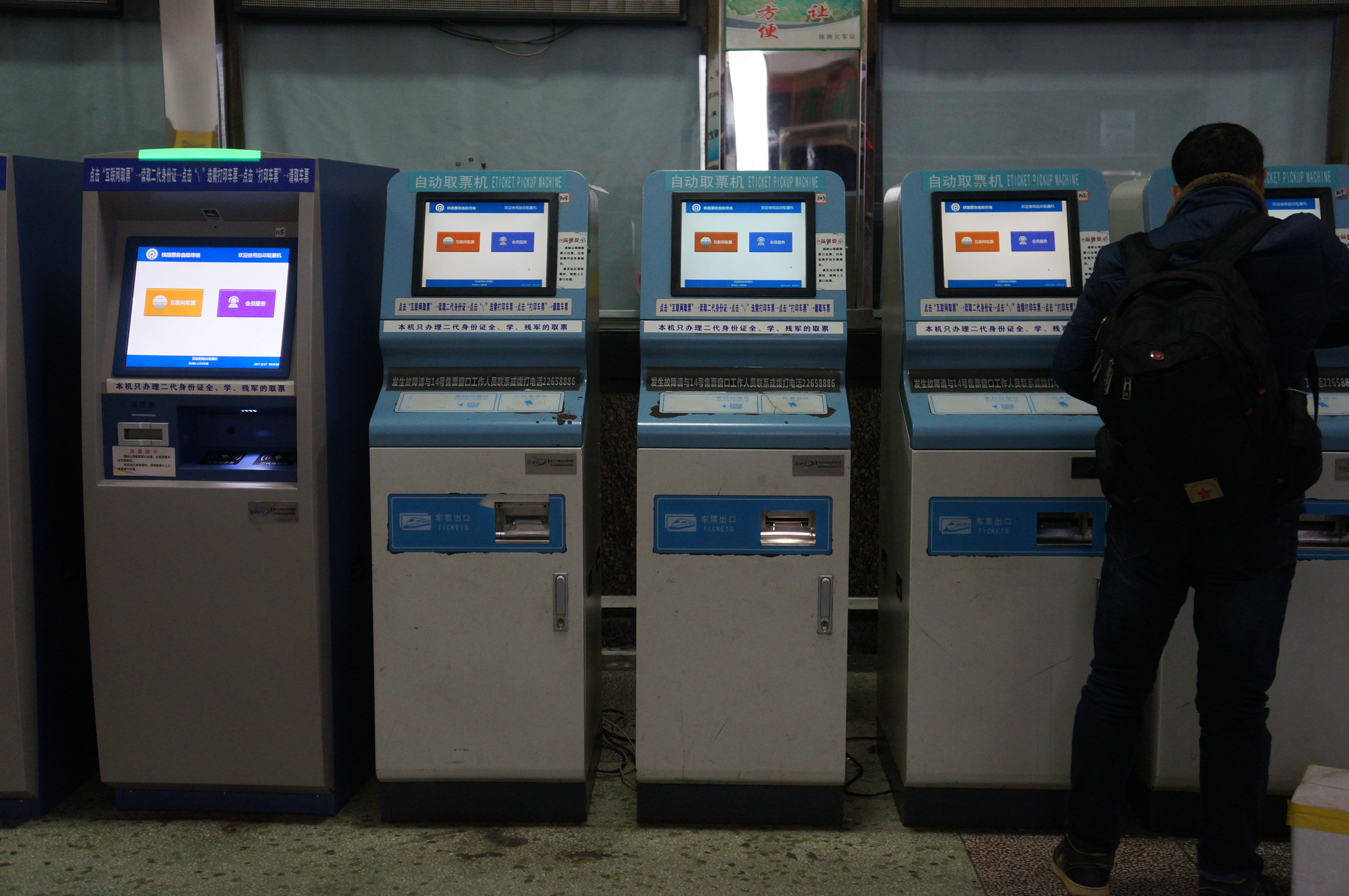
Ticket machines of China Railway in Zhuzhou Station

A ticket is a voucher that indicates that an individual is entitled to admission to an event or establishment such as a theatre, amusement park, stadium, or tourist attraction, or has a right to travel on a vehicle, such as with an airline ticket, bus ticket or train ticket. An individual typically pays for a ticket, but it may be free of charge. A ticket may serve simply as proof of entitlement or reservation. A ticket may be valid for any seat (called "free seating" or "open seating") or for a specific one (called "allocated seating" or "reserved seating").

Members of the public can buy a ticket at a ticket window or counter, called a box office in the entertainment industry (this term also refers to total receipts), or online or by telephone. Tickets may also be sold by resellers, commercial entities that purchase tickets in bulk and resell them to the public with a surcharge. Consumers use resellers for convenience and availability, especially when primary tickets are sold out.

On some bus or train journeys, both free and reserved seating are available, typically with an extra charge for a reserved seat. With free seating, passengers may have to stand on crowded services. In contrast, in arenas, cinemas, or theatres, free seating guarantees a seat, but not a specific one.

Paper or card is generally used, although plastic may be used for durability. Some tickets include a barcode or magnetic stripe for storing data; higher-end tickets may include chips that store more data and help prevent counterfeiting.

A paper ticket is often perforated into two parts: a ticket stub for the customer and a section kept by the ticket controller. Rules on leaving and re-entering vary; it may be restricted to prevent reuse, or allowed in venues such as cinemas for access to facilities during a performance.

Tickets may be printed in advance, fully or partially printed at issue, or completed by hand (e.g., by a train conductor carrying blank forms and a pen).

== Security issues ==
=== Counterfeit tickets ===
Counterfeit tickets are a problem at high-priced concerts and other events, so holograms are used on tickets for the FIFA World Cup, Olympic Games, Super Bowl, and other high-profile events.

=== Ticket "pass-backs" ===
Passing back a ticket refers to a fraudulent practice where an attendee, after entering an event using a physical ticket, attempts to give or "pass back" their used ticket to another person outside the venue. This allows the second person to then use the same ticket to gain unauthorized entry, essentially circumventing the entry fee. This scam is particularly prevalent at events where tickets are simply scanned or torn upon entry without further authentication or where re-entry is permitted, allowing the original ticket holder to exit and hand off the ticket.

=== Duplicate ticket / Multiple use fraud ===
This scam involves selling or distributing multiple copies of a single, valid admission ticket (whether digital or physical) to different individuals. The first person to successfully use the ticket (e.g., by scanning a barcode or QR code) gains entry, while all subsequent attempts with the identical ticket are denied. Event organizers implement measures, such as real-time scanning and validation systems, to detect and prevent such repeated use of the same admission right. To counter such fraud, the QR code on each issued ticket is typically a unique, server-generated token whose payload is cross-checked against a central database at scan time; some platforms have moved to dynamic codes that refresh on the holder's device every few seconds, so that a screenshot or photocopy expires before it can be reused.

=== Internet ticket fraud ===
Online ticket fraud is widespread, with deceptive websites designed to look authentic stealing customers' money by failing to deliver tickets. A notable instance of this was during the 2008 Beijing Olympic Games, where many fraudulent ticket websites operated from outside China, leaving buyers without valid admission.

== Virtual queueing ==
Free tickets are applied in virtual queueing. In a place where one has to wait one's turn, there may be the system that one takes a ticket with a number from a dispenser. This system is usually found in hospitals and surgeries, and at offices where many people visit, like town halls, social security offices, labor exchanges, or post offices.

Another form of virtual queuing is where the ticket carries a time-slot on it, rather than just a sequentially incremented number. This type of ticket would allow someone to do other things and then return for a roller-coaster ride, for example, without having to actually stand and wait in line.

== Coach (Bus) ticket ==
A coach ticket is a document created by a coach (bus) operator or a travel agent to confirm that an individual has reserved a seat on a coach. This document is then used to obtain travel on the operators coach fleet. Only with this ticket is the passenger allowed to board the coach.

A paper ticket is only good for the coach operator for which it was purchased. Usually the paper ticket is for a specific journey. It is sometimes possible to purchase an 'open' ticket which allows travel on any coach between the destinations listed on the ticket. The cost for doing this is often greater than a ticket for a specific journey.

Some tickets are refundable. However the lower cost tickets are usually not refundable and may carry many additional restrictions.

It is now common for a traveller to print out tickets online and use these on coaches instead of having tickets sent to them in the traditional way. Many coach operators use this system to save costs; some allow a text from the operator to act as a ticket with a unique reference number.

== Pass ==
A pass is a special ticket, representing some subscription, in particular for unlimited use of a service or collection of services. Sometimes the pass replaces the tickets, sometimes it entitles the holder to free tickets. In the latter case, typically both the pass and the ticket has to be shown at the ticket check.

Alternatively, there is the discount pass, for services such as those above: for a fee per unit time (or as a benefit on other grounds) one gets a discount on each purchase. Alternatively, a multi-use ticket (either valid a limited time, or indefinitely) may provide a discount. For example, a pass for entering a cinema 6 times within a year may cost the price of 4 or 5 tickets. A multi-use ticket may or may not be personal. If not, there may be a limitation to the number of people who can use the same multi-use ticket at the same time.

== Collecting (hobby) ==
After its original use, tickets can serve as a collectible item and collecting them is an internationally spread hobby. A ticket's value for collectors is mainly based on the event connected to it. Other important criteria for collectors might be rarity, theme, or even a country of issue. Collectors typically use online catalogs as the information source for tickets. In addition to acquiring tickets by themselves, collectors often trade between each other or purchase used tickets from online marketplaces.

News report by Voice of America about ticket prices at the 2016 World Series, the first world series game at Wrigley Field in 71 years

== Gallery ==
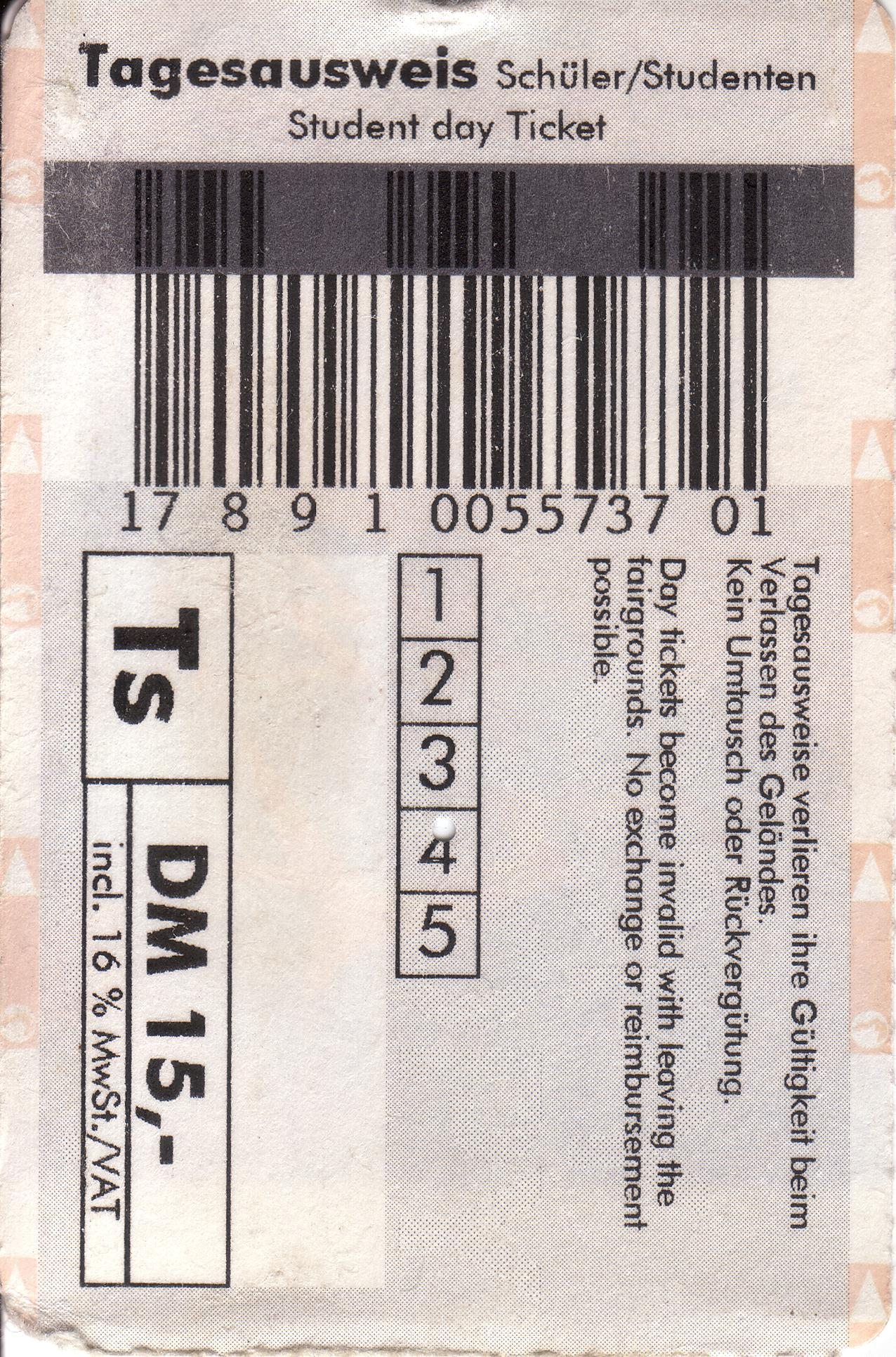
CeBIT Home 1998 student day ticket with barcode

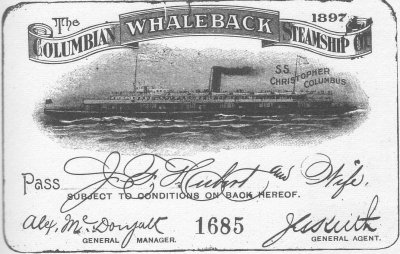
A pass allowing free passage on the SS Christopher Columbus steamship, c. 1896

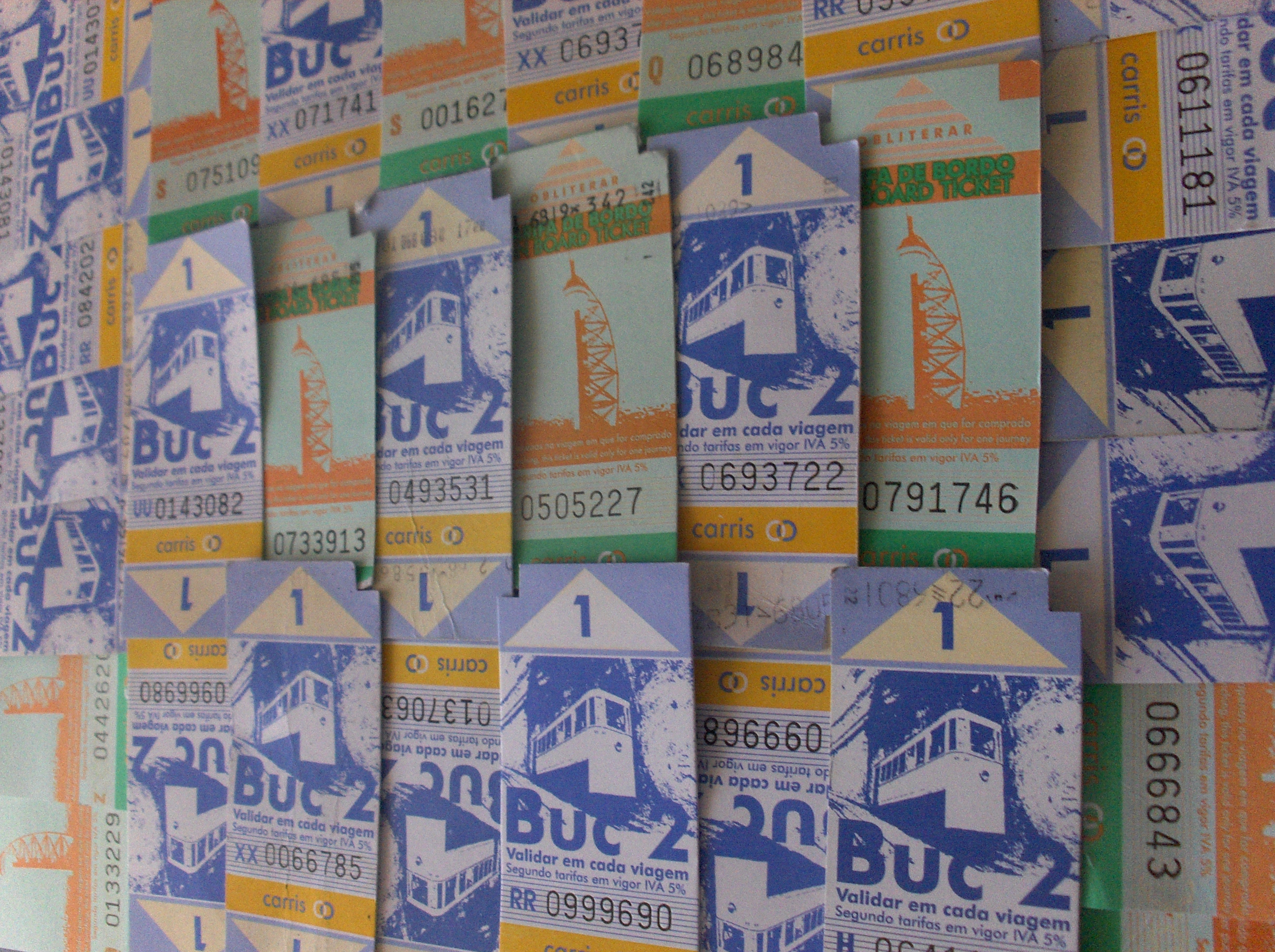
An assortment of bus tickets from Carris that could be used in Lisbon in the late 20th century

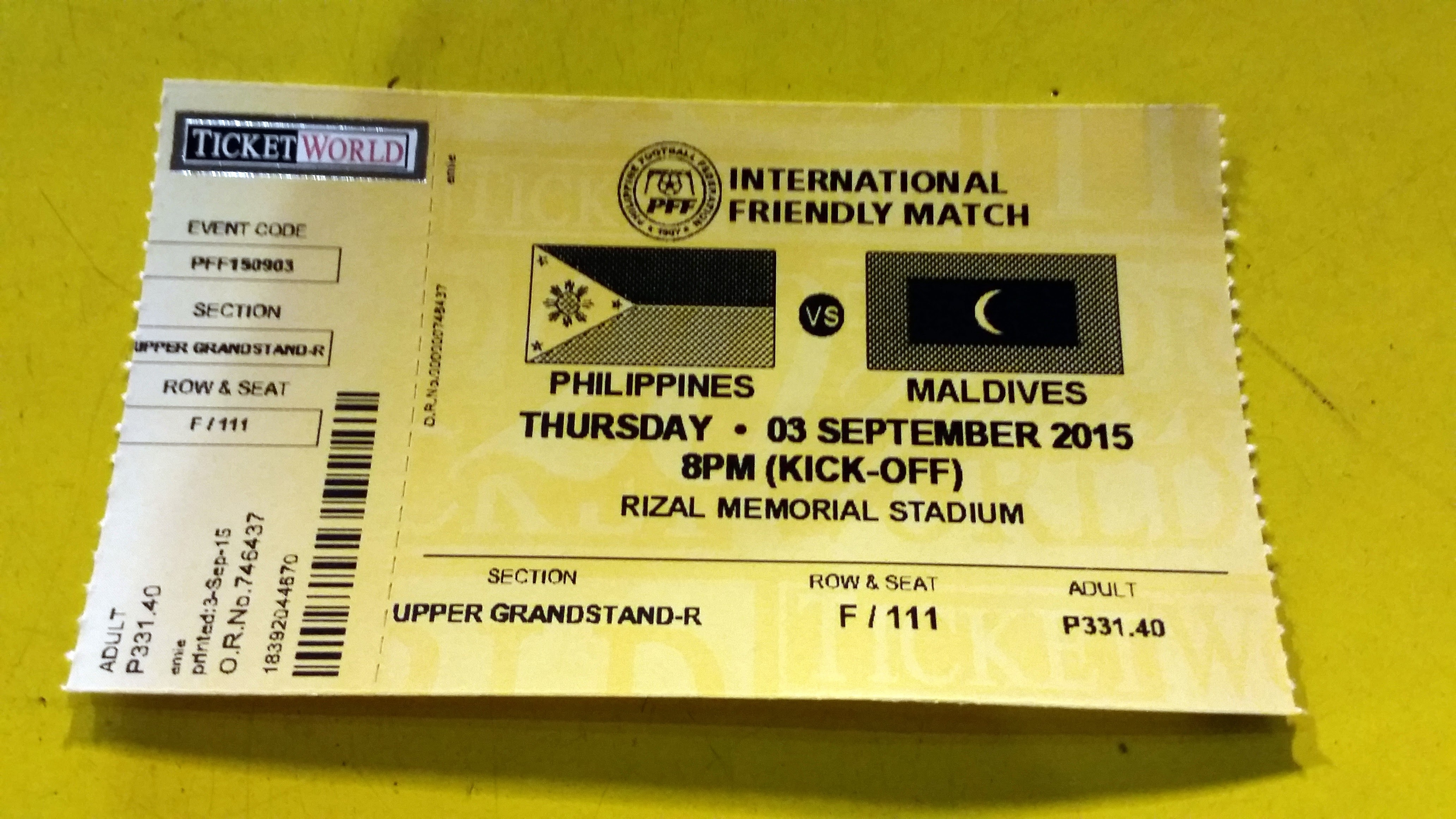
An admission ticket for an association football friendly between the national teams of the Philippines and the Maldives; 3 September 2015

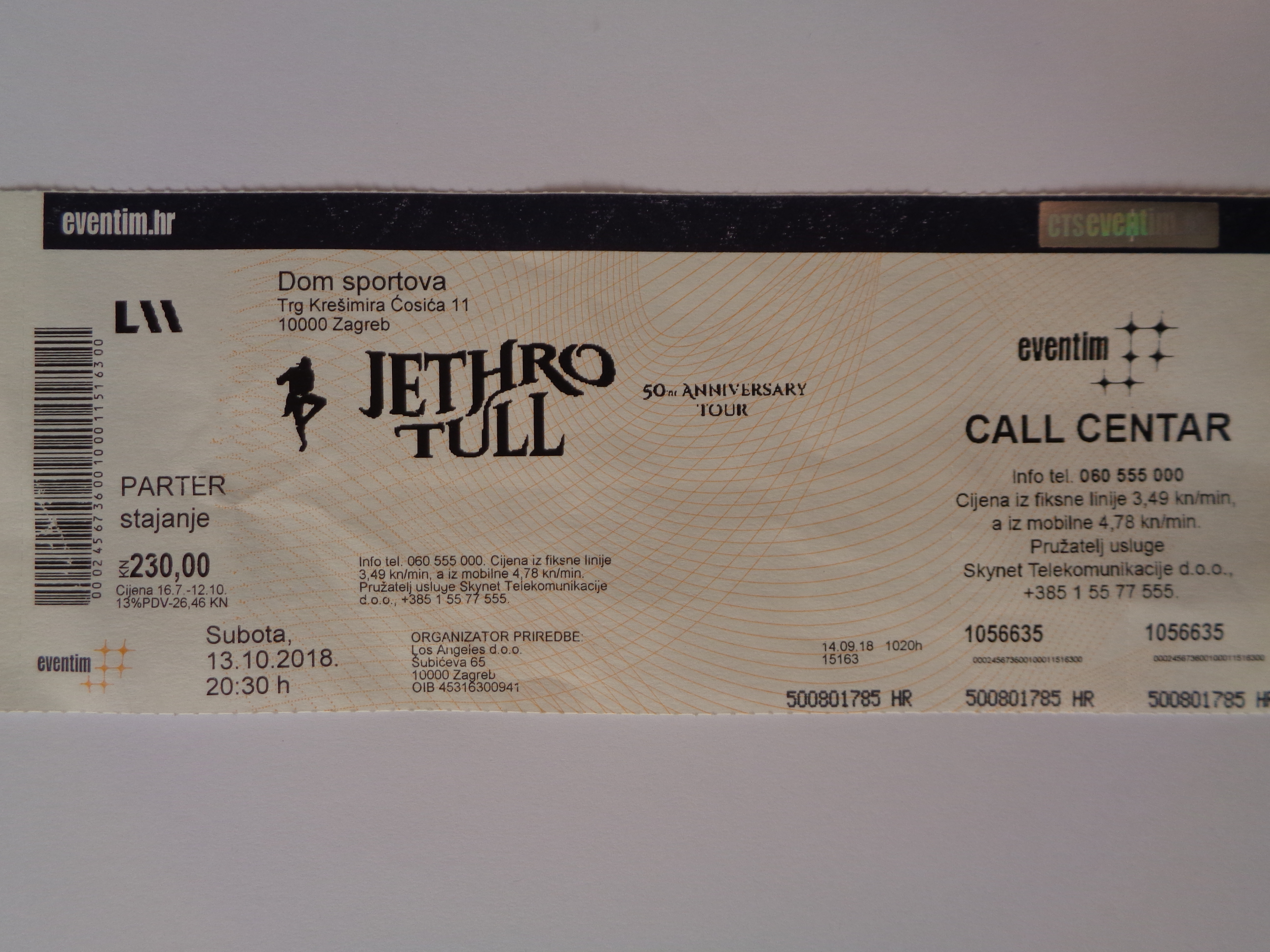
A 2018 rock concert ticket

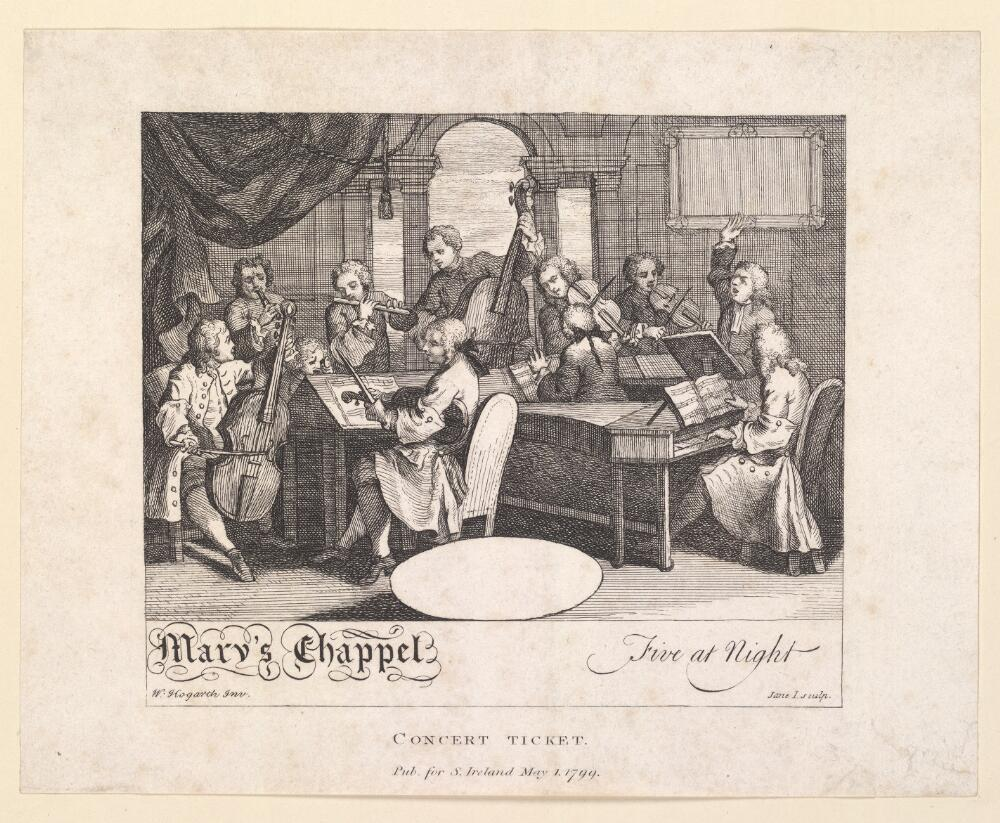
Engraved concert ticket for a Charles Benjamin Incledon performance. May 1799 by William Hogarth.

== See also ==
- Public transport ticket systems
- Ticket machine
- Ticket resale, or "scalping"
- Season ticket
- Transfer ticket
- Rover, a UK bus/train ticket
