= Beamish Museum transport collection =

Coordinates: 54°52′55″N 1°39′30″W

A tram and a bus transporting passengers to various parts of the museum, in the 1900s town

Beamish Museum contains much of transport interest, and the size of its site makes good internal transportation for visitors and staff purposes a necessity.

== Standard gauge railway locomotives and stock ==
In the railway station yard, a variety of wagons are on display. Regular steam operation ceased in 1994 due to the lack of permanently available working locomotives. From the nearby Bowes Railway, Andrew Barclay locomotives No. 22 and W.S.T. have made visits in recent years. The museum's restored North Eastern Railway coach was moved to the Tanfield Railway, also nearby, but it returned to Beamish in 2012 for restoration and use.

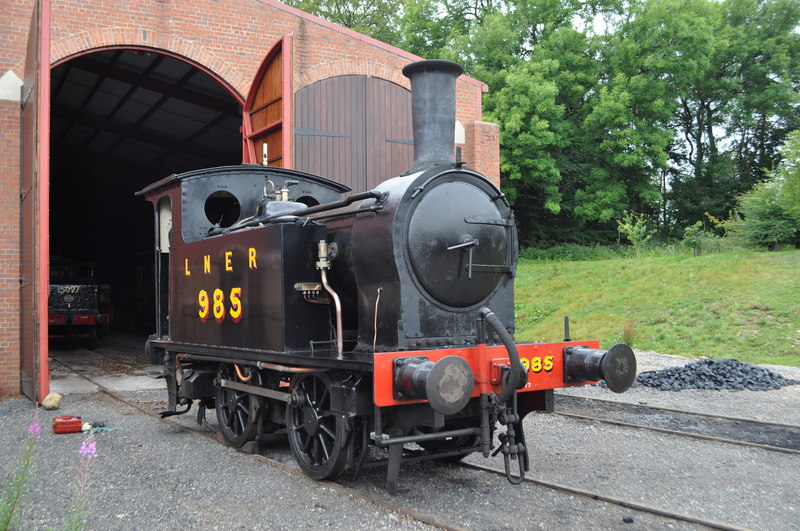
LNER 68088 at Beamish, 2011

Resident locomotives include NER Class C1 freight engine No. 876 (British Railways Class J21 No. 65033), built at Gateshead in 1889. After lying out of use since 1984 it was moved to the North Norfolk Railway for restoration in 2007. Transferred to the LCLT trust 2010 and is currently under major rebuild. The museum also formerly operated its Hawthorn Leslie industrial engine No. 14 till 1994

In February 2011 the museum received a 1923-built LNER Y7 Class 0-4-0T engine on a three-year loan from the North Norfolk Railway. The engine ran a passenger service at Rowley Station on weekends during the summer season. As of 2026, 0-4-4T Dunrobin, which Beamish purchased in 2010 for use on the Rowley Station line, is under restoration at the Severn Valley Railway. In 2012 Beamish also purchased 0-6-0 Saddle Tank Newcastle; restoration is planned. Beamish hired in Andrew Barclay, Works No. 1147 of 1908 vintage, 0-4-0ST John Howe from Ribble Steam Railway, Preston Docks to operate steam trains on weekends and school holidays in 2014. The following year in 2015, Avonside Works No. 1764 of 1917 vintage, 0-6-0ST No. 34 Portbury was on hire from Bristol Harbour Railway. During 2017 Andrew Barclay, Works No. 807 of 1897 vintage, 0-4-0ST Bon Accord was in use and Peckett, Works No. 1370 of 1915 vintage, 0-4-0ST May was in use hauling trains during weekends until 2019, however she moved to colliery in 2021 and moved away in 2022

Builder	Number and name	Wheel arrangement	Build date	Current status	Image
Head Wrightson	No. 1.	0-4-0VBGT	1871	Operational	
Head Wrightson	No. 17	0-4-0VB	1873	Awaiting Restoration	
Stephen Lewin	No. 18	0-4-0ST	1877	Undergoing Overhaul	
Black, Hawthorn & Co	No. 1	2-4-0CT	1887	Awaiting restoration	
Sharp, Stewart and Company	No. 4085 Dunrobin	0-4-4T	1895	Undergoing restoration at the Severn Valley Railway	
South Durham I&S Co.	No. 5 Malleable	0-4-0ST	1900	Static Display	
Manning Wardle	No. 1532 Newcastle	0-6-0ST	1901	Awaiting restoration	
Robert Stephenson and Hawthorns	No. 7006 Roker	0-4-0CT	1940	Static Display	

== Waggonway locomotives and stock ==
For use on the Pockerley Waggonway, the museum has three replicas of early steam locomotives (Locomotion No. 1), (Steam Elephant) and (Puffing Billy), all of which can be steamed (but with only one usually in service on any given day): An original locomotive, the 1850s Hetton Lyon, was a static exhibit in the Great Shed.

Name	Wheel arrangement	Original build date	Replica build date	Original builder	Original operator	Current status	Image
Puffing Billy	0-4-0	1813	2006	William Hedley	Wylam Colliery	Operational	
Steam Elephant	0-6-0	1814	2002	William Chapman	Wallsend Colliery	Stored, Awaiting overhaul	
Locomotion No. 1	0-4-0	1825	1975	George Stephenson	Stockton and Darlington Railway	Not Currently on Site. Formed part of Railway 200 in 2025	
Hetton Lyon	0-4-0	1851	N/A	Young	Hetton colliery railway	Static Display, National Railway Museum Shildon	

=== Puffing Billy ===
The museum has a replica of Puffing Billy, built in 2006 by Alan Keef.

The original Puffing Billy was built in 1813/14, and is the world's oldest surviving steam locomotive. The original was designed by William Hedley for Wylam Colliery, where it saw use for nearly 50 years, hauling coal chaldron wagons on the Wylam to Lemington waggonway. The name is said to derive from its owner, who sounded like his new locomotive due to a breathing difficulty. It was the first commercial adhesion steam locomotive; the drive wheels moved the train through friction alone.

Originally built with four wheels on two drive axles, the locomotive's weight, at eight tons, caused it to break the cast iron waggonway rails. It was rebuilt with eight wheels, on four drive axles, allowing the weight to be spread over more wheels. The engine was restored to its original, four wheel configuration, when improved edge-rail track was introduced around 1830. Puffing Billy remained in service until 1862, and survives as a static exhibit in the Science Museum in London.

=== Steam Elephant ===
The museum's replica of Steam Elephant was built in 2001, by Alan Keef and Dorothea Restorations.

The original locomotive was built in 1814/14, although its existence was not known of until 1931. Originally thought to have been designed by George Stephenson, research by the museum showed it was actually by William Chapman' for use in John Buddle's Wallsend Colliery. After use at Wallsend, it moved to Washington and then Hetton collieries, with records of its service appearing to end in the 1840s. The replica was built from a contemporary oil and water colour paintings, which were also the source of the name.

=== Locomotion No. 1 ===
Locomotion No. 1 is a replica of an original locomotive which was designed by George Stephenson and built in 1825 for the Stockton and Darlington Railway, which made it the first steam locomotive to carry passengers on a public rail line. The Beamish replica was completed in 1975 for the 150th anniversary of the S&DR. The original survives as a static exhibit, having eventually become part of the National Collection held by the National Railway Museum at its Shildon site. The replica was overhauled in time for the 2025 Railway 200 celebrations where it replicated the original journey along the Stockton and Darlington. It has since visited other heritage railways.

=== Hetton Lyon ===
Hetton Lyon was built around 1851/52 for use in the Hetton colliery railway, but being of an old fashioned design it was initially assumed it to have been built earlier. It is thought to have been designed by someone named Young, one of whose descendants, David, is a Beamish volunteer working on steam restorations. Having survived into the twentieth century by virtue of being used as a static engine for the colliery sawmill, the locomotive was put back into service by the London and North Eastern Railway for the Stockton and Darlington Railway's centenary celebrations in 1925, before passing into the National Collection at the National Railway Museum as a static exhibit. The NRM loaned it to Beamish in 1974, where it stayed until 2006, initially in the Colliery but later on the Waggonway, before being moved to the NRM's satellite facility, National Railway Museum Shildon (Locomotion). The NRM later agreed a second loan period, so in May 2011 the locomotive returned to its last display location, in the SW corner of the Great Shed before in 2019 returning to the National Railway Museum Shildon.

=== Waggonway stock ===
The carriages for the waggonway are replicas of Experiment, used on the opening day of the Stockton & Darlington Railway, as well as an open carriage of slightly later design.

=== Carriages and wagons ===
Railway	Number	Type	Image	Current status
Stockton & Darlington		Semi-open third replica		Built in 1995. Used on Pockerley Waggonway.
Stockton & Darlington		Semi-open and saloon		Built in 2017. Chassis rebuilt from scrapped 1995-built replica of 'Long Tub' carriage. Used on the Pockerley Tramway.
North London Railway	Unknown	4w Second		Used by workmen's trains on Furness Railway metals. Owned by Furness Railway Trust, was preserved in 1971 by Lakeside & Haverthwaite Railway after being purchased from British Rail for £5. body restored 2002-03 then placed on underframe of SR PMVY S1496S. Moved to Beamish in October 2018.
Highland Railway	58A	4w Saloon		Duke of Sutherland's Saloon built in 1909 at Lochgorm. Ran with 0-4-4T 'Dunrobin'. Restored to pre-WW1 condition.
Stockton & Darlington	179	Four-wheel third		One of the oldest railway carriage on its original underframe. Under restoration, now at Beamish for final mechanical overhaul work, lettering and numbering.
North Eastern Railway	1972	Bogie Third		Sold to NCB in 1955. Preserved in 1968. Currently stored awaiting restoration.
North Eastern Railway	3071	Clerestory Bogie Composite		Built in 1903. Sold to NCB in 1949. Preserved in 1968. Restored. Overhaul and repaint being planned.

== Narrow Gauge Colliery Railway ==
Builder	Number and name	Build date	Current status	Image
Hunslet Engine Company	996 'Edward Sholto'	1909	Static Display	
Stephen Lewin	Samson	1874 (Replica Built 2016)	Operational	
Andrew Barclay Sons & Co	No. 1994 'Glyder'	1931	Operational	

== Trams ==
Beamish is home to several electric trams, some of which operate daily. A horse tram is also part of the collection

=== Stocklist ===
Original operator	Number	Year built	Current livery	Seats	Current status	Image
Sunderland Corporation Tramways	16	1900	Crimson and cream	66	Operational	
Grimsby & Immingham Electric Railway	26	1925	British Railways green.	48	Undergoing overhaul	
Blackpool tramway	31	1901	Red, white and teak	86	Operational	
Newcastle and Gosforth Tramways and Carriage Company	49	1880	N/A	N/A	Undergoing restoration	
Gateshead and District Tramways Company	51	1900	N/A	32	Awaiting restoration	
Gateshead and District Tramways Company	52	1901	N/A	32	Awaiting restoration	
Oporto Tramways Company	65	1933	Chevrons	0	Undergoing restoration	
Newcastle Corporation Tramways	114	1901	Brown, yellow and white	53	Operational	
Oporto Tramways Company	196	1935	Blue and primrose yellow	28	Operational	
Sheffield Tramway	264	1907	Blue and cream	54	Operational	
Sheffield Tramway	513	1950	Blue and cream	62	Operational, on loan to the East Anglia Transport Museum	

=== Gateshead 10 (Grimsby 26) ===
Gateshead 10 was built in 1925 by the Gateshead and District Tramways Company, one of a batch of single-deck trams built by their Sunderland Road works from 1920 to 1928. Built to a length of 48'8", it was fitted with longitudinal seating for 48 passengers with front exit and rear entrance doors, two Brill 39E reversed maximum traction bogies powered by Dick Kerr DK31A 35 hp motors with English Electric DB1 K3 controllers. Braking systems featured air brakes acting on the wheels and the track-brakes. It operated it in their fleet as No. 10, working routes in Gateshead as well as services across the River Tyne to Newcastle and Gosforth. When the system closed in 1952, No. 10 was one of a batch of 19 similar trams sold to the Eastern Region of British Railways, for use on their Grimsby & Immingham Electric Railway. Operated in their fleet as No. 26 in their dark green livery, it worked on the system until its closure on 1 July 1961. Instead of being scrapped, it was retained by the British Transport Commission as a candidate for preservation.

Intending to use it at the museum, in 1968 the Northern Tramways Sponsors purchased the tram, restoring it to its Gateshead 10 identity at the Consett Iron Company works. The first tram to arrive at the museum, it was used for the inaugural passenger services on a short demonstration line in June 1973. A major rebuild between 1983 and 1985 returned it to 1920s condition, featuring an ornate interior. In 2012 it was repainted into its former Grimsby identity. An overhaul began in January 2016, from which it will emerge repainted as Gateshead 10.

Media related to Gateshead and District Tramways No. 10 at Wikimedia Commons Media related to Grimsby and Immingham Electric Tramways No. 26 at Wikimedia Commons

=== Sunderland 16 ===
Sunderland 16 was built in 1900 by Dick, Kerr & Co. in Preston for Sunderland Corporation Tramways, part of a batch of five open top double-decker trams, numbered 13 to 18. It is the sole-surviving original Sunderland tram, Sunderland having been the second-largest tramway undertaking in the North East. This batch had to wait until after World War One to have its open top rebuilt as a closed deck, something which had been done to most of the rest of the fleet by 1916. Subsequent modifications in the 1920s and 1930s saw changes to the interior (seating and staircases), running gear (trucks) and current collector (a bow set up replacing trolley pole). Following the Sunderland system's closure in 1954, it was one of a few trams to escape destruction, instead finding use as changing rooms for football teams, before being broken up in the late 1950s - its lower saloon being moved to Westwood Farm in Low Warden near Hexham, for use as a tool shed and apple store.

The museum then rescued the body as a potential restoration project, moving it to the museum in 1989. Returning it to 1920s closed top condition, the reconstructed lower deck was mounted on a refurbished second hand Peckham P35 truck, with a new upper deck built from scratch. The restored tram entered service in July 2003. Following another overhaul, it returned to service in December 2014. Re-tyred in 2018.

Media related to Sunderland Corporation Tramways No. 16 at Wikimedia Commons

=== Blackpool 31 (Blackpool Engineering Car 4 / 754) ===
Blackpool 31 was built in 1901 at the Midland Railway Carriage and Wagon Company for Blackpool Tramway, originally as a four-wheel double-decker open topper, for use on the Marton route. In a trial of its intended Standard class tram designs, it was rebuilt in 1918, which saw the body being extended and remounted on a new underframe fitted with two English Electric 4′ wheelbase equal-wheel bogies, to the American McGuire pattern (the smaller end windows correspond to the length by which the body was extended), with BTH 265C 35 hp motors and BTH 510 controllers.

It operated as an open top unvestibuled tram until 1928, when a top cover was fitted. A transfer to the Engineering Department in 1934 saw the tram renumbered 4 and modified for engineering use - the top cover being removed and replaced with a central wire inspection tower with current collection poles front and rear, and driver's windscreens fitted. In the Blackpool fleet renumbering of the 1960s, it was renumbered 754.

After seeing regular use as an engineering tram, in July 1984 it was placed on long-term loan to the museum, with the intention of restoring it to its 1920s condition (open top, open platform double-decker). It entered service in 1988, being used in the summer seasons. it returned to Blackpool for the 1998 summer season only, to take part in the Blackpool – Fleetwood Tramway centenary celebrations. The tram was withdrawn for overhaul in 2016. This work involved attention to the motor, controllers and the paintwork and was completed in 2018.

Media related to Blackpool Corporation Transport No. 31 at Wikimedia Commons

=== Newcastle and Gosforth Tramways and Carriage Company 49 ===
Newcastle and Gosforth Tramways and Carriage Company 49 was built in 1880 and is an open-top horse-drawn tram. The tram is being completely restored and this will involve using significant components from a second horse-tram, Leamington and Warwick No. 8. The restoration has been progressing steadily since 2013 and when completed, the tram will be used on special occasions.

=== Gateshead 51 ===
Gateshead 51's remains were transferred to Beamish in 2006 where the eventual plan will be to restore it as a fully enclosed single-decker. Although known to have been No. 51 on withdrawal, its prior history is unclear.

=== Gateshead 52 ===
Gateshead 52 was originally a single-deck 'California' style tram until the open end compartments were covered over around 1903. Was involved in an accident in 1916 after it rolled down a steep hill with passengers on board. After this it was rebuilt to its present format and was withdrawn in 1951. Bought by its former driver, it passed to the National Tramway Museum on his death, where it was stored, and damaged in an arson attack. It was transferred to Beamish in 2014, with a full restoration planned.

=== Oporto 65 ===
Oporto 65 was built in 1933 and is a coal car, built for use on the Porto (Oporto) tramway system. Its original purpose was carrying coal, a role which it undertook for many years before being withdrawn from service. In 2005 it was acquired by the National Tramway Museum where it was intended to be restored but this never materialised. Beamish acquired the vehicle in 2016, arriving at the museum in the September. The intention is to restore 65 to operational condition where it will be used once again as a works and maintenance vehicle, plus on the driving experience courses. Work on the truck and controllers is underway. Bodywork will be restored at a later date.

=== Newcastle 114 (Sheffield 317) ===
Newcastle 114 was built in 1901 by Hurst Nelson and Co. of Motherwell for Newcastle Corporation Tramways, one of a batch of 24 open-top short-canopied ‘A- Class’ vehicles delivered to replace horse trams. It is the only example of its type to have survived. As built, it was fitted with 53 wooden seats, and ran on a 6′ 6" wheelbase Brill 21E truck powered by GE 58 motors with BTH B3 controllers. They received multiple rebuilds while in Newcastle service, including the fitting of a top cover for the upper deck seating. Latterly consigned to the Gosforth Park scrap siding, in 1941 it and most of its sister trams were instead sold to Sheffield Corporation to replace war damaged vehicles. Further rebuilt by Sheffield to be totally enclosed and vestibuled, it entered service in their fleet as No. 317, before finally being withdrawn in 1951.

The tram's body was later rediscovered on an arable farm near Scunthorpe, and arrived at Beamish in 1987 via various other locations. The museum restored it to 1901 condition, using a suitably modified truck with GE 270 motors sourced from Porto in 1989, and rebuilt BTH B18 controllers. It entered museum service in May 1996. It received a mid-life overhaul in 2011.

Media related to Newcastle Corporation Tramways No. 114 at Wikimedia Commons

=== South Shields 196 (Oporto 196) ===
South Shields 196 was built in 1935 at the Boavista Works of Oporto Tramways Company of Porto, Portugal. A small 4-wheel single decker, one of a batch of 77 similar examples, it was based on an American design dating from 1909. Mounted on a Brill 21E truck, it has two GE(USA) 270A 55 hp motors with licensee-built B54E controllers, and brakes using air-brake, emergency electric brake, and a handbrake operated by distinctive vertical hand-wheels to the right of the driver's position. After rebuild, it has seating arranged longitudinally for 28 passengers.

Having been withdrawn due to a collision, it was brought to the UK by the museum in 1989, who intended to use it as a source of spare parts for other trams. As it was found to be in sound condition, capable of running on arrival, it was instead decided to repair the collision damage and restore it as a complete vehicle. Oporto 176 was instead acquired for their spare part needs.

Intending to use it in the off season, the open platform ends were rebuilt to be enclosed, with folding doors on the UK loading side, and the original roof-mounted electrical resistances were replaced by new platform-mounted units, arranged to help to keep the car interior warm in winter. Original interior features were restored, although changes were made to the destination boxes. While the tram was repainted into the Beamish crimson and cream livery as used on No. 10, the intention of the restoration was to retain its original Portuguese styling as much as possible. It entered museum service in May 1992. In 2012 it received an overhaul and was repainted into a South Shields Corporation Tramways blue and yellow livery. At the end of 2016 it received a tyre and motor overhaul to prepare it for the busy Christmas season.

Media related to Beamish Tramways No. 196 at Wikimedia Commons Media related to South Shields Corporation Tramways No. 196 at Wikimedia Commons

=== Sheffield 264 (342) ===
Sheffield 264 was built by the United Electric Car Company of Preston for Sheffield Corporation Tramways, one of a batch of fifteen double-decker open balcony cars delivered in 1907. It was built with wooden seats for 54 passengers, mounted on a 4-wheel Peckham P22 truck with two Metrovick 102DR 60 hp motors using BTH B510 controllers, with braking systems being a handbrake acting on all wheels, an electric brake for emergency use and a hand-wheel operated track brake. A 1926 rebuild included modification to a fully enclosed upper deck. Displaced to peak hour use in the 1930s, it was renumbered 342, but was not withdrawn until 1956.

Acquired by the British Transport Commission, it was exhibited in Clapham Transport Museum until 1967. Northern Tramway Sponsors then moved it to premises at the Consett Iron Company. Due to the poor condition of the upper deck bodywork it was converted to an open topper, and after repainting into Gateshead livery, but still numbered 342, it was moved to Beamish in December 1973. It ran in service until 1985, when it was withdrawn for a complete rebuild into its 1920s open balcony form, being renumbered back to 264 and repainted into Sheffield livery of Prussian blue and cream with gold lining. Completed in 1987, it then ran in service for 14 years, until being withdrawn in 2002 for another major overhaul. This began in late 2013 when the tram was dismantled, and was completed in April 2016.

Media related to Sheffield Corporation Tramways No. 264 at Wikimedia Commons

=== Sheffield 513 ===
Sheffield 513 was built by Charles Roberts & Co. of Wakefield to a design by Sheffield Transport, as one of a batch of 35 double-decker trams constructed between 1950 and 1952. Fitted with comfortable upholstered seating for 62 passengers, it ran on a 4-wheel Maley and Taunton hornless type 588 truck with rubber and leaf spring suspension, powered by two Metrovick 101 DR3 65 hp motors with a pair of Crompton-West CT/TJ controllers (fitted in restoration). Braking systems feature air brakes acting on all wheels, with electric braking for emergency use. It only operated in Sheffield for eight years, as they abandoned their trams in 1960. It ran in the closing procession held on 8 October.

It was then purchased by Mr J Rothera of York, who first stored it at the Middleton Railway, before moving it to the Cullingworth goods shed near Halifax in 1962, and then presenting it to the Castle Museum, York in 1973. it arrived at Beamish in 1976, but having been stored outside for 16 years it was in poor condition, having been vandalised and deteriorated due to the weather, so restoration took five years, from 1978 to 1983.

On 1 October 1984 it was moved to Blackpool on a 14-month loan, to take part in the Blackpool Tramway centenary celebrations of September 1985. It saw further service and another major mechanical overhaul at Beamish until returning to Blackpool in February 2001 on another long-term loan. In 2012 it went on loan to the East Anglia Transport Museum.

Media related to Sheffield Corporation Tramways No. 513 at Wikimedia Commons

== Trolleybuses ==
The museum has collected a couple of trolleybuses.

- Keighley single-decker No. 12 built in 1924. This is a Straker-Squire chassis with British Thompson-Houston (BTH) electrical equipment and bodywork by Brush. It was withdrawn in 1932. In Storage
- Newcastle double-decker No. 501 built in 1948. This is a Sunbeam S7 with Metropolitan-Vickers electrical equipment and bodywork by Northern Coachbuilders. It was withdrawn from service between 1963 and 1965.

== Motor buses ==
The buses are used on a regular circular service around the museum site.

- replica Daimler Company open-top double-decker J 2503 to design of 1913 (1988). In Service.
- replica London General Omnibus Company open-top double-decker DET 720D to design of 1910. In Service.
- Northern General Transport Company BMMO-built SOS QL single-decker UP 551 built in 1928. Fully restored to working order, used during special events only.
- Dodge (UK) UF30A bus VK 5401 built in 1931. Worked around Rookhope. In Storage.
- replica Northern General Transport Company J 2007 to the design of a bus in the First World War Years. It is equipped with a wheelchair lift for easy access. In Service.
- Rotherham Corporation Daimler CVG6 KET 220 of 1954. In Service.
- Darlington Transport Daimler CVG5 304 VHN of 1964. In Service.
- Crosville Motor Services Leyland Cub KP2 FM 7443 (716) of 1933. Undergoing restoration offsite with a wheelchair lift for easy access.
- West Riding Leyland Cub HL 9621. In Storage.
Replica B-Type bus B1349 (DET 720D)

Bus EF-7380

Wheelchair-accessible bus FM 7443

== Other road vehicles ==
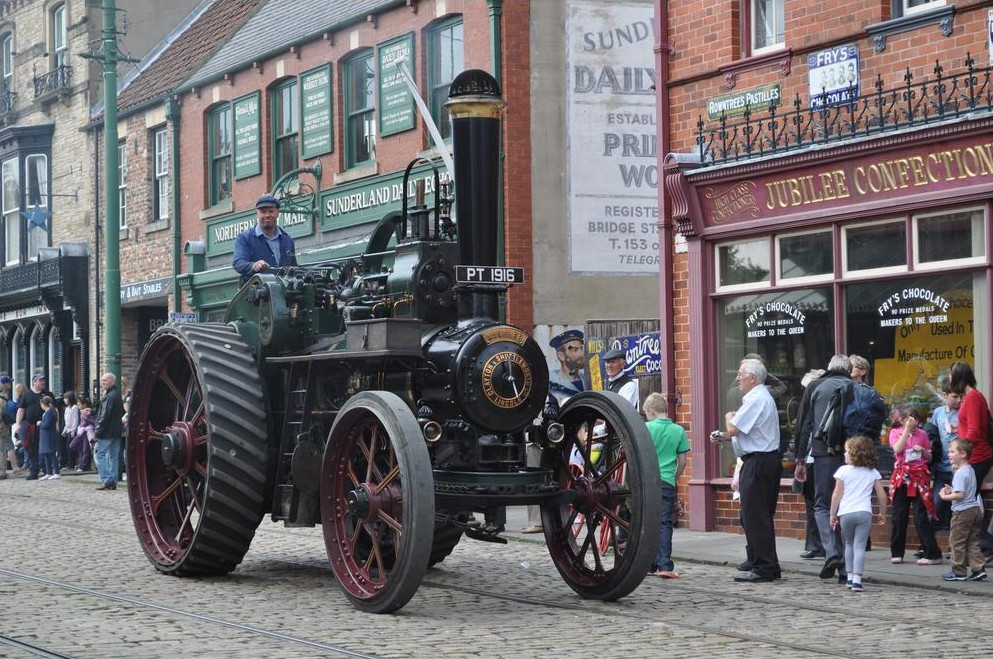
A traction engine on the town's streets at the museum

- Replica Armstrong Whitworth limousine. In occasional service. (The museum also has an original 1920 Armstrong Siddeley 20 h.p. car.)
- Brewery refreshment van NBA 517. In service.
- Replica Hoults Removals pantechnicon van. In service when horses available
- Ford Model T 1914 tourer CF-1593. Returned to working order in 2018 after many years on display in Beamish's showroom.
- Ford Model T 1925 Ton truck BF 4477. Undergoing restoration.
- Ford Model T Crewe Tractor 45288 (No. 39). In service. Constructed in 2017 from a standard 1922 Model T Van BF 4165.
- Austin 10 Cambridge 1937 saloon 659 UXW. Undergoing rebuild.
- Austin 20 1928 hearse YM 5032. Undergoing rebuild.
- Commer 8cwt 1933 van BTB 634. Undergoing bodywork repairs.
- SHEW 1907 pick-up car BR 211. Awaiting restoration.
- Daimler CK22 1923 Drop-side lorry BK 8794. On display in Beamish's showroom.
- Leyland Cub 1934 KG3 Drop-side truck VV 2708. Awaiting restoration.
- Leyland Cub 1932 KG3 Tipper Lorry BV 1673. In service.
- Morris Commercial 1933 33 cwt lorry YG 5825. In service. Rebuilt in 2018.
- Albion Motors 1947 Kirkcaldy Furniture Removal van. In service.
- Ford Thames 1956 Tip truck RYX 170. In service.
- Bedford CA van. In service.
- Land Rover Series 2A Pick-up. In service.

The museum owns other motor and steam vehicles, more than twenty pedal cycles and several motorcycles. From its extensive collection of horse-drawn vehicles, charabancs are to be seen in public service in the summer.

== Bibliography ==
- Joyce, J; King, J S; Newman, A G (1986). British Trolleybus Systems. London: Ian Allan Publishing. ISBN 978-0-7110-1647-7.
