= Liverpool Tramways Company =

Horse-drawn tram company 1869–1898

Operation
- Locale: Liverpool
- Open: 1 November 1869
- Close: 16 November 1898
- Status: Closed

Infrastructure
- Track gauge: 1,435 mm (4 ft 8 1/2 in)
- Propulsion system: Horse

Statistics
- Route length: 60.75 miles (97.77 km)

The Liverpool Tramways Company was operated horse-drawn tramway services in Liverpool from 1869 to 1898.

== History ==
Liverpool Tramways Act 1868
- Act of Parliament
- Parliament of the United Kingdom
- Long title: An Act for making Street Tramways in Liverpool; and for other Purposes.
- Citation: 31 & 32 Vict. c. clxvii

Dates
- Royal assent: 31 July 1868

Other legislation
- Repealed by: Liverpool Corporation Act 1921

Status: Repealed

Liverpool Tramways Act 1870
- Act of Parliament
- Parliament of the United Kingdom
- Long title: An Act for enabling the Liverpool Tramways Company to make new Street Tramways in Toxteth Park, in extension of their authorised undertaking; and for other purposes.
- Citation: 33 & 34 Vict. c. clxxvi

Dates
- Royal assent: 10 August 1870

Other legislation
- Repealed by: Liverpool Corporation Act 1921

Status: Repealed

Text of statute as originally enacted

Liverpool Tramways Act 1871
- Act of Parliament
- Parliament of the United Kingdom
- Long title: An Act for enabling the Liverpool Tramways Company to make new Tramways in Liverpool and its neighbourhood in connexion with and in extension of their authorised undertaking; and for other purposes.
- Citation: 34 & 35 Vict. c. clvii

Dates
- Royal assent: 24 July 1871

Other legislation
- Repealed by: Liverpool Corporation Act 1921

Status: Repealed

Text of statute as originally enacted

Liverpool Tramways (Purchase) Act 1872
- Act of Parliament
- Parliament of the United Kingdom
- Long title: An Act to enable the Mayor, Aldermen, and Burgesses of the Borough of Liverpool to acquire certain Tramways in Liverpool; and for other purposes.
- Citation: 35 & 36 Vict. c. cxxii

Dates
- Royal assent: 18 July 1872

Other legislation
- Repealed by: Liverpool Corporation Act 1921

Status: Repealed

Liverpool Tramways Act 1875
- Act of Parliament
- Parliament of the United Kingdom
- Long title: An Act for confirming and giving effect to an Agreement between the Liverpool Tramways Company and the Mayor, Aldermen, and Burgesses of the Borough of Liverpool, with reference to certain Tramways of the Company within the said Borough; and for other purposes.
- Citation: 38 & 39 Vict. c. xlviii

Dates
- Royal assent: 14 June 1875

Other legislation
- Repealed by: Liverpool Corporation Act 1921

Status: Repealed

Text of statute as originally enacted

Liverpool Tramways Act 1880
- Act of Parliament
- Parliament of the United Kingdom
- Long title: An Act for carrying into effect an Agreement for the transfer by the Liverpool United Tramways and Omnibus Company of their Tramways in the City of Liverpool to the Corporation of Liverpool, and for the Lease of those Tramways to the Company; and for other purposes.
- Citation: 43 & 44 Vict. c. cxxvi

Dates
- Royal assent: 2 August 1880

Other legislation
- Repealed by: Liverpool Corporation Act 1921

Status: Repealed

Text of statute as originally enacted

Liverpool Tramways Act 1882
- Act of Parliament
- Parliament of the United Kingdom
- Long title: An Act to authorise the Liverpool United Tramways and Omnibus Company to construct new Tramways and to confer further powers on them with reference to other Tramways in the neighbourhood of Liverpool; and for other purposes.
- Citation: 45 & 46 Vict. c. xcii

Dates
- Royal assent: 3 July 1882

Other legislation
- Repealed by: Liverpool Corporation Act 1921

Status: Repealed

Text of statute as originally enacted

Liverpool Tramways Act 1885
- Act of Parliament
- Parliament of the United Kingdom
- Long title: An Act to authorise the Liverpool United Tramways and Omnibus Company to raise additional Capital and to confer further Powers upon them with reference to other Tramways in the Neighbourhood of Liverpool and for other purposes.
- Citation: 48 & 49 Vict. c. cxlv

Dates
- Royal assent: 31 July 1885

Other legislation
- Repealed by: Liverpool Corporation Act 1921

Status: Repealed

Text of statute as originally enacted

Liverpool Tramways Act 1892
- Act of Parliament
- Parliament of the United Kingdom
- Long title: An Act to authorise the Liverpool United Tramways and Omnibus Company to construct new Tramways and for other purposes.
- Citation: 55 & 56 Vict. c. cxxxiv

Dates
- Royal assent: 27 June 1892

Other legislation
- Repealed by: Liverpool Corporation Act 1921

Status: Repealed

The Liverpool Tramway Company obtained the Liverpool Tramways Act 1868 (31 & 32 Vict. c. clxvii) granting permission to construct an Inner Circle line and lines to Walton and Dingle. Services started at 08.00 on 1 November 1869.

By the end of 1875, the network of lines had reached 60.75 miles of tramway. Services were provided through a stable of 2,894 horses and 207 tramcars.

The Liverpool Tramways Company merged with the Liverpool Road and Railway Omnibus Company in 1876 to form the Liverpool United Tramways and Omnibus Company.

The Liverpool Corporation Tramways Act 1897 (60 & 61 Vict. c. civ) allowed Liverpool Corporation to acquire the company; services were continued by Liverpool Corporation Tramways.

== Surviving relics ==
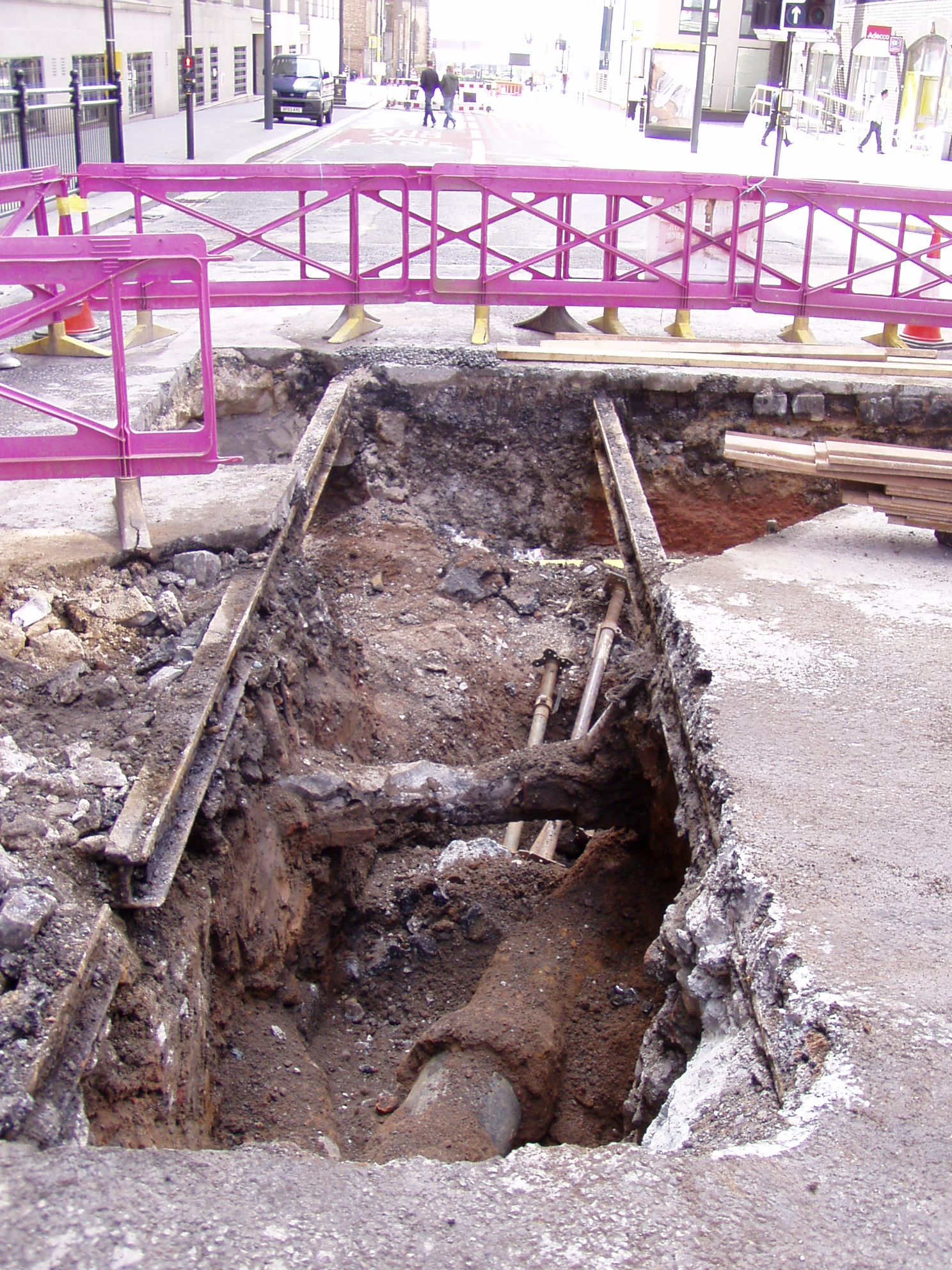
Remains of lines on Tithebarn street

Horse car 43 is held at Wirral Tramway awaiting restoration.

== See also ==
- Merseyside Passenger Transport Executive
- Merseytram – a proposal to re-introduce trams to Liverpool.
