= Wirral Transport Museum =

Transport museum in Birkenhead, Wirral, England

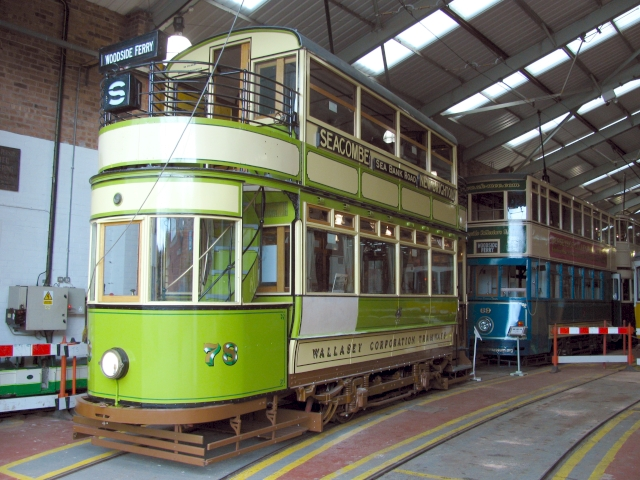
- Wallasey Corporation tram No. 78 in the tramshed, with Hong Kong tram No. 69 to the rear.
- Established: 1995
- Location: Taylor Street, Birkenhead, Merseyside. CH41 1BG; United Kingdom
- Coordinates: 53.3961°N 3.0192°W
- Type: Transport museum
- Collection size: Trams, buses, other vehicles, static displays, model railway
- Website: Wirral Transport Museum; Merseyside Tramway Preservation Society

Wirral Transport Museum was a museum situated at Woodside, Birkenhead, England.

A heritage tram line linked the museum to the ferry terminal at Woodside. The museum and tramway closed in April 2023.

In 2025, Wirral Council withdrew a £4.5m funding offer for the museum's current owners, leaving the future of the site uncertain.

== History ==
The museum was established in 1995 as the tram shed for the Wirral Tramway.

In 2009, as part of its Strategic Asset Review, owners Wirral Borough Council planned to dispose of the museum, transferring it to a Community Development Trust. It recommended that "... the specialist role of the Transport Museum be protected as far as possible."

In 2011, the museum welcomed comedian Ken Dodd, who took a ride on one of the trams for a BBC documentary.

By 2013, the council was in discussions to hand over management to a volunteer organisation. Merseyside Transport Preservation Society had been using the Taylor Street museum as a base for restoring and maintaining their collection for some time and were invited to take over the operation of the museum and tramway, which began in January 2014.

In December 2017 the museum closed for six months for a major revamp which included a new gift shop, cafe and lift, incorporating a pair of historic Mersey Ferries ticket booths into the new entrance.

The museum was operated by MTPS volunteers of behalf of Wirral Council, who revealed in 2023 that the museum and tramway were costing the council approximately £85,000 per year to maintain. An asset transfer to local museum operators Big Heritage CIC was approved in March 2023.

Big Heritage CIC were granted a 25-year lease with the stated aim of increasing visitor numbers to 40,000 a year. The museum was closed for redevelopment in April 2023, with an initial goal of doubling the museum in size and creating at least 10 new jobs. In the interim, heritage bus and tram services were expected to resume in 2024. MTPS maintained ownership of the historic tram fleet, and a breakdown in relations with Big Heritage led to them removing their tramcars in 2023-2025.

In March 2025, Wirral Council voted to withdraw £4.5m in grant funding for Big Heritage after consultants deemed the transport museum plans as 'undeliverable' within the required timescale. A smaller £1.5m offer was rejected and a legal dispute ensued, leaving the future of the tramway and museum in limbo.

== Trams ==
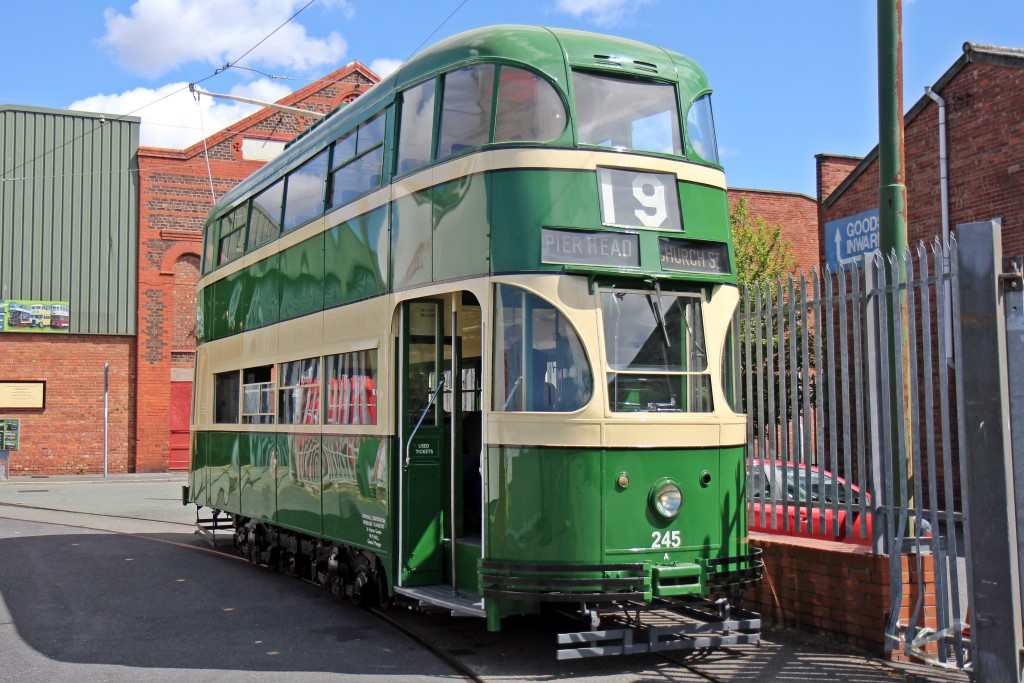
Liverpool double-decker tram No. 245, outside the museum at Taylor Street in Birkenhead

The tramway collection was set up in collaboration with volunteers from Merseyside Tramway Preservation Society. The Wirral Tramway commenced service in April 1995 with the Hong Kong-built, 1948-style units, operated under contract by Blackpool Tramways for Wirral Borough Council, who took overall control in 2005.

Hong Kong tramcar 69, which bears the name of George Francis Train & Phileas Fogg, received a new 'Prenton style' livery in 2005. Hong Kong tramcar 70, named Thomas Brassey after the well known 19th century railroad builder, has been painted in a fictional 'Birkenhead Blue' livery (which was only ever carried by the town's bus fleet after 1934).

Liverpool 245, a Baby Grand owned by National Museums Liverpool but kept at Birkenhead since 2006, was restored to operational use by the Merseyside Tramway Preservation Society. This was funded with the help of a £50,000 lottery heritage fund grant in 2010, with completion of the restoration in 2014.

Former operational trams of the fleet included Birkenhead 20, Wallasey 78, Liverpool 762 which were transferred to Crich Tramway Village in 2025 and Lisbon 730 which was moved to Beamish Museum transport collection in 2024. Horse-drawn tram Liverpool 43 was moved to Hooton Park Hangars. The partially-restored Warrington No. 28 (built from the original No. 2) owned by MTPS, remains at the former museum awaiting removal.

== Buses ==
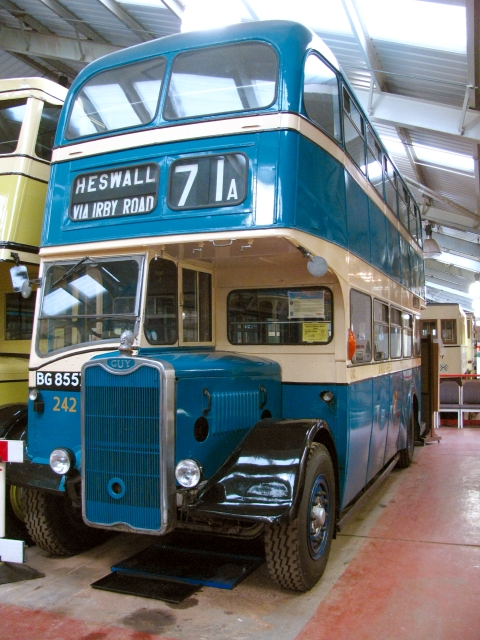
1943 Guy Arab

The Technical Custodian held a National / Standard (2) Operator Licence. Upon his retirement in January 2014 the entitlement for the museum to use vehicles on a hire and reward basis ceased; however many of the historic vehicles were maintained to a fully roadworthy status for occasional use, visiting local events and offering free tours.

Prior to the 2023 closure, the museum's bus fleet included a variety of vehicles from local operators:

=== Birkenhead Corporation ===
- BG 8557, a 1943 Guy Arab (324) rebodied in 1953 (242). Now restored with help from Paul Anderson / Home front funding, 1BG Project
- BG 9225, a 1946 Leyland Titan PD1/1a (No. 105). Restored with support of Ovaltine and match funding, 1BG Project.
- RCM 493, a 1964 Leyland Leopard L1 (No. 93). Restored by Wirral Museum / Hamilton Quarter funding.
- GCM 152E, a 1967 Leyland Titan PD2/37 (No. 152). Restored with Hamilton Quarter funding, Wirral Museums / 201 & 1BG Project.

=== Wallasey Corporation ===
- AHF 850, a 1951 Leyland Titan PD2/1 (No. 54). Preserver Cedric Greenwood (1973). Funding purchased New Wallasey, 1BG Project.
- CHF 565, a 1954 Leyland Titan PD2/10 (No. 106). Preserver Mayers. Restoration funding from New Wallasey, Wirral Museums 201 project.

=== Crosville Motor Services ===
- 319 PFM, a 1960 Bristol Lodekka / ECW FS6G Preserved by 1BG / N Moore / Wirral Museums (2007)
- DVG 487, a 1981 Bristol VR / ECW Crosville is also resident at the museum (2010)
- B200 DTU, a 1985 Leyland Olympian/ECW

=== Other waiting projects ===
- Crosville MS18 1949 Bedford Beagle. Converted Mobile Office a 1BG Project funding needed.
- HKF 820, a 1949 AEC Regent III, Liverpool A344. Preservers Bill Barlow / David Forrest. Transferred to Wirral Transport Museum in 2006.

=== Vehicles formerly on display ===
- 101 CLT, a London AEC Routemaster (RM 1101). Purchased in 1994 via A1A Travel and restored with Hamilton Quarter funding. Withdrawn in April 2009, and is now to be found operating back on London streets with theghostbustours.com. RM1101 has reverted to its KFF 367 registration.
- THM 692M, a London Transport Daimler Fleetline (DMS 1692), MCW bodywork. Purchased by Wirral Local Education Authority in 1998, it was previously used as a mobile classroom. Withdrawn in April 2009. Now to be found operating as a mobile church/youth club at Ellesmere Port, Cheshire.
- OFM 957K, a Daimler Fleetline, Chester City 75 Open Top ex 54. Sold to the North West Museum of Road Transport in January 2009.
- F362 WSC, a Leyland Olympian, Alexander 81 seat bodywork. Operational since March 2009, the vehicle was re-registered as 101 CLT on 25 April 2009. Number previously donated back to RM 1101. This vehicle replaced the Millennium bus (DMS 1692). In April 2012 It was re-registered F362 WSC and the bus placed into preservation with a Yorkshire group. Routemaster Registration 101 CLT (from RM1101 now KFF 367), was exchanged for Ribble PD3 1841 registration TCK 841 and in line with museum policy its classic bus fleet continue to display their original registrations.

== Static and other exhibits ==
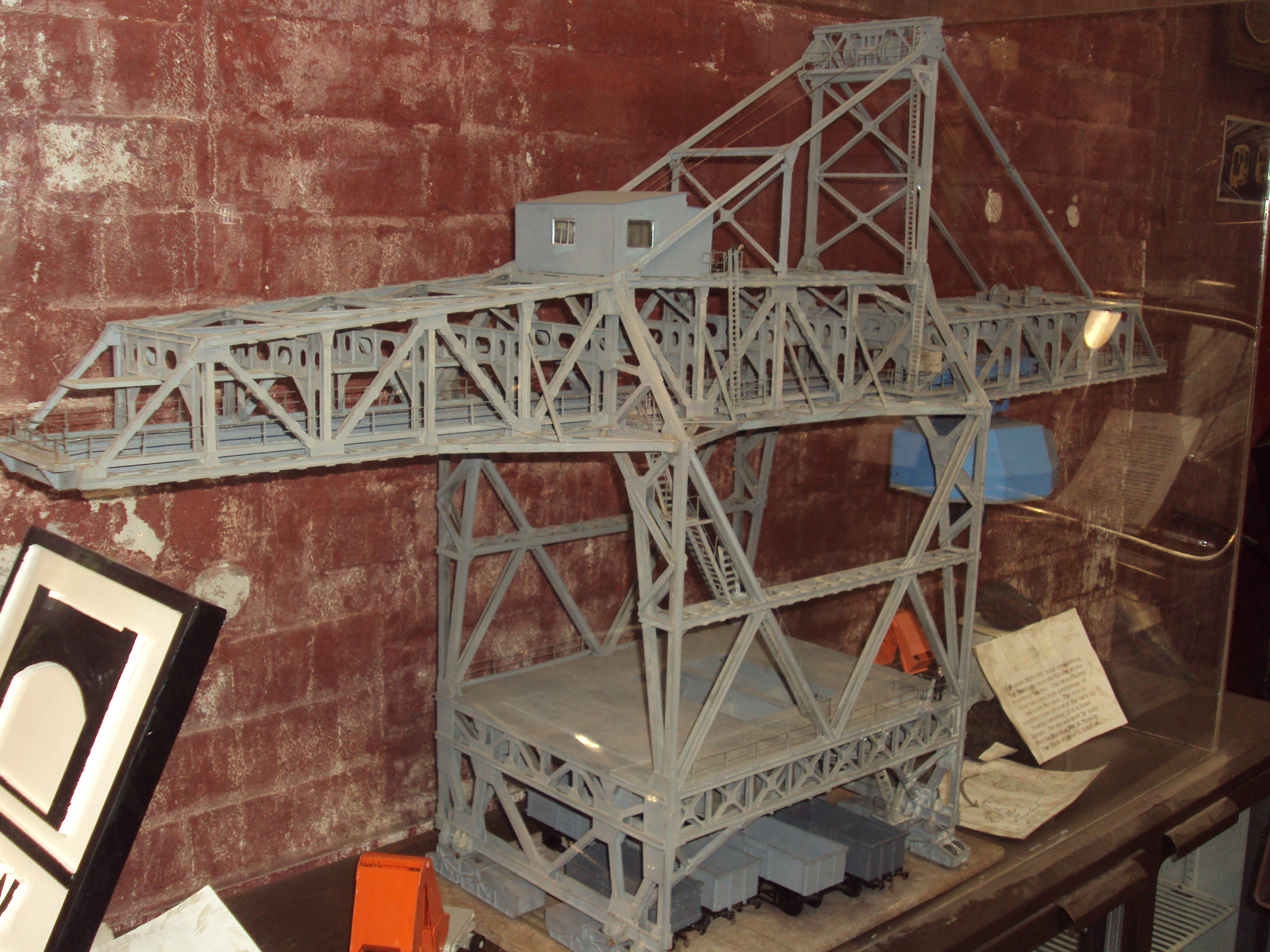
A model of one of the former Bidston Dock cranes

The museum had an extensive collection on display, the majority owned by Wirral Museums. This included various items relating to the area's transport history alongside a wide variety of scale models. A 26-foot-long (7.9 m) OO gauge model railway layout depicting Mostyn in North Wales was removed after the museum's closure. A reconstructed 1930s garage scene and a shop scene were also present.

Several vintage cars, including an Austin 1800 dating to 1970, an Austin 7, a Morris Minor Traveller, a Triumph Dolomite 1300 and a 1946 Wolseley 14-series police car formed part of the collection.

Also in the collection were various vintage motorcycles, including a BSA Bantam, a Douglas, a 1956 BSA C10L, a 1938 Norton 16H and a 1964 Honda CB92. Mopeds include a Yamaha QT50 and a 1967 Honda P50.

== See also ==
- Wirral Tramway
- Birkenhead Transport
- Birkenhead Dock Branch
