= Liverpool Corporation Tramways =

Defunct tram network in Liverpool, England

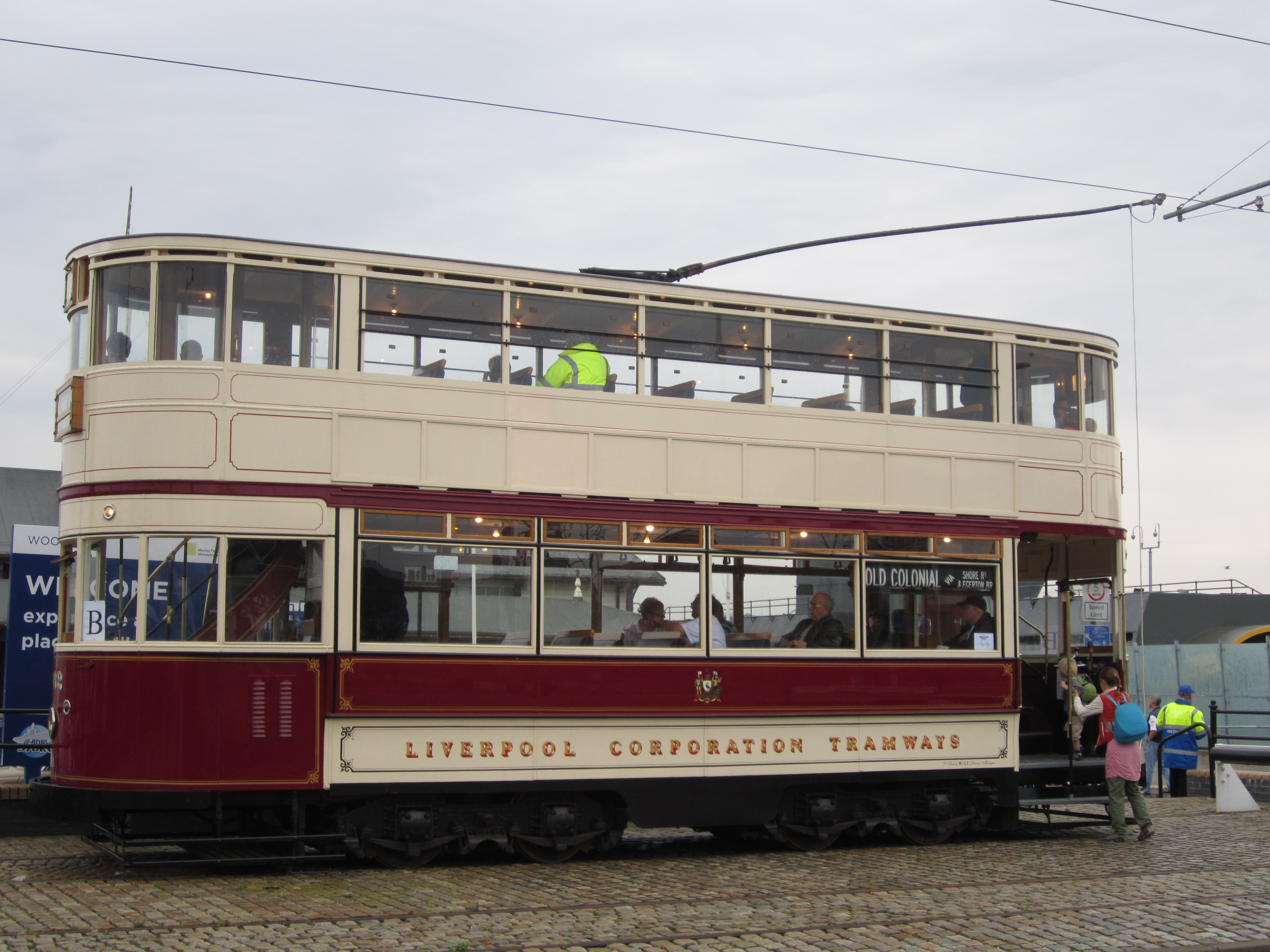
- Liverpool Corporation Tram at Woodside, Birkenhead

Operation
- Locale: Liverpool
- Open: 16 November 1898
- Close: 14 September 1957
- Status: Closed

Infrastructure
- Track gauge: 1,435 mm (4 ft 8 1/2 in)
- Propulsion system: Electric

Statistics
- Route length: 90 miles (140 km)

Liverpool Corporation Tramways operated a tramway service in Liverpool between 1898 and 1957.

At the peak of Britain’s first-generation tramways, it was possible to travel by tram all the way from Pier Head at Liverpool to the Pennines in Rochdale by tram.

== History ==
Liverpool Corporation Tramways Act 1897
- Act of Parliament
- Parliament of the United Kingdom
- Long title: An Act to authorise the Corporation of the City of Liverpool to acquire the Undertaking of the Liverpool United Tramways and Omnibus Company to confer powers on the Corporation for improving and working the undertaking and for borrowing money and for other purposes.
- Citation: 60 & 61 Vict. c. civ

Dates
- Royal assent: 15 July 1897

Other legislation
- Repealed by: County of Merseyside Act 1980

Status: Repealed

Text of statute as originally enacted

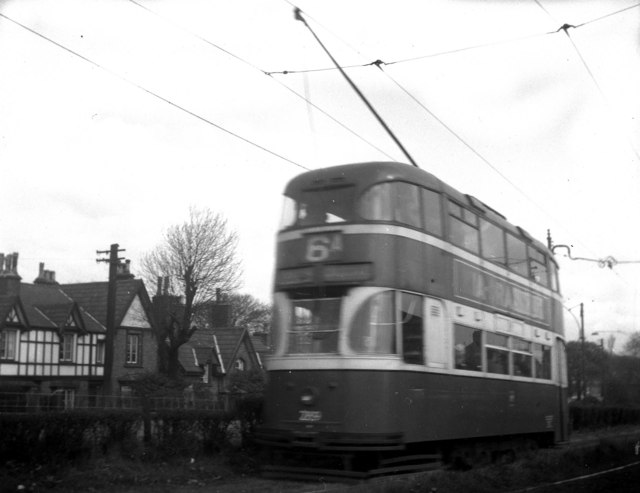
By 1957, the once-extensive Liverpool tramway system had been reduced to just two routes, the 6A to Bowring Park and the 40 to Page Moss Avenue. These routes finally closed in September. All were in a run-down and dilapidated condition, sad to see. Here is a 'Baby Grand' 4-wheel tram on the Bowring Park route.

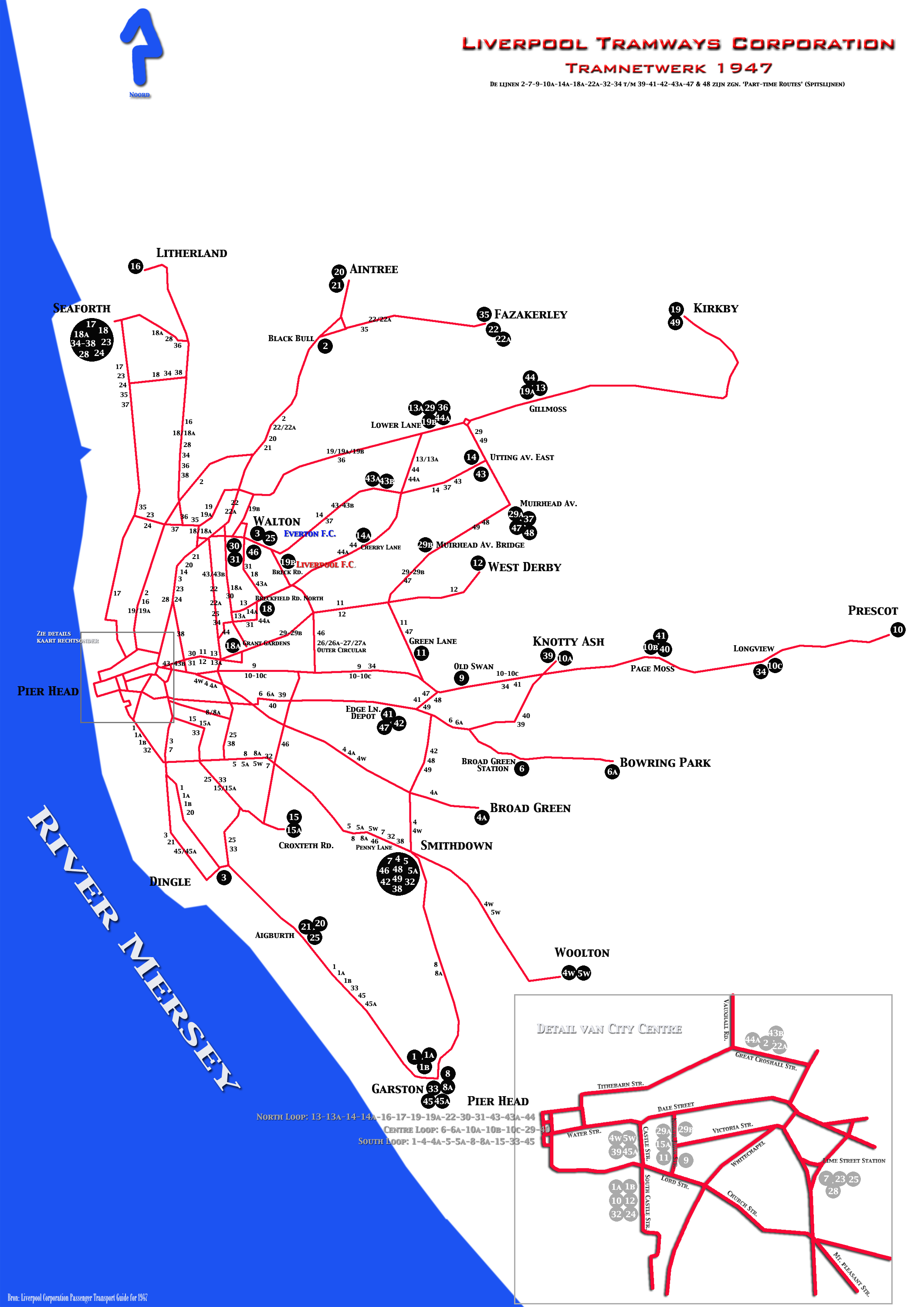
Routes in 1947

In 1897, Liverpool Corporation obtained a local act of Parliament, the Liverpool Corporation Tramways Act 1897 (60 & 61 Vict. c. civ), and bought the Liverpool United Tramway and Omnibus Company.

A modernisation scheme followed immediately with electrification of services taking around five years.

The first electric service left Dingle on 16 November 1898. By 1901, the 101 million passengers were carried by the electric tramcars.

== The last tram ==
The last tram, (Car 293 No. 6A), ran from Liverpool's Pier Head to Bowring Park on 14 September 1957.

The car was bought by the Seashore Trolley Museum of Kennebunkport, Maine, U.S. and shipped via Boston, Massachusetts in 1958. As of 2017, it is currently at the back of a shed at the Museum, and in poor condition.

== Surviving trams ==
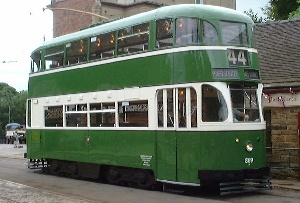
Liverpool 869 seen at the National Tramway Museum.

Horse car 43 is a static exhibit at the Wirral Transport Museum in Birkenhead.

Car 293 survives at the Seashore Trolley Museum in Kennebunkport, Maine, United States of America.

Car 245 was restored to operational condition in 2014, by members of the Merseyside Tramway Preservation Society at the Wirral Transport Museum in Birkenhead, and is operational at the Wirral Tramway.

Car 762 was restored at the Wirral Tramway where it operated on a regular basis. In March 2025 it moved to the National Tramway Museum.

Car 869 (known as a "Streamliner" or "Liner" in original Liverpool service, and "Green Goddess" in later Glasgow service) is part of the operational fleet at the National Tramway Museum at Crich in Derbyshire.
