= Birkenhead Transport =

Bus operator in Birkenhead

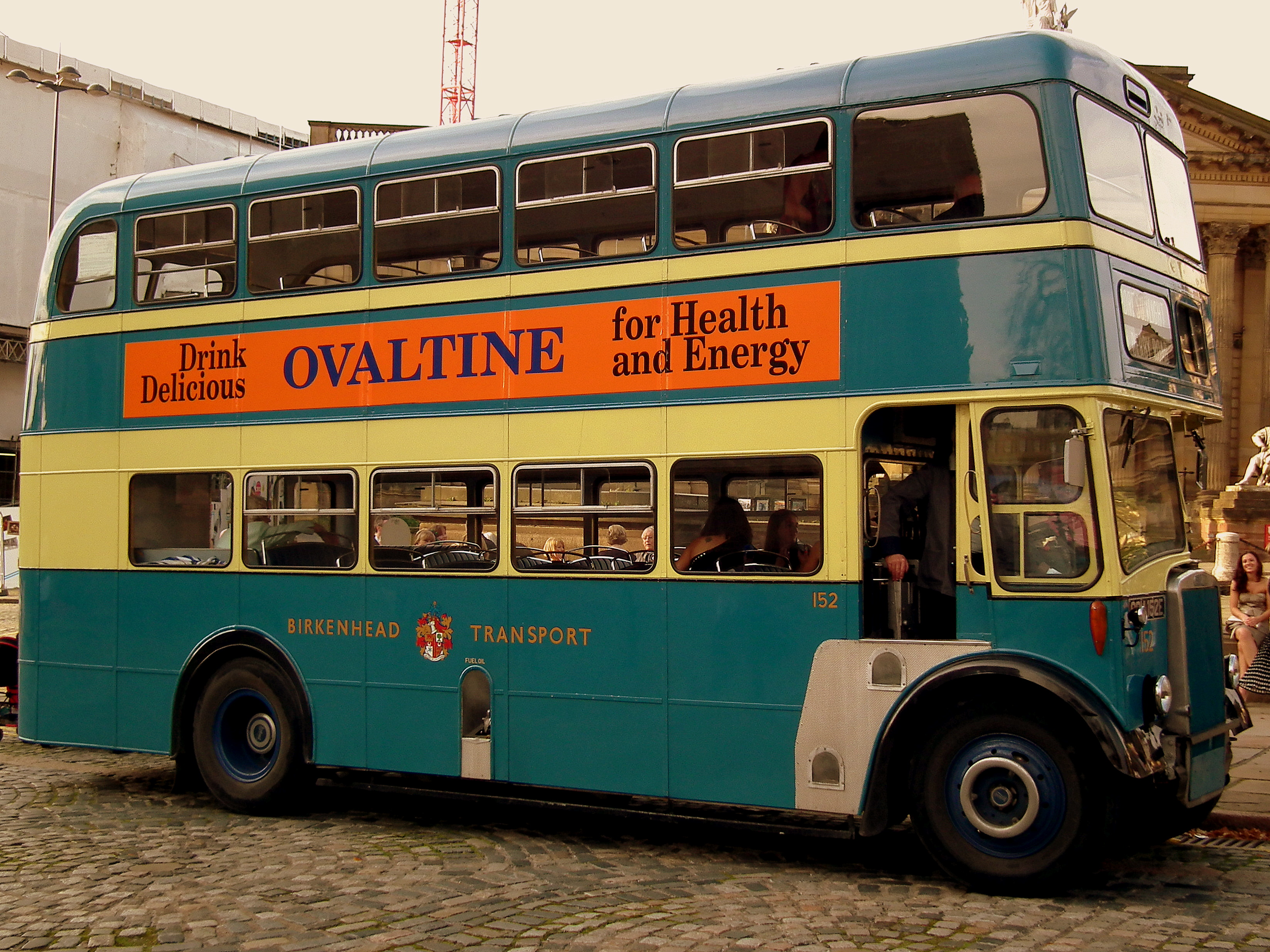
- Preserved Massey bodied Leyland Titan in September 2011
- Parent: Corporation of Birkenhead
- Founded: 12 July 1919
- Ceased operation: 1 December 1969
- Service area: Birkenhead
- Service type: Bus operator

Birkenhead Transport was a bus operator in Birkenhead. It commenced operating on 12 July 1919 with a service from Rock Ferry to Birkenhead Park station, this service was extended to Moreton in the August of that year. The buses supplemented an earlier tram service.

In 1860, Birkenhead on the Wirral Peninsula had become the first town in Europe to operate a street tramway. It was started by George Francis Train, an American, when he laid track from Woodside Ferry to Birkenhead Park Main Entrance and ran a horse drawn car service. On 4 February 1901, the Corporation of Birkenhead owned Birkenhead Corporation Tramways commenced operating, first to New Ferry and later around the town. It closed on 17 July 1937.

== Livery ==
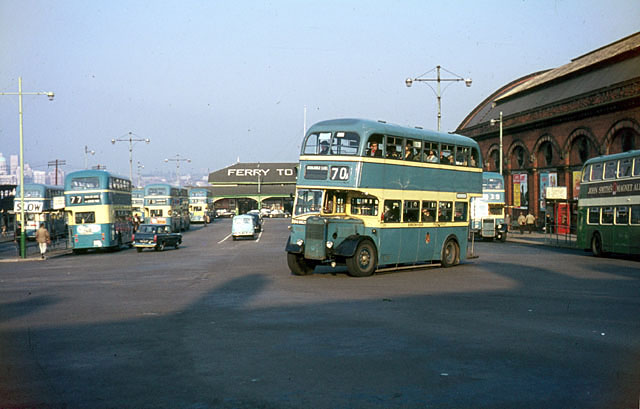
Birkenhead Transport buses at Woodside Ferry Terminal in September 1966

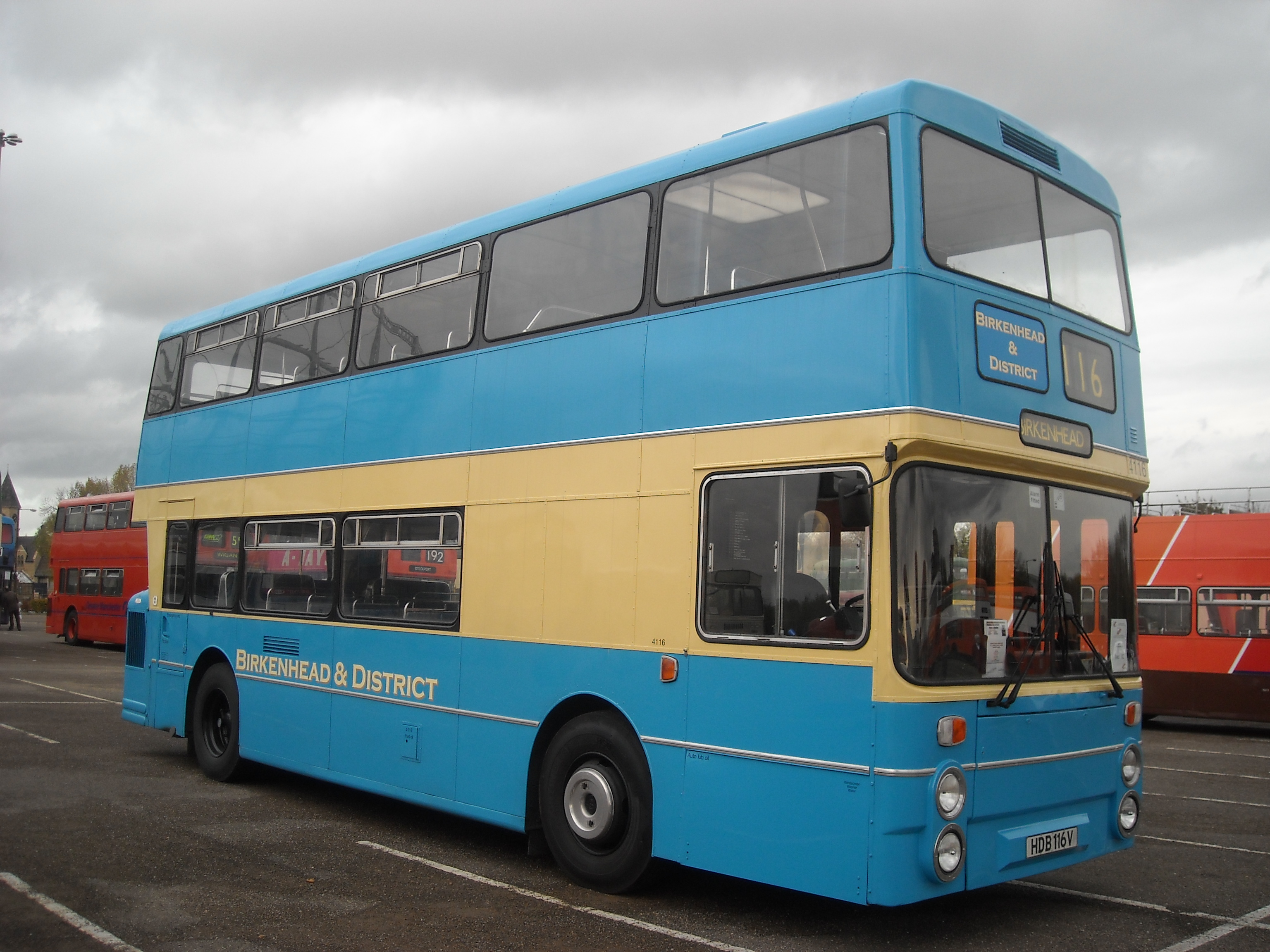
Preserved GM Buses Birkenhead & District liveried Northern Counties bodied Daimler Fleetline in October 2009

Birkenhead's first livery on trams and buses was maroon and cream with a white roof, but in 1934 Birkenhead's famous blue and cream livery was applied to a new AEC Q-type double-deck bus. It was the only one of its type operated by the corporation but the blue and cream livery was applied to all future delivered buses with Birkenhead Corporation Motors applied in gold on the lower cream band.

In 1951, the Transport Department was reorganised, with the bus and ferry departments merging. A slight livery change gave more cream coverage around the lower deck windows and the legend was changed to read Birkenhead Transport. White roofs had been overpainted blue during the war and with this revised livery the white roof was never re-applied. The blue was named Cerulean by the paint makers "Docker Bros of 1935", and the cream was the same as applied to the trams, named Birkenhead Corporation Cream.

== Fleet ==
During the 1950s and 1960s the average size of the Birkenhead fleet was 225 buses, the last traditional British half cab buses delivered to Birkenhead in 1967 were 15 Leyland Titan PD2/37 models with Massey 66 seat bodywork. Massey Brothers bodywork had been frequently selected by the Transport Department since 1931.

== Merger ==
On 1 December 1969, the municipal fleets of Liverpool, Birkenhead and Wallasey came together as a result of the Transport Act 1968, to form the Merseyside Passenger Transport Executive.

== Revival ==
In 1994, the brand and livery were revived by GM Buses when it was engaged in bus war with MTL. It ceased in June 1995.

== See also ==
- Wirral Transport Museum
- List of bus operators of the United Kingdom
