= Manors Power Station =

Former power station in Newcastle upon Tyne, England

Tramway Generating Station
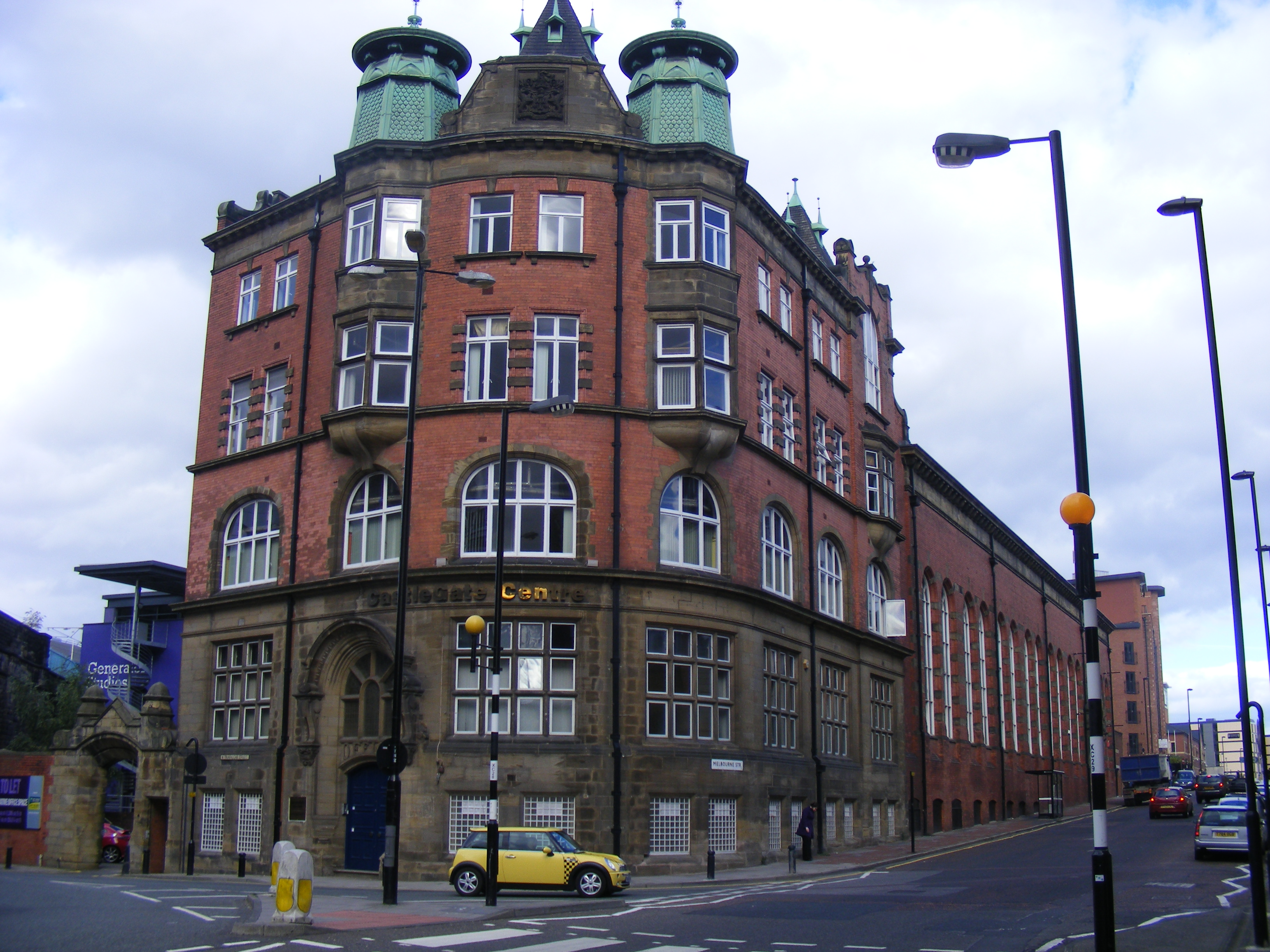
- Manors Power Station in 2009
- Official name: Manors Power Station
- Country: England
- Location: Tyne and Wear, North East England
- Coordinates: 54.9721°N 1.6050°W
- Commission date: 1901
- Decommission date: 1936
- Operator: Newcastle Corporation

Thermal power station
- Primary fuel: Coal

External links
- Commons: Related media on Commons

Manors Power Station or the Tramways Generating Station is a former coal-fired power station located in the Manors district of the city centre of Newcastle upon Tyne, Tyne and Wear in North East England. The station's turbine hall and other remaining buildings are Grade II listed.

== History ==
The station was commissioned by the Newcastle Corporation to supply electricity to the Newcastle Corporation Tramways system, that was in the process of electrification, and to contain the organisation's offices. Construction of the station was initially delayed by a bricklayer's strike, but laying of the building's foundations commenced on 14 January 1900. The construction of the station was completed in 1904.

The station generated electricity until 1936. The origins of this action dated from the 1920s. A parliamentary report by Lord Weir led to the Electricity (Supply) Act 1926 (repealed 1989), which created the Central Electricity Board and the National Grid operating at 132 kV (50 Hz). Manors Power Station was deemed too small in generating capacity and its associated plant operated at 40 Hz. Thus it suffered the same fate as many other municipal power stations and ceased generation.

However, it was still retained for electrical function. The introduction of the Newcastle Corporation's trolleybus system, together with the commissioning of new electrically-driven cranes on the Corporation-owned Newcastle Quayside in the 1930s, turned the Manors site into the central control point for the many suburban substations used by the trolleybuses. These substations took the 6 kV AC distributed from Manors and transformed and rectified this to the 550 V DC used by the trolleybuses and rapidly diminishing tram fleet. Manors itself became a substation and supplied the city centre area with the DC power for the trolleybuses and Quayside cranes. The electrically-operated lifts used on the Tyne Bridge were supplied by Manors station.

== Operations ==
The coal burned in the station's boilers was delivered to the station by rail from Trafalgar South Yard, on the East Coast Main Line at Argyle Street. From here the hoppered waggons were moved along a high timber and steel staith from which they could discharge the coal directly into bunkers above the boilers. From these bunkers it was fed by automatic weighing machines into automatic stokers.

Circulating water used in the station's surface condensers was taken from the River Tyne, which was around 0.2 miles (0.32 km) from the station and at around 90 feet (27 m) below the level of the station's engines. A pump house was located on the river's quay wall, to pump water to the station. Two 24 inches (610 mm) diameter pipes ran between the station and the pump house, one for sending water up to the station, the other for discharging it back into the river.

== Design and specification ==
The station was designed by architect Benjamin Simpson. Its engine and boiler house are large ornate steel framed, brick clad buildings, decorated with stained glass and panelling.

In the station's boiler house were eight Lancashire boilers, each 30 feet (9.1 m)long and 8 feet (2.4 m) in diameter. They were fitted with economisers and natural draught, working at a pressure of 160 psi. Flue gasses from the boilers were discharged through a 177 feet (54 m) tall brick built chimney.

In the station's engine house were three marine-type reciprocating steam engines, fitted with Corliss valves, surface condensers and Edward air pumps. Two of the engines had a rating of 1,000 horsepower (HP), while the third had a rating of 2,000 HP. Each engine was directly connected to a DC dynamo, which produced electricity at a pressure of 500 Volts (V). From here electricity was provided for the Newcastle Corporation Tramways system via a large switch board at the station. The same switchboard also fed power to the arc lighting in the city.

The technology being used at the station was considered to be obsolete at the time of opening and the original prime movers were replaced in 1908 by four Parsons turbo generators.

== Post-closure and present ==
The station was used as an air-raid shelter during the Second World War. After cessation of its electrical function for the corporation's trolleybus system in October 1966, the City Lighting department continued to use the building as a maintenance centre. The 60 ft (18 m) high turbine hall was stripped of its electrical plant and was used as an indoor car park. During the construction of the city's Metro system in the 1970s, a full size mock up Metro station was constructed in the turbine hall for training purposes. The building then passed into the ownership of Stagecoach, who used it as their regional headquarters. The building was then bought by Christian group City Church. It has been used as a meeting place by the group since October 1997, and has been renamed The CastleGate. The renovation began in May 2000, and was completed 18 months later, with the inaugural service on 3 November 2001. A 50 tonnes (49.21 long tons; 55.12 short tons) overhead crane, capable of lifting up to 5 tonnes (4.921 long tons; 5.512 short tons), is still in place in the turbine hall. As well as this, old tiles, metal galleries where workers kept check on the turbines, and old stained glass windows depicting trams, have all been kept. The building was extended in 2002, with the construction of the Generator Studios office space. This was further expanded with the construction of Generator2. Construction work began in March 2008, with completion expected for 2009.
