= Wallasey Corporation Tramways =

Tramway operator in England

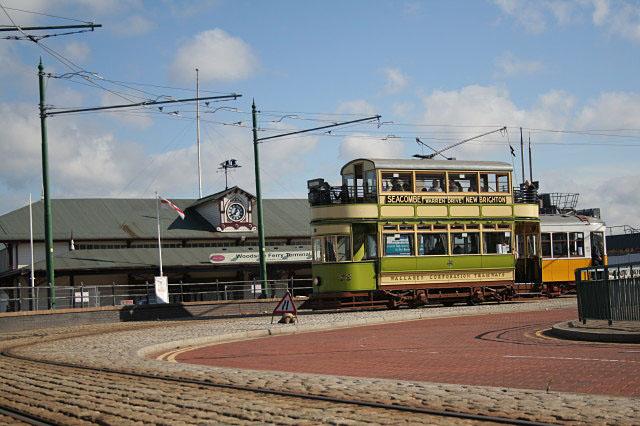
- Wallasey tram 78 on the Wirral Tramway

Operation
- Locale: Wallasey
- Open: 17 March 1902
- Close: 30 November 1933
- Status: Closed

Infrastructure
- Track gauge: 4 ft 8 1/2 in (1,435 mm)
- Propulsion system: Electric
- Depot: Seaview Road

Statistics
- Route length: 12.025 miles (19.352 km)

Wallasey Corporation Tramways operated an electric tramway service in Wallasey between 1902 and 1933.

== History ==
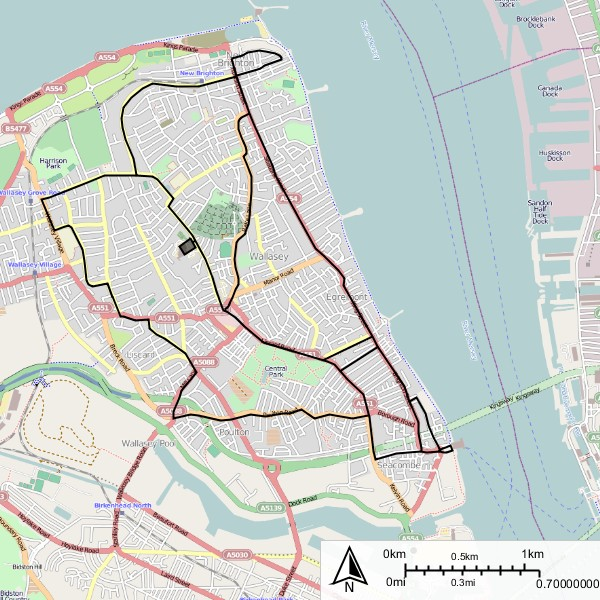
Wallasey Corporation Tramways

Wallasey Corporation Tramways was a direct successor of the Wallasey United Tramway and Omnibus Company, which had provided horse-drawn tramway services in Wallasey since 1879. The Wallasey Tramways and Improvements Act 1899 (62 & 63 Vict. c. xv) gave the corporation the power to obtain the tramway company, which it did on 1 April 1901 for the price of £20,500 (equivalent to £2,178,533 in 2025).. This included seven 34-seater double deck tramcars, and 78 horses.

The corporation relaid the track and on 17 March 1902, the first line was opened, from Seacombe Ferry to New Brighton Ferry via Wheatland. Two days later the direct route from Seacombe to New Brighton via Seabank Road was opened, replacing a horse-drawn omnibus service.

On 17 May 1902 a third line was opened from Seacombe to New Brighton via Brighton Drive, Church Street, Liscard Road, Seaview Road and Warren Drive.

The depot was in Seaview Road.

The contractor for the system was R.W. Blackwell and Co.

== Fleet ==
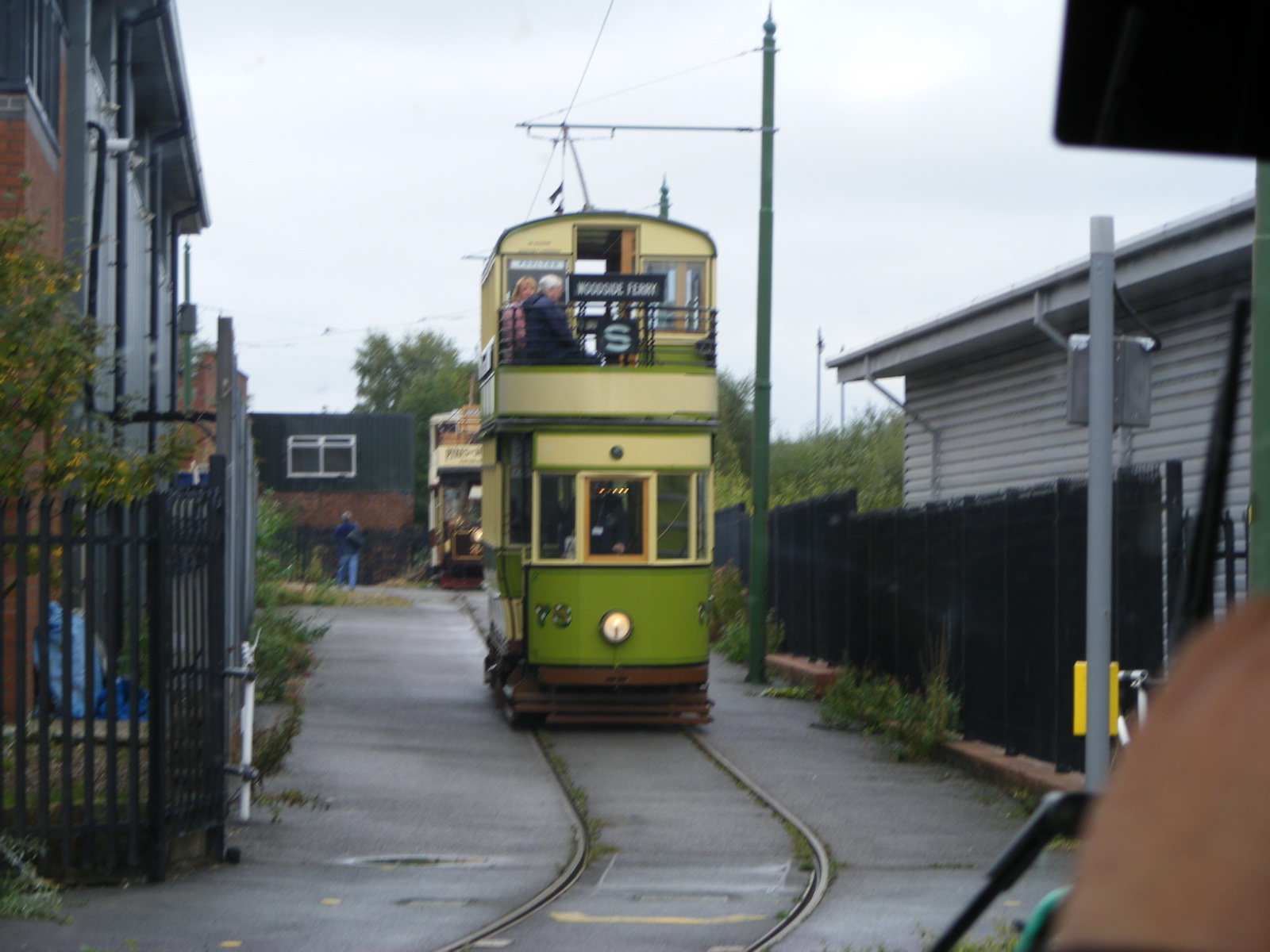
Car 78

The Wallasey tramway rolling stock consisted at maximum of 78 cars which were delivered at intervals between 1902 and 1920. Since the picture is of car 78, this was the last tram to be delivered, this was in 1920 and ran in the town for 13 years. Following restoration Wallasey 78 ran on the Wirral Tramway for longer than it did on its original line. In March 2025 the tram was moved to the national tramway museum at Crich, Derbyshire.

== Closure ==
The decline set in on 20 January 1929 when the Seabank Road service was withdrawn. There were subsequent closures and re-organisations until the whole system was closed on 30 November 1933. The legal powers were abandoned by the Wallasey Corporation Tramways (Cesser of Power) Order 1934 (SR&O 1934/354).

Car 78 was preserved at the Wirral Transport Museum until moved to the National Tramway Museum in March 2025.
