= Newcastle Corporation Tramways =

Tramway operator in England

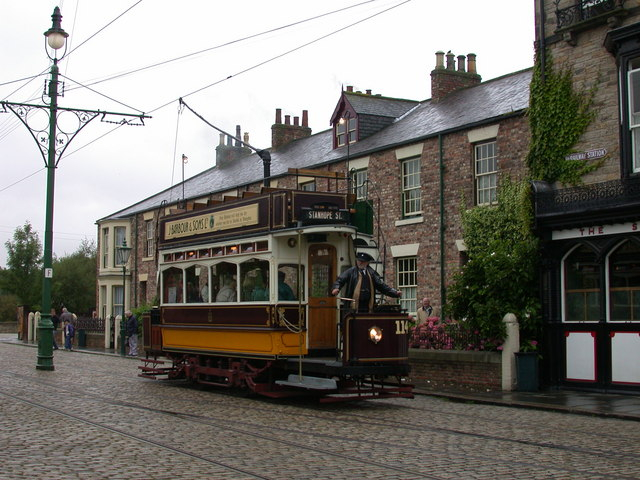
- Newcastle tram No. 114 at Beamish Museum

Operation
- Locale: Newcastle upon Tyne
- Open: 16 December 1901
- Close: 4 March 1950
- Status: Closed
- Owner: Newcastle Corporation
- Operator: Newcastle Corporation

Infrastructure
- Track gauge: 1,435 mm (4 ft 8 1/2 in)
- Propulsion system: Electric
- Electrification: 550 V DC overhead
- Depots: Byker; Haymarket; Wingrove Road

Statistics
- Route length: 51 miles (82 km)

Newcastle Corporation Tramways operated a tramway service in Newcastle upon Tyne between 1901 and 1950.

== History ==
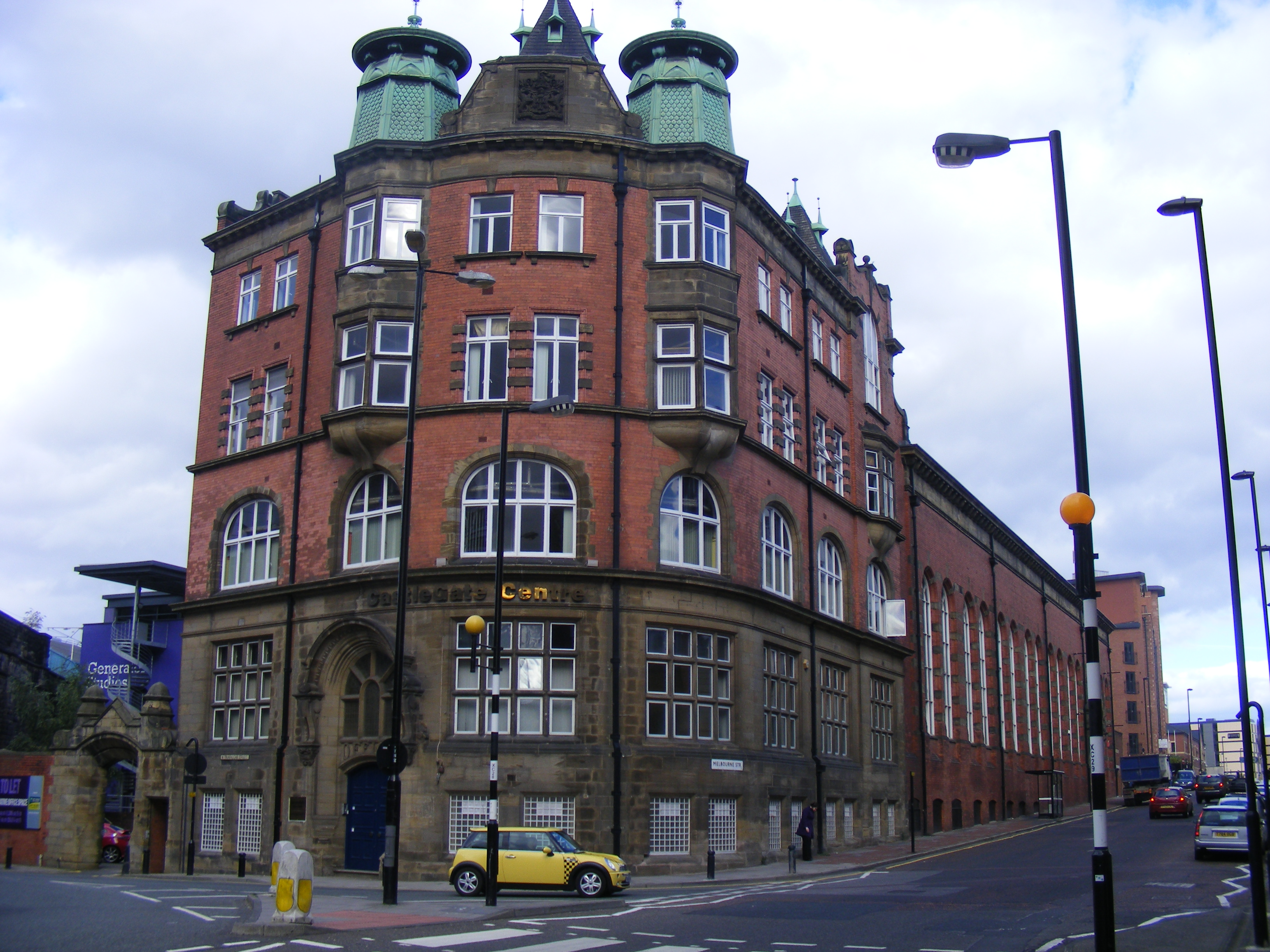
Manors Power Station

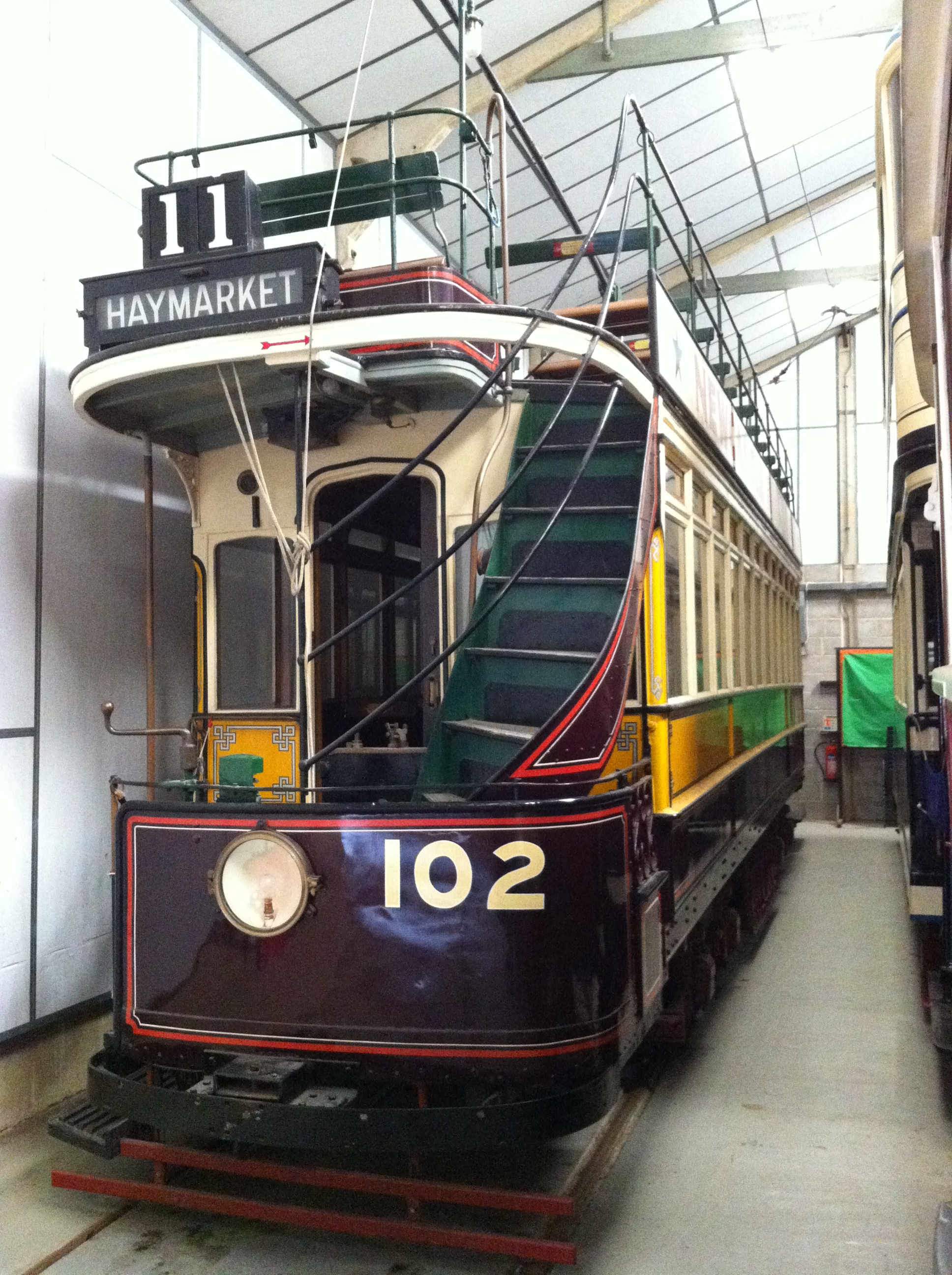
Tramcar 102 preserved at the National Tramway Museum

Services began on 16 December 1901. A fleet of twenty ‘A- Class’ tramcars built in 1901 by Hurst Nelson and Co. Ltd. of Motherwell were used in Newcastle. The main routes were complete by 1904. Newcastle Corporation built Manors Power Station to supply electricity to the new tramway system.

There were three depots, Byker, Haymarket and Wingrove Road. The Wingrove Road Depot was closed on 3 June 1944, followed by the Haymarket depot in April 1948.

Later extensions were made to Fenham in 1907, Shieldfield 1912, and Throckley 1914. The name was changed in 1915 to Newcastle Corporation Transport and Electricity Undertaking. Progress was limited during the First World War but the tramway eventually reached Forest Hall, Westmoor, and Gosforth Park in 1921. In 1925 it reached Westerhope and in 1926 it went to Denton Burn.

By 1928 there were 300 trams in service. The tram network was gradually converted to bus and trolleybus operations from the 1930s. By 1945 there were 220 trams still in use.

== Closure ==
The system finally closed on 4 March 1950. Some tram services continued to be operated until 4 August 1951 by the Gateshead and District Tramways Company.
