= Birkenhead Corporation Tramways =

British street tramway service operator (1901-1937)

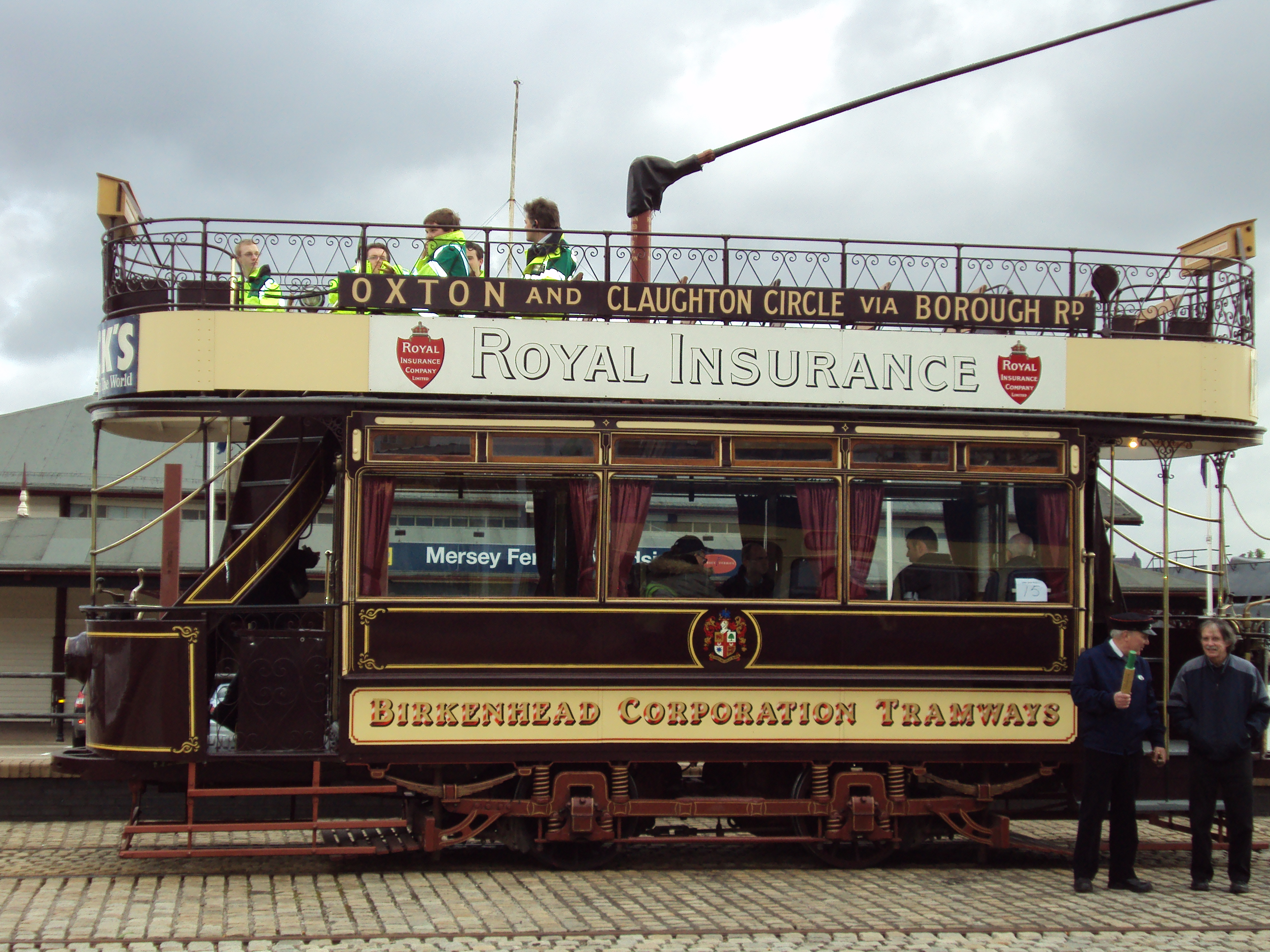

Operation
- Locale: Birkenhead, Wirral Peninsula
- Open: 4 February 1901
- Close: 17 July 1937
- Status: Closed

Infrastructure
- Track gauge: 1,435 mm (4 ft 8 1/2 in)
- Propulsion system: Electric

Statistics
- Route length: 79.08 miles (127.27 km)

Birkenhead Corporation Tramways operated a tramway service in Birkenhead between 1901 and 1937.

== History ==
In 1860, Birkenhead started the first street tramway in Britain, shortly before London.

The Birkenhead Corporation Tramway company was formed through the acquisition of the Birkenhead United Tramways, Omnibus and Carriage Company (known as Birkenhead Street Railway Company Limited 1860-1877, Birkenhead Tramways Company 1877-1890) on 31 December 1900, and the Wirral Tramway Company on 8 May 1901, and the Birkenhead United Tramways Company on 24 January 1901.

Electrification of the system was undertaken and 44 tramcars were ordered from G. F. Milnes & Co. and built locally in their factory at Birkenhead. Services started on 4 February 1901.

== Closure ==
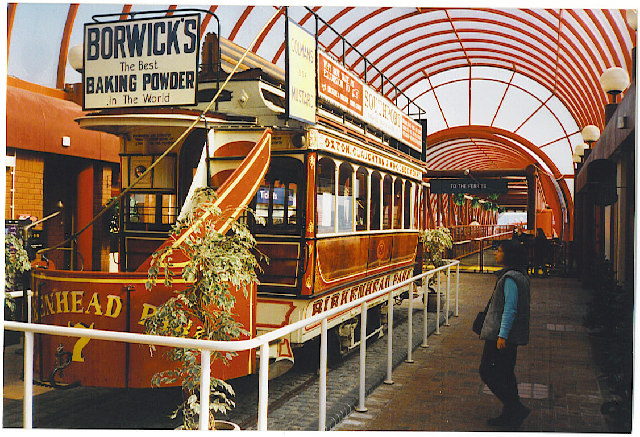
Car No 7 previously preserved on static display in the Mersey Ferry Terminal, now at Wirral Transport Museum

The first closure was on 30 August 1925, when the Claughton Road route was converted to bus operation.

The remaining routes were closed over successive years until the system finally closed on 17 July 1937.

Car No 7 is preserved on static display at the Wirral Transport Museum in Birkenhead.

Car No. 20 is preserved having been restored and operated at the Wirral Tramway. In March 2025 No.20 was moved to the National Tramway Museum at Crich, Derbyshire.
