= Gateshead and District Tramways Company =

Tramway operator in England

Gateshead and District Tramways
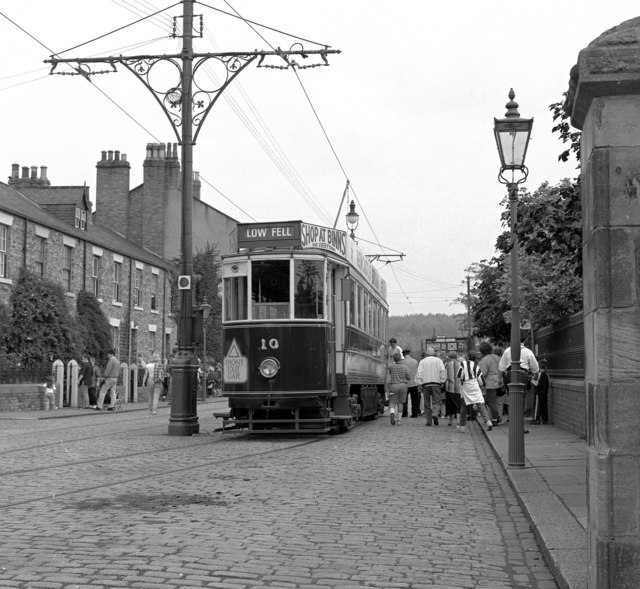
- Car 10 preserved at the Beamish Museum

Operation
- Locale: Gateshead
- Open: 22 October 1883
- Close: 4 August 1951
- Status: Closed

Infrastructure
- Track gauge: 1,435 mm (4 ft 8 1/2 in)
- Propulsion systems: Steam, then Electric

Statistics
- Route length: 12.47 miles (20.07 km)

The Gateshead and District Tramways operated a tramway service in Gateshead between 1883 and 1951.

== History ==
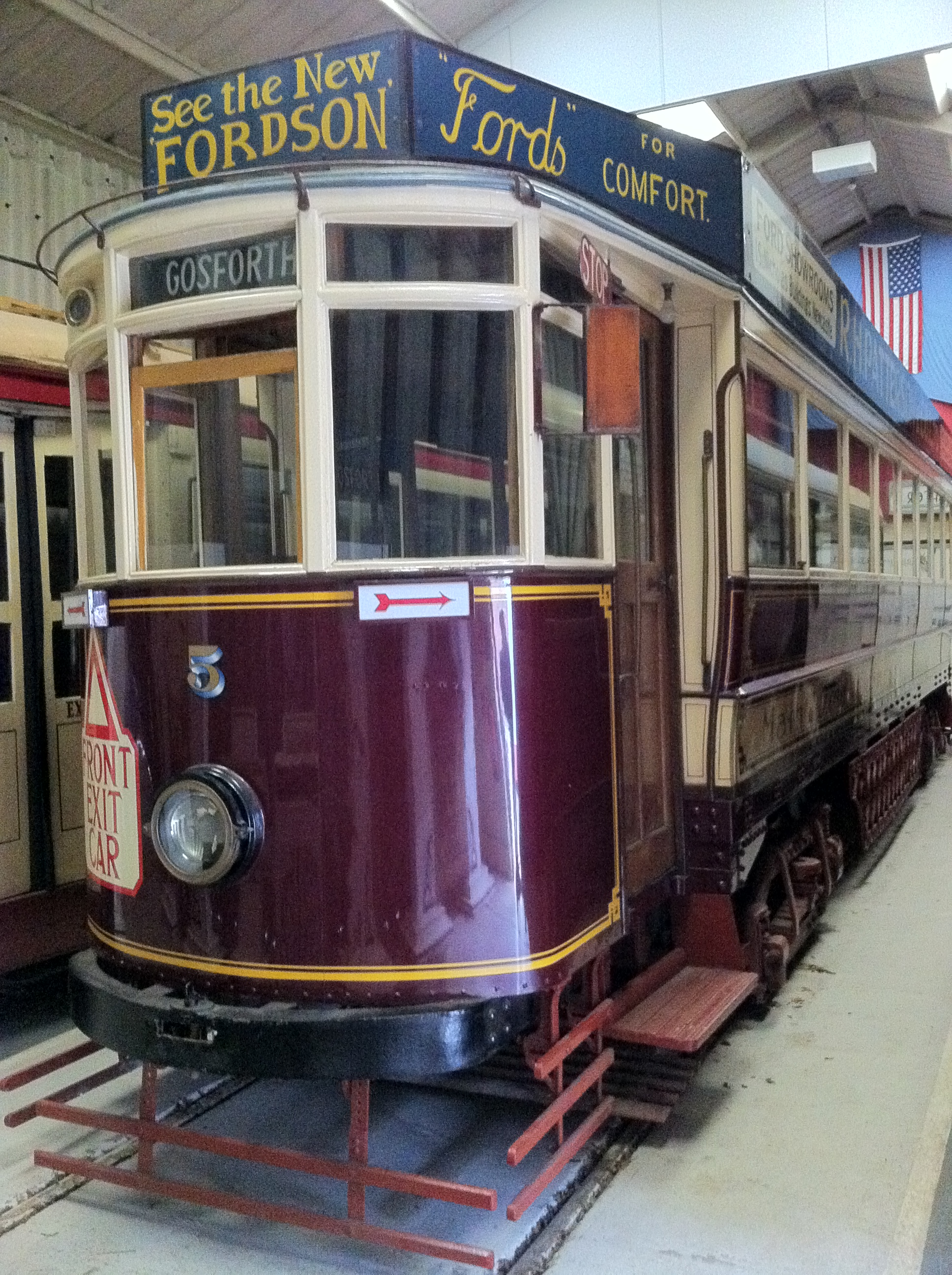
Tramcar 5 at the National Tramway Museum

The Gateshead and District Tramways commenced services on 22 October 1883 with steam-hauled tramcars operating on three routes centred on Gateshead High Street.

Gateshead and District Tramways Act 1899
- Act of Parliament
- Parliament of the United Kingdom
- Long title: An Act to enable the Gateshead and District Tramways Company to lay down and maintain additional tramways and works and for other purposes.
- Citation: 62 & 63 Vict. c. ccxlviii

Dates
- Royal assent: 9 August 1899

In 1897, British Electric Traction took ownership of the company and the Gateshead and District Tramways Act 1899 (62 & 63 Vict. c. ccxlviii) authorised the modernisation and electrification of the system.

Electric services started on 8 May 1901.

On 5 February 1916, a runaway tram crushed a family of three and a soldier, home on leave due to injuries received in France, on Bensham Hill. The crashed occurred when the tram's driver, who was aged 20, left his tram to aid his colleagues in a oncoming tram in which a fight was occurring. Whilst the driver was away from his tram, more passengers boarded, causing the tram to roll back and run away. The tram driver was acquitted of manslaughter at Durham Assizes.

On 12 January 1923, through running to the Newcastle Corporation Tramways was possible across the North Eastern Railway's High Level Bridge over the Tyne.

== Closure ==
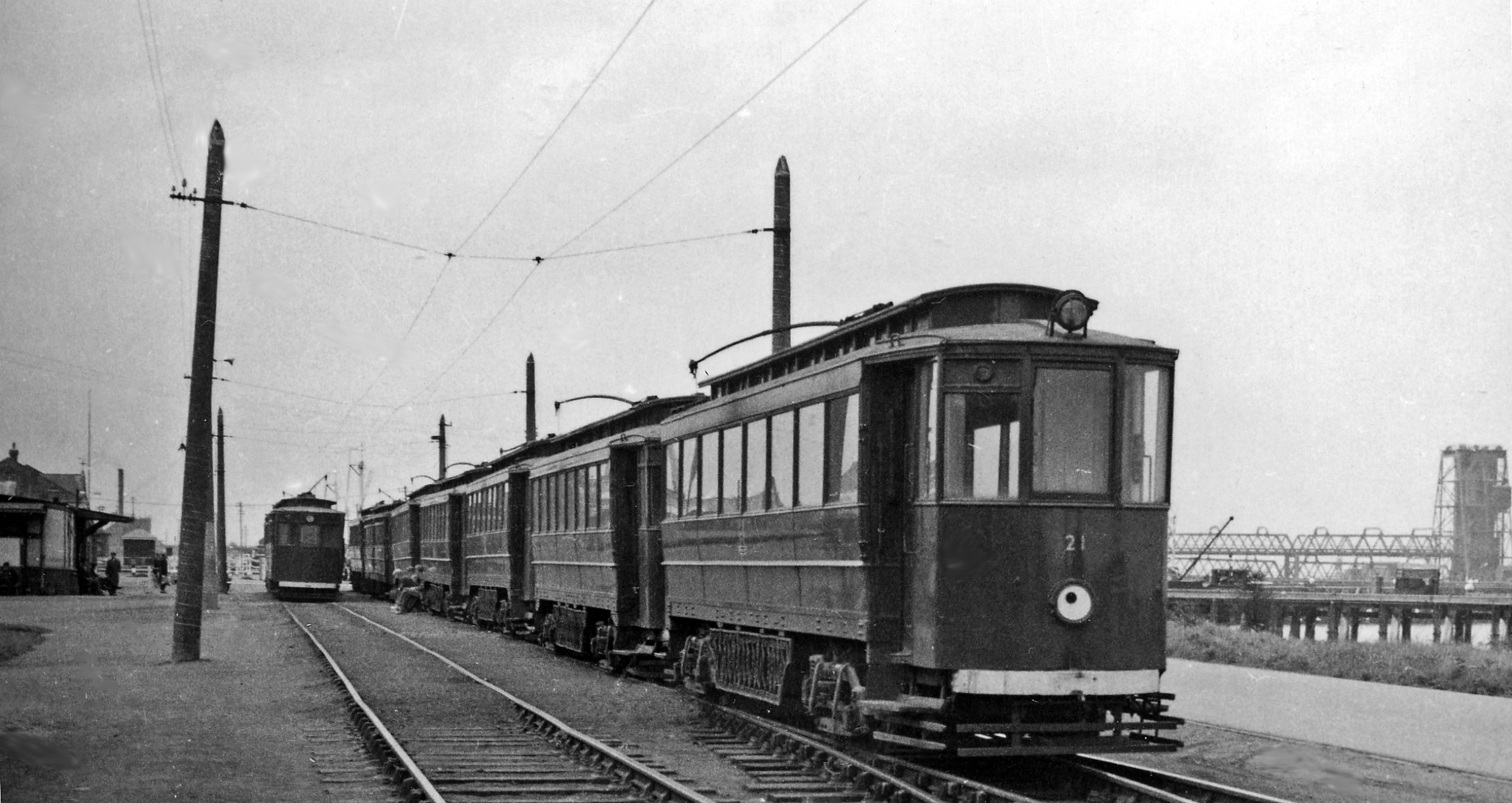
Ex Gateshead and District Tramways cars on the Grimsby and Immingham Electric Railway

The last tram operated on 4 August 1951. Several tramcars survived the closure. Nineteen cars were sold to the Grimsby and Immingham Electric Railway. Two of these survived into preservation. No 5 is at the National Tramway Museum and No 10 is at the Beamish Museum.
