= Yamaha QT50 =

Moped

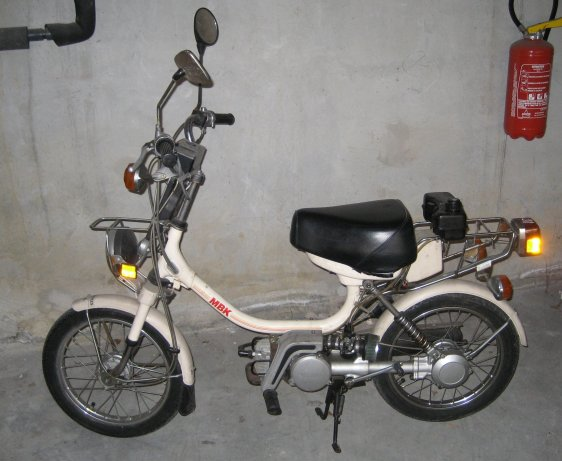
CT50 – a Yamaha QT50 marketed by the French company MBK

The Yamaha QT50 Yamahopper was a moped produced by the Yamaha Motor Company from 1979 through 1992. These small mopeds are easy to ride, maintain, are fuel efficient (135mpg) and were quite popular during its day. Being so small, it has a "maximum loading" limit of around 186lbs, although that figure can be stretched at the cost of performance. The two-stroke, 49cc single-cylinder engine was almost square, with a bore of 40mm, stroke, 39.2mm; making riding legal without a motorcycle license in some states because its engine is under 50cc. It included turn signals, a solid state CD ignition, front and rear luggage carriers and drum brakes at each end. Compression ratio was 6:1. The carburetor VM12S was a Mikuni VM12SC, running fuel through a reed valve. The valve’s bending: 0.8mm. Yamaha’s Autolube system made sure the gas and oil mixture was close to perfect. The QT50 resembles contemporary mopeds yet shares some features with scooters.

The QT50 and the Honda Express are similar in appearance. Unlike most scooters, the QT50 has no fairing, sports footpegs rather than footboards, and its engine is slung beneath the monotube frame motorcycle-style. The Yamahopper has an approximate top speed of 30mph in stock form, and thus can be used for city driving.

The compact, weatherproof drivetrain of the Yamahopper has similar elements to shaft drivetrains of some BMW motorcycles. Its simple, maintenance-free shaft-drive contained in the single-sided swingarm eliminates chain maintenance, increases safety, decreases wear concerns as well as weather wear factors and contributes to the durability and ease of use of these tiny motorbikes. The drive unit also incorporates a traditional centrifugal clutch but only a single speed gearing, unlike some mopeds which have two speeds. The simplified driveshaft setup makes wheel changes easy.

Popular modifications include: Yamaha YT60 cylinder, piston and rings; Yamaha MJ50 Towny two-speed crankcase and right-side swingarm; Yamaha PW50 rear gears; Mikuni VM15 and VM18 carburetors; and Jemco exhaust.

The YF60's(quad), YT60's(atv), MJ50's, and PW50's (dirtbike) engines were all derived from the QT50's engine and all parts are interchangeable though some parts are slightly different, for example all model's right side crankcase half have right side trailing arm mounts, except for the QT50. Most of the parts for the QT50 are still available from Yamaha dealers. New and used parts are often found on eBay as well.
