= Wirral Tramway =

Heritage tramway running through Birkenhead, Wirral, England

Coordinates: 53.395109°N 3.01°W

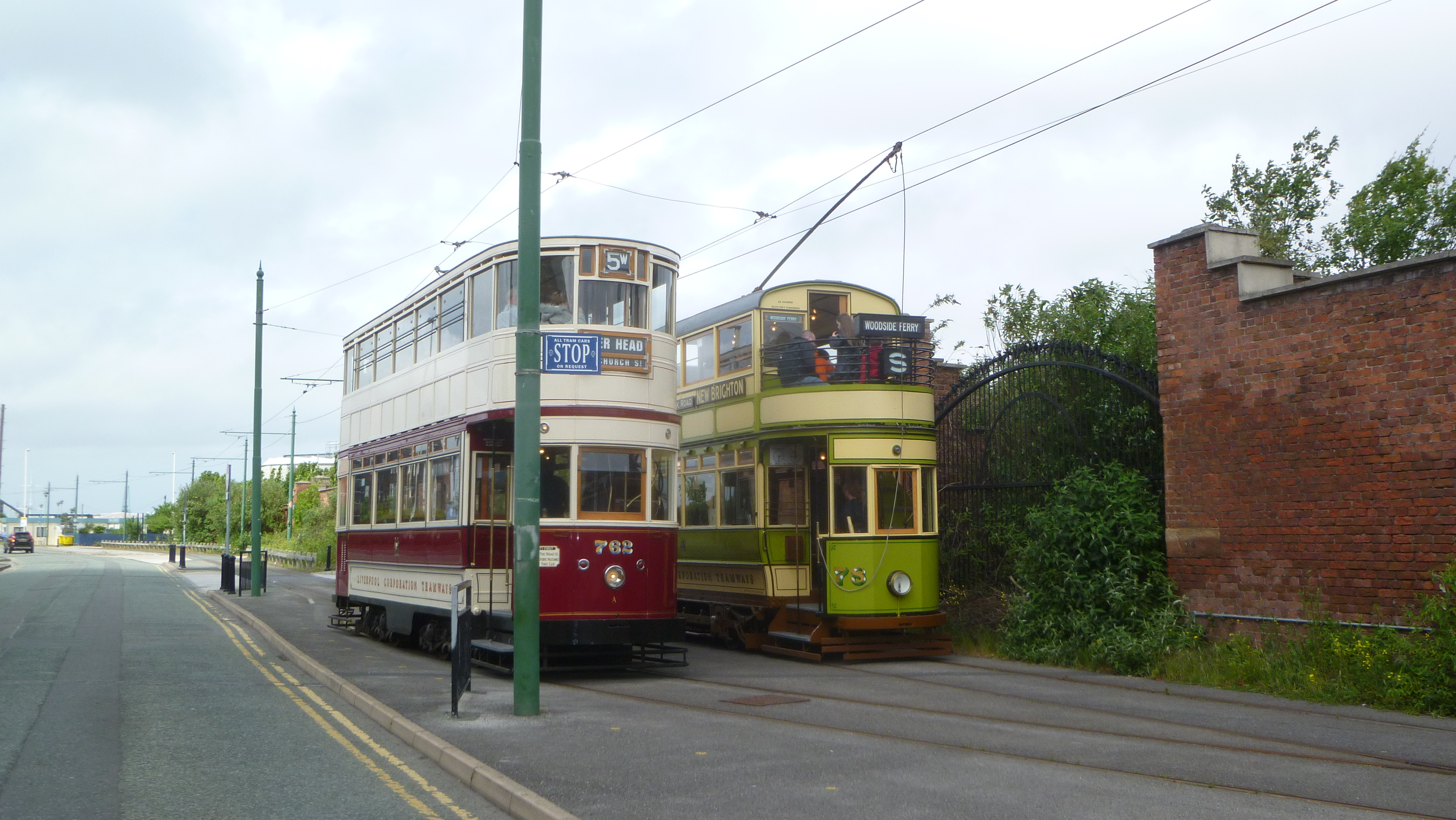
- Two trams pass each other at Pacific Road.

Operation
- Locale: Wirral
- Open: 14 April 1995
- Status: Temporarily closed
- Lines: One
- Routes: Wirral Transport Museum to Woodside Ferry Terminal
- Owner: Wirral Council
- Operator: Merseyside Tramway Preservation Society

Infrastructure
- Track gauge: Standard
- Stock: see vehicles

Statistics
- Route length: 0.7 miles (1.1 km)
- Stops: 6
- Average speed: 12 mph (19 km/h)

Wirral Tramway was a heritage tramway opened in 1995 by the Wirral Borough Council and Hamilton Quarter partnership and was operated by Blackpool Transport Services until 2005 when the council took over the licence to run the tramway.

The Wirral Transport Museum and tramway were set up with the assistance of The Hamilton Quarter and various volunteer groups including Merseyside Tramway Preservation Society, 201 Bus Group and the Merseyside Bus Club. In 2023, the Museum was transferred to Big Heritage CIC and has remained closed since, along with the tramway.

== History ==
Construction of the tramway was authorised by the Wirral Tramway Light Railway Order 1994 (SI 1994/1761), obtained by Wirral Borough Council. When the line opened on 14 April 1995, it consisted of a single track, running largely on its own reservation, from Woodside Ferry Terminal, along Shore Road, to a terminus near Pacific Road. The depot was just before the Pacific Road terminal and the length of the track was around 400 yards (370 m). The track was laid using rails reclaimed from the Liverpool Corporation Tramways system, and there were plans to extend the line to Egerton Dock as part of a project to redevelop parts of Birkenhead docks.

Two trams were specially built for the tramway in 1992 by Hong Kong Tramways Ltd. They are double deck fully enclosed vehicles, although they run on standard gauge tracks of 1,435 mm (4 ft 8 1/2 in) rather than the usual Hong Kong tram gauge of 3 ft 6 in (1,067 mm). The vehicles arrived in the United Kingdom in 1993, and acceptance trials were carried out on the Blackpool tramway, where the cars ran until the Wirral Tramway opened. Operation of the tramway was managed by Blackpool Transport Services.

The tramway was extended along the north side of the Twelve Quays campus of Wirral Metropolitan College to reach Egerton Wharf, where it turns away from the river. After crossing the A554, it runs between industrial units on a segregated formation, before finally crossing Taylor Street to enter the Wirral Transport Museum. There is a siding just before the Taylor Street crossing, and a passing loop at Pacific Road.

In 2010, Wirral Council reviewed their strategic assets, and decided to dispose of the Tramway, the museum at Taylor Street, and the depot at Pacific Road, part of which had been converted to an Arts Centre. Merseytravel initially expressed an interest, but the Passenger Transport Executive ruled that they would not support the takeover because of the cost. Wirral then looked for operators who would contract to operate the tramway, and removed the requirement that the Pacific Road venue should continue to be an Arts Centre. Merseytravel reconsidered, on the basis that the tramway could become part of a larger system, serving the Wirral Waters development, a regeneration of the docks to the north of the tramway. Discussions took place with Peel Holdings, who were managing the dock redevelopment, and were prepared to donate land for the tramway. They also suggested an extension to the International Trade Centre site, following the alignment of the former dock railway. The extension would be about 1,900 yards (1,700 m) long, and Merseytravel proposed to use three refurbished trams from the Blackpool system, which they already owned, to provide the main service.

At a meeting of Wirral Council in February 2014, it was noted that Merseytravel was no longer interested in buying the assets. Merseyside Tramway Preservation Society (MTPS) had by then produced a credible plan for taking over responsibility for the management of the museum and tramway, and Peel Holdings were still looking at a Wirral Street Car Project, to provide a tramway service to the Wirral Waters development. The council therefore decided to pursue the transfer of management to MTPS.

While this had been going on, the tramway had been forced to close in October 2011, after the council's electrical engineer retired, and although MTPS were initially told that they would not be able to resume operation in 2012, this decision was revoked, and the tramway resumed running in early January. The tramway closed again from October 2012 to February 2013, while new safety procedures were implemented. From January 2014, the MTPS has been responsible for the tramway, and it is now run entirely by volunteers.

== Wirral Street Car ==
Wirral Street Car is a proposed extension to the current line to turn it into a feeder service for the Merseyrail network to serve the proposed Wirral Waters development with the possibility of reusing track, rolling stock as well as pre-existing routes.

== Vehicles ==
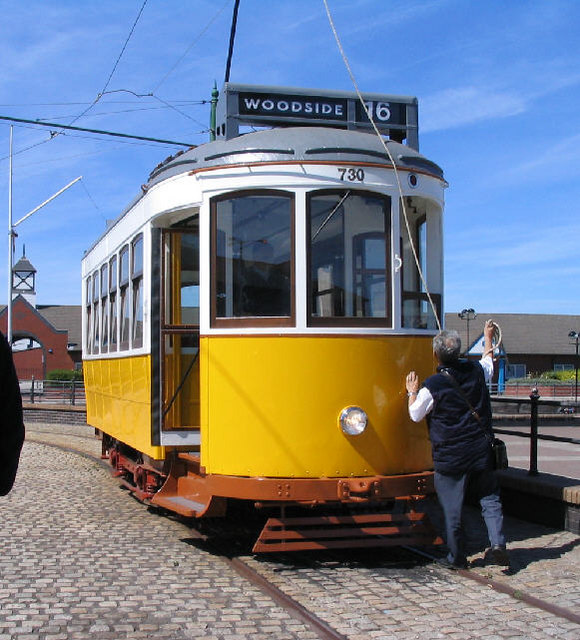
Lisbon No.730 at Woodside Ferry Terminal

The two four-wheeled Hong Kong trams are numbered 69 and 70 to follow on from the numbering of the original Birkenhead Corporation Tramways, the numbers of which went up to No.68. These are run from the Wirral Transport Museum in Taylor Street. In addition, trams from the Merseyside Tramway Preservation Society (MTPS) are also used at various times. These are:

- Liverpool Corporation Tramways 'English Electric' fully enclosed 8-wheel bogie car No.762. After withdrawal in 1956, the lower saloon was used as a clubhouse for the Newsham Park bowling green. The remains were rescued by the MTPS in 1977, and it was restored intermittently, arriving on the tramway on 6 February 2000. It entered public service in 2001.
- Birkenhead Corporation Tramways Open Top Milnes 4-wheel car No.20. This was one of the first batch of trams for Birkenhead, dating from 1900. A wooden upper saloon was fitted in the 1920s, and when the system was closed in 1937, it was reused as a potting shed near Chester. It was discovered by members of the MTPS in 1983, and restoration began, first at Cammell Laird's Princes Dock, and then at the depot on Pacific Road. A new Brill truck was acquired from Barcelona, and the trolley arm came from Blackpool. It re-entered service on 2 April 1999.
- Wallasey Corporation Tramways 'Bellamy' Brush 4-wheel car No.78. This tram was built in 1920, although it was old-fashioned in its design, having a covered central section of the upper deck, but open balconies at each end. On closure of the Wallasey system in 1933, it was used for storage on a farm in North Wales. The farmer gave it to the MTPS in 1986, and some initial restoration work was carried out in 1987. In 1997, the society obtained some Heritage Lottery Funding to allow them to complete the restoration, and the tram entered service in August 2002.
- Lisbon (Carris) Single Deck 4-wheel car No.730. Alan Pearce acquired this Lisbon tram, dating from 1930, for further use on the Seaton Tramway in Devon. However, it was stored at Walton-on-the-Naze for several years, and was donated to the MTPS in 2004. The Lisbon system uses a gauge of 900 mm (2 ft 11 7/16 in), and so it had to be regauged to run on the Wirral Tramway. Restoration work was completed by 2006, when the tram became the only single-deck vehicle operating on the tramway.
- Liverpool Corporation Tramways 'Baby Grand' 4-wheel car No.245. The tram belongs to the Liverpool Museums and is part of the National Collection. After much negotiation, the vehicle was moved to the Taylor Street museum in 2006, on the understanding that the MTPS would undertake restoration work, partly funded by a Heritage Lottery grant, and that it would run on the Wirral Tramway once the restoration was completed. The tram was stripped down to assess what work was necessary, and a grant of £50,000 was obtained in February 2010. Four years of work by staff and volunteers were completed in 2014, but there were delays, and the tram was not finally ready to begin revenue-earning work until September 2015.
- Warrington Corporation Tramways 4-wheel Milnes car No.28. This was originally car No.2, which was withdrawn in the 1930s, and was used as a shelter on a bowling green at Cuddington until 1977. It was rescued by Ray Henton and Alan Pritchard, and was at St Helens Transport Museum until 2004. MTPS were then able to procure various parts to aid its restoration, including a Brill long-wheelbase truck from Brussels. Following discussion within the society, a decision was taken to rebuild the top deck with covered but open balconies. Warrington No.8 ran in this form, although No.2 never did, and so the restored car will be numbered 28 when work is completed, to reflect its dual identity.

There are also two other trams at the museum:

- Birkenhead Horse car No.7 (in storage at present)
- Liverpool Horse tram No.43.
- Both require new wheelsets, and are not, at present, capable of running on the tramway.
- Douglas Bay Horse Tram 11
- Douglas Bay Horse Tram 47

Both require new wheelsets, and are not capable of running on the tramway due to them being the wrong gauge. The Douglas Bay Horse Tramway is a narrow gauge of 3 ft whereas the Wirral Tramway is British Standard gauge of 4 ft 8 1/2 inches.

The museum also displays numerous other old vehicles including cars, buses, motorbikes, cycles, a large model railway, as well as various other static displays and information about old vehicles. The museum is run entirely by voluntary staff, who can provide much information about the exhibits. The museum is one of the most comprehensive transport museums in the country and connects directly to Woodside with the Wirral Tramway.
