= Intermodal passenger transport =

Places for travelers to transfer from one category of vehicle to another

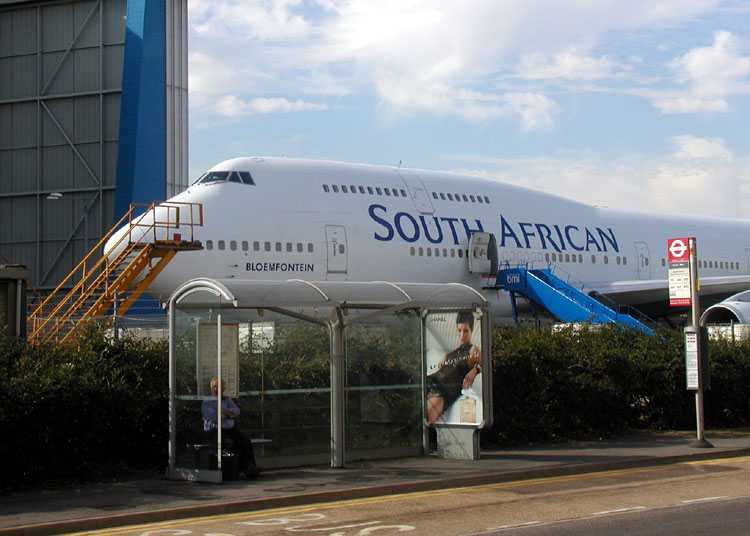
A bus stop inside London (Heathrow) Airport, England.

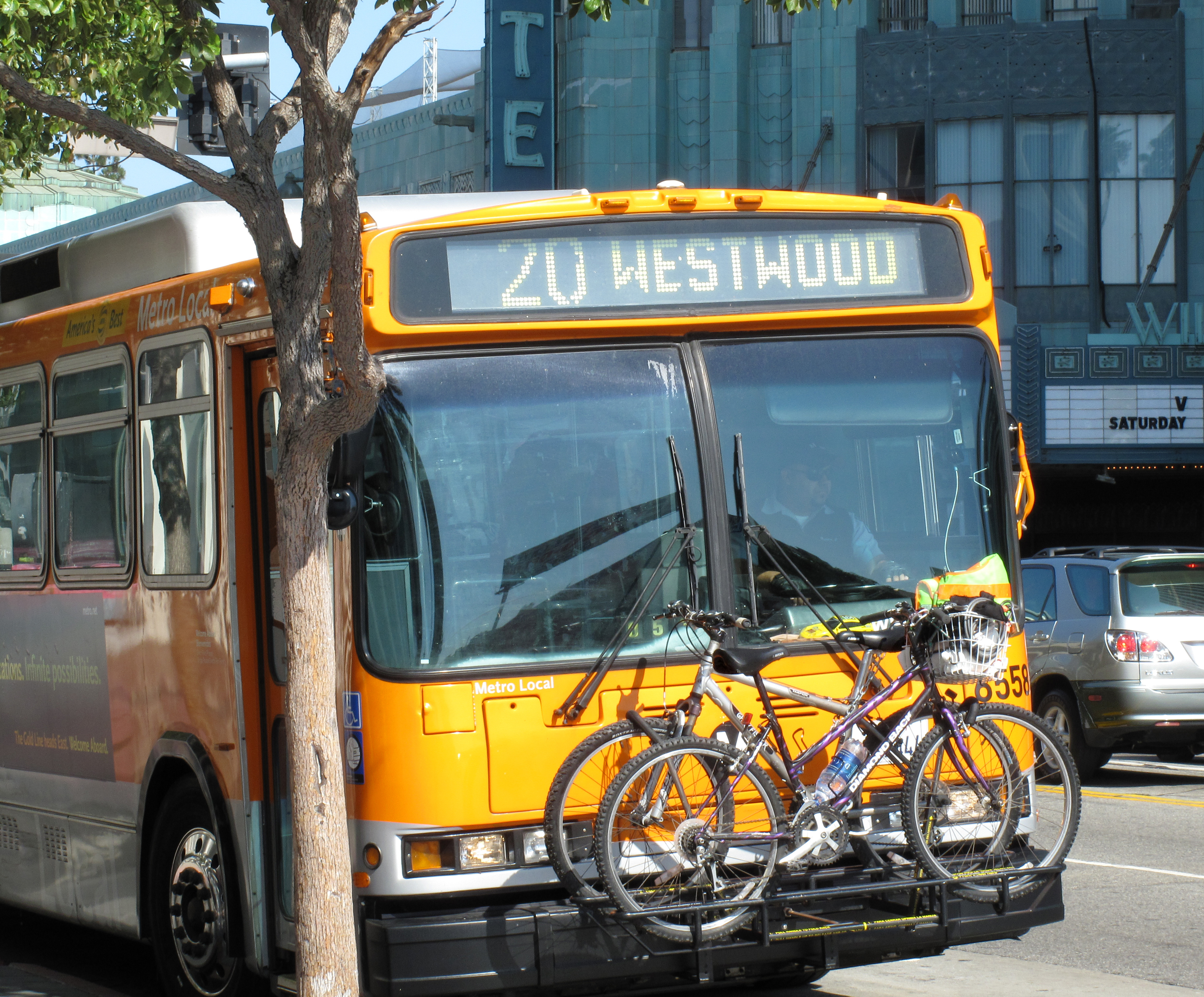
Bicycle rack on a bus of the Los Angeles Metro

Intermodal passenger transport, also called mixed-mode commuting, involves using two or more modes of transportation in a journey. Mixed-mode commuting is often used to combine the strengths (and offset the weaknesses) of various transportation options. A major goal of modern intermodal passenger transport is to reduce dependence on the automobile as the major mode of ground transportation and increase use of public transport. To assist the traveler, various intermodal journey planners such as Rome2rio and Google Transit have been devised to help travelers plan and schedule their journey.

Mixed-mode commuting often centers on a form of rapid transit, such as regional rail, which has high speed but limited coverage, to which low-speed options (i.e. bus, tram, or bicycle) are appended at the beginning or end of the journey. Trains offer quick transit from a suburb into an urban area, where passengers can choose a way to complete the trip. Most transportation modes have always been used intermodally; For example, people have used road or urban railway to an airport or inter-regional railway station.

== History ==
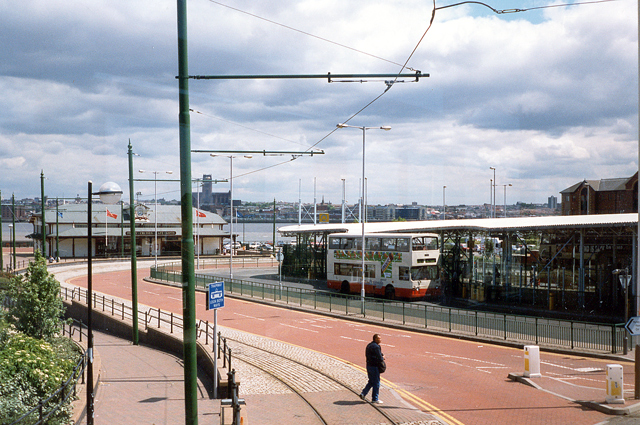
Woodside Ferry Terminal, Birkenhead Heritage Tramway and Woodside bus station

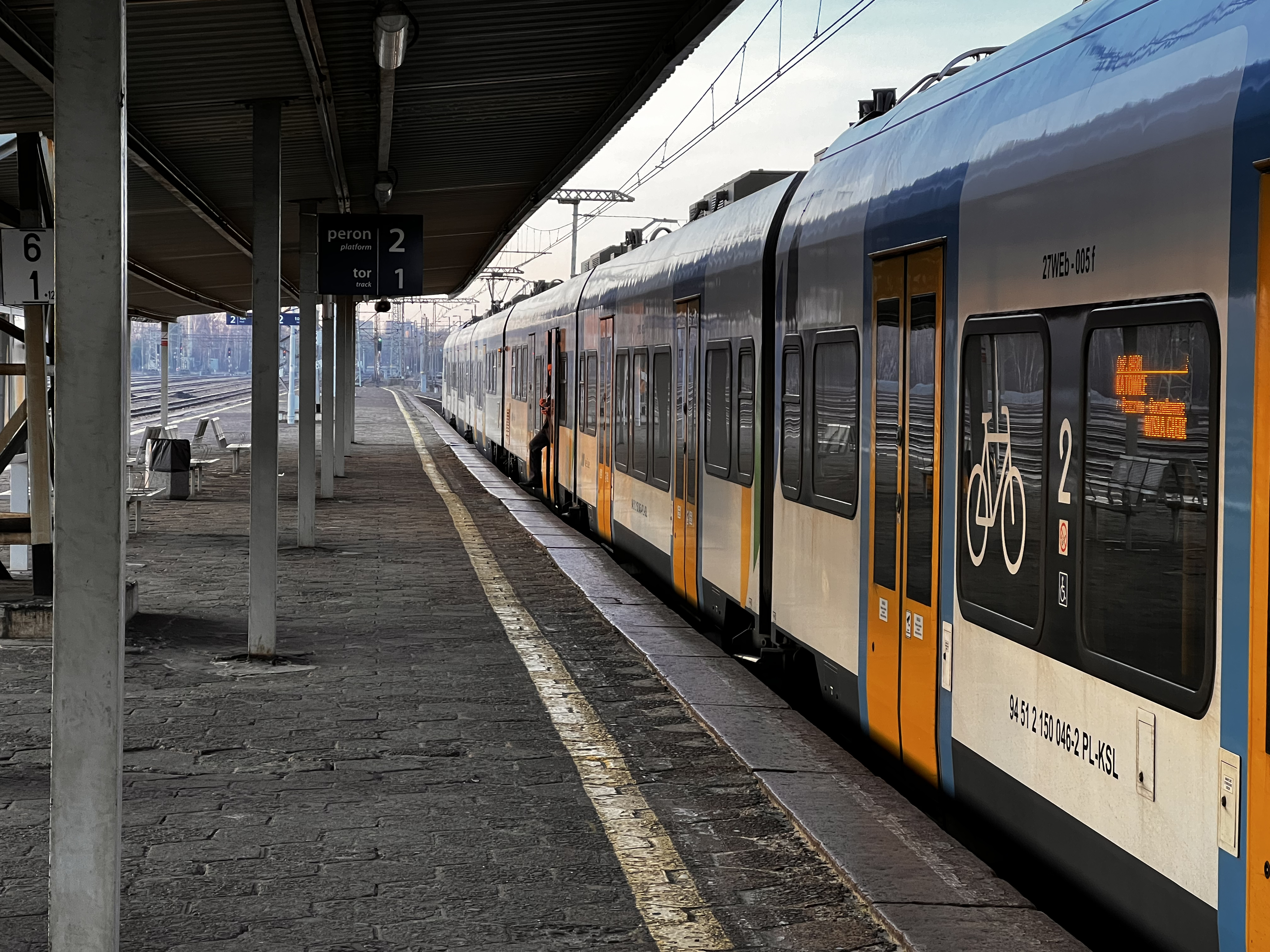
Train with marked place for bicycle transportation.

Intermodal transport has existed for about as long as passenger transport itself. People switched from carriages to ferries at the edge of a river too deep to ford. In the 19th century, people who lived inland switched from train to ship for overseas voyages. Hoboken Terminal in Hoboken, New Jersey, was built to let commuters to New York City from New Jersey switch to ferries to cross the Hudson River in order to get to Manhattan. A massive ferry slip, now in ruins, was incorporated into the terminal building. Later, when a subway was built through tunnels under the Hudson, now called the PATH, a station stop was added to Hoboken Terminal. More recently, the New Jersey Transit's Hudson-Bergen Light Rail system has included a stop there. Ferry service has recently been revived, but passengers must exit the terminal and walk across the pier to the more modest ferry slip.

With the opening of the Woodside and Birkenhead Dock Street Tramway in 1873, Birkenhead Dock railway station probably became the world's first tram for train interchange station.

== Urban and inter-urban mixed-mode commuting ==
Public transportation systems such as train or metro systems have the most efficient means and highest capacity to transport people around cities. Therefore, mixed-mode commuting in the urban environment is largely dedicated to first getting people onto the train network and once off the train network to their final destination.

=== Automobile to public transport nodes ===
Although automobiles are conventionally used as a single-mode form of transit, they also find use in a variety of mixed-mode scenarios. They can provide a short commute to train stations, airports, and piers, where all-day "park and ride" lots are often available. Used in this context, cars offer commuters the relative comfort of single-mode travel, while significantly reducing the financial and environmental costs.

Taxicabs and rental cars also play a major role in providing door-to-door service between airports or train stations and other points of travel throughout urban, suburban, and rural communities.

(Automobiles can also be used as the centerpiece of a multi-mode commute, with drivers resorting to walking or cycling to their final destination. Commuters to major cities take this route when driving is convenient, but parking options at the destination are not readily available.)

==== Park and ride ====
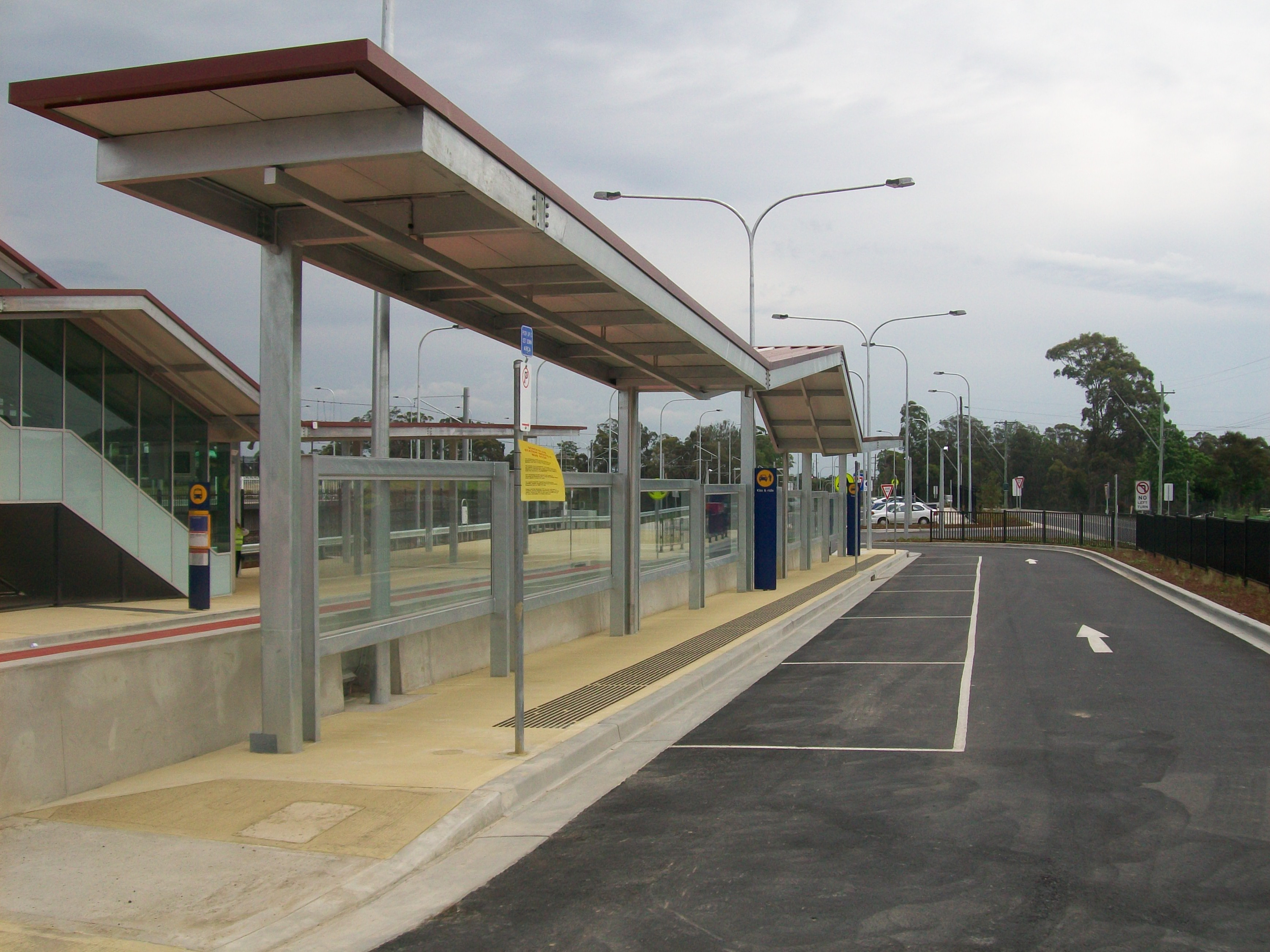
Park and ride at Schofields railway station, Australia

Transport planners often try to encourage automobile commuters to make much of their journey by public transport. One way of doing this is to provide car parking places at train or bus stations where commuters can drive to the station, park their cars and then continue on with their journey on the train or bus: this is often called "park and ride".

Similar to park and ride is what is often termed "kiss and ride". Rather than drive to the train or bus station and park the commuter is driven to the station by a friend or relative (parent, spouse etc.) The "kiss" refers to the peck on the cheek as the commuter exits the car. Kiss and ride is usually conducted when the train/bus/ferry station is close to home, so that the driver dropping the commuter off has a short journey to and from home.

=== Bus to public transport nodes ===
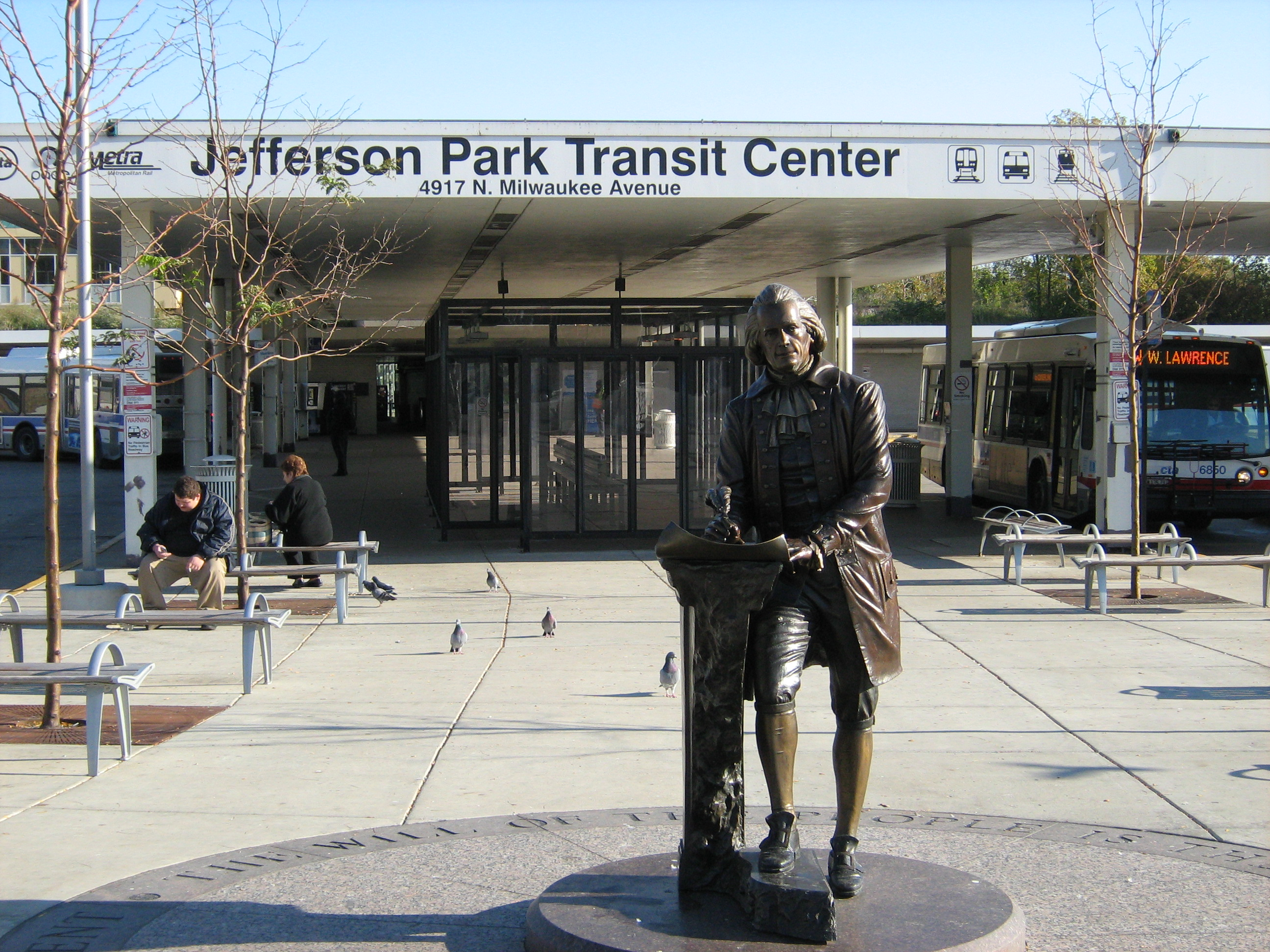
Chicago's Jefferson Park Transit Center is an intermodal hub for bus and train commuters.

Many large cities link their railway network to their bus network. This enables commuters to get to places that are not serviced directly by rail as they are often considered to be too far for walking.

Feeder buses are a specific example of this; feeder buses service local neighborhoods by taking travelers from their homes to nearby train stations which is important if the distances are too far to comfortably walk; at the end of the working day the buses take the travelers home again. Feeder buses work best when they are scheduled to arrive at the railway station shortly before the train arrives allowing enough time for commuters to comfortably walk to their train, and on the commuters' return journey buses are scheduled to arrive shortly after the train arrives so that the buses are waiting to take the commuters home. If train and bus services are very frequent then this scheduling is unimportant as the commuter will in any case have a very short wait to interchange.

=== Bike and ride ===
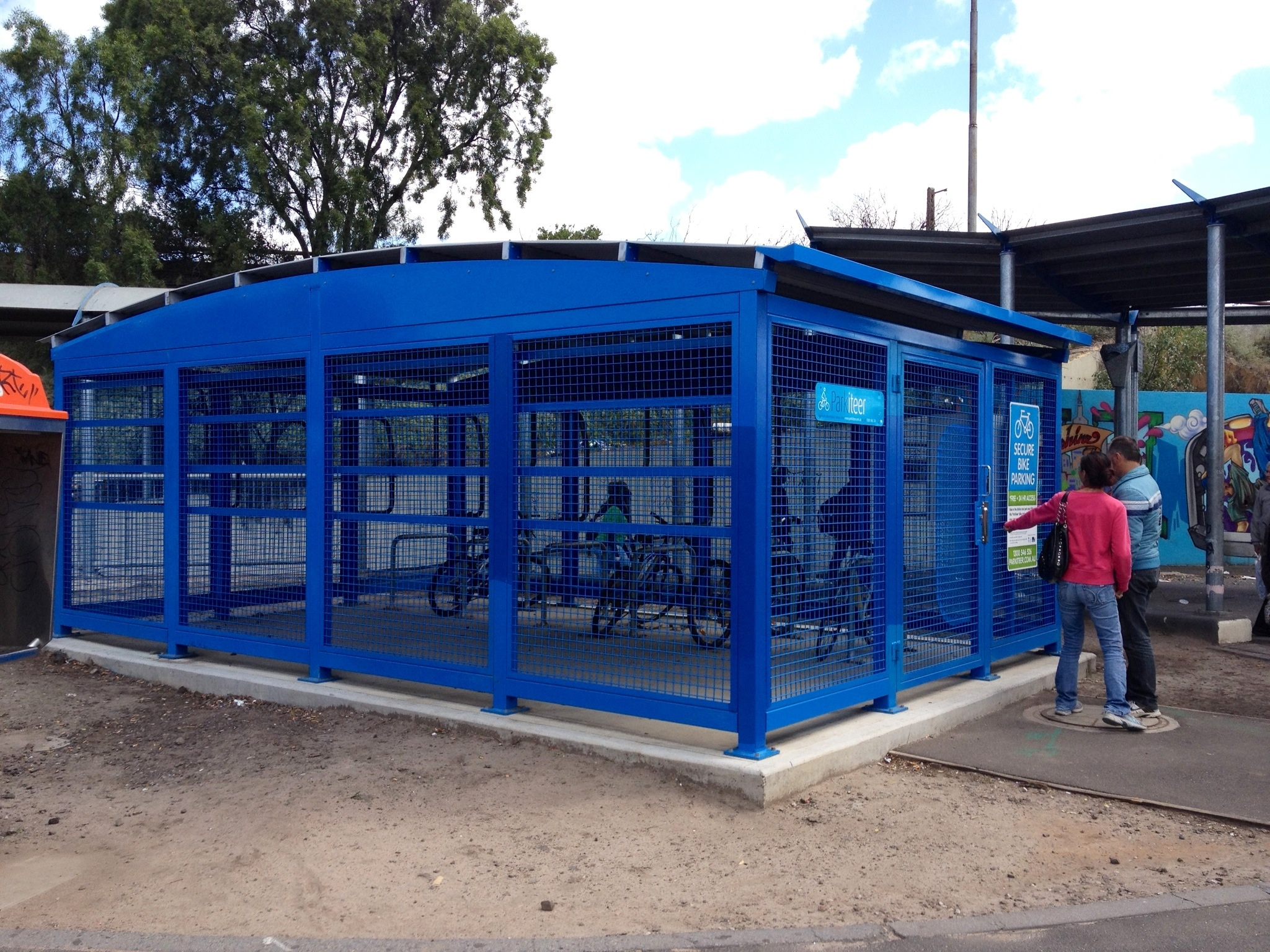
A Parkiteer bicycle parking station at Sunshine railway station, Melbourne in Australia

All around the world bicycles are used to get to and from train and other public transportation stations; this form of intermodal passenger transport is often called "bike and ride". To safeguard against theft or vandalism of parked bicycles at these train, bus, and ferry stations, "bike and ride" transport benefits greatly from secure bicycle parking facilities such as bicycle parking stations being available.

A comparative study by transport planner Karel Martens of bike-and-ride in the Netherlands, Germany and the United Kingdom found that most users cycled between 2 and 5 km (1 1/4 and 3 miles) to reach public transport. Access distances were longer for faster public-transport services, which also attracted more bike-and-ride users than slower services.

Some train, bus, and ferry systems allow commuters to take their bicycles aboard, allowing cyclists to ride at both ends of the commute, though sometimes this is restricted to off-peak travel periods: in such cases, folding bicycles may be permitted where regular bicycles are not. In some cities, bicycles are permitted aboard trains and buses.

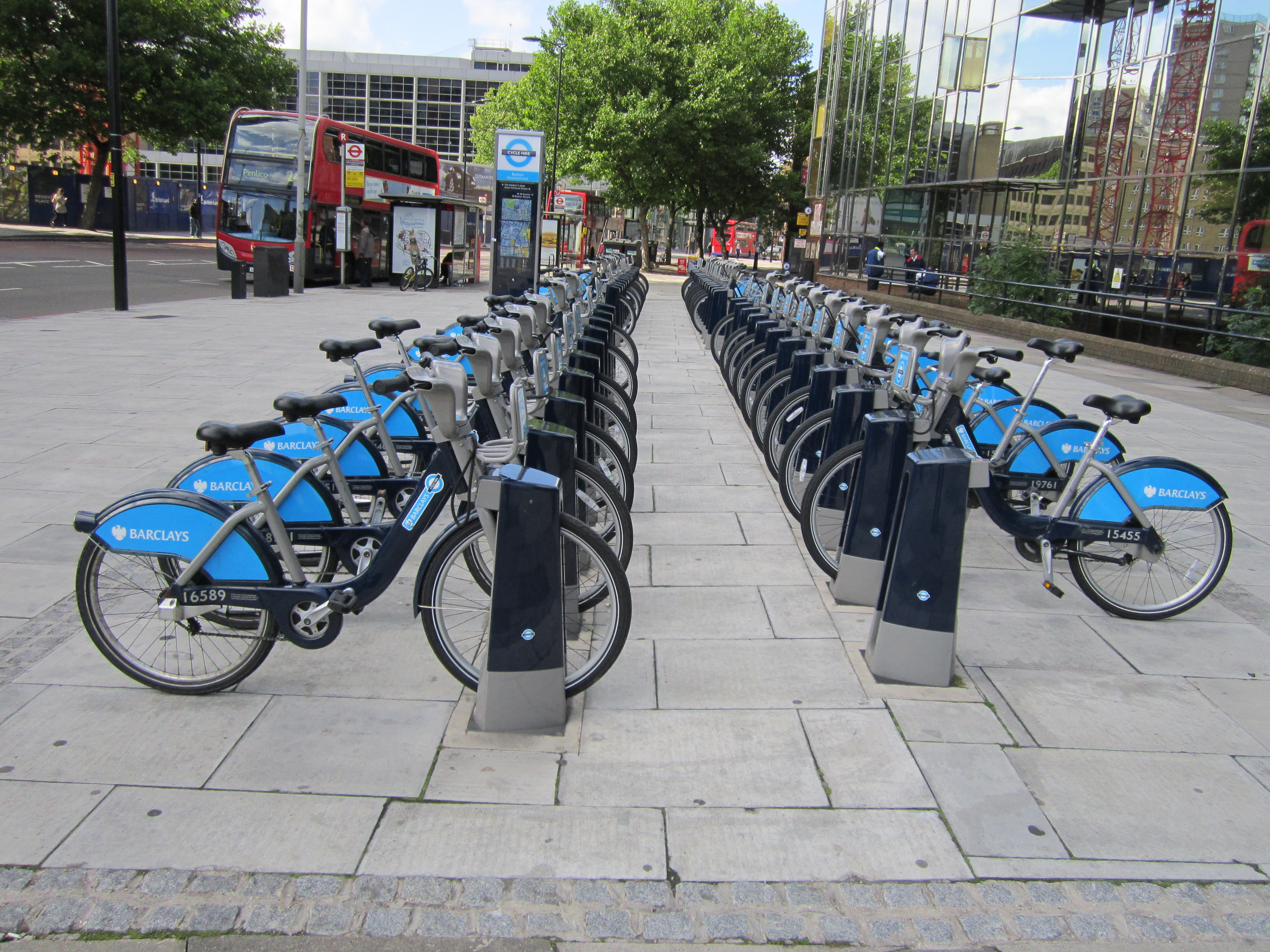
Public bicycles at Euston train and bus station

In some cities a community bicycle program allows commuters to take a public bike between the public transport station and a docking station near their origin or destination.

Many transit agencies have begun installing bike racks on the front of buses, as well as in the interior of buses, trains, and even on ferries. These transit bike racks allow cyclists the ability to ride their bicycle to the bus/train/ferry, take the mode of transportation, then ride again to their final destination. These types of racks combined with increased bike infrastructure and bike parking have made bike commuting a frequent topic of discussion by cities and local government.

== Inter-regional mixed mode commuting ==
=== Intermodal passenger transport involving air travel ===
==== Airport rail link ====
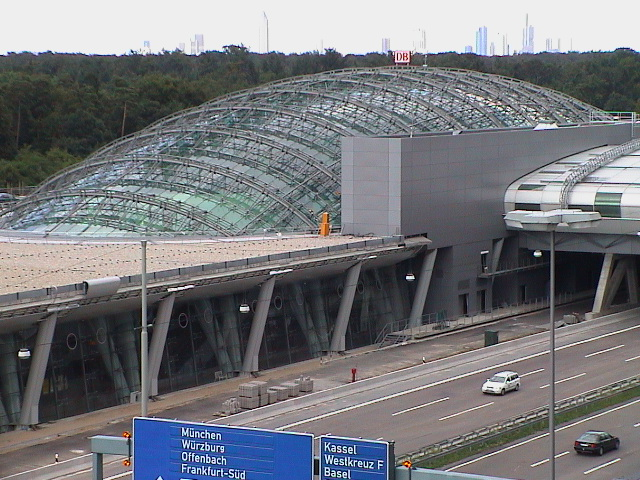
Frankfurt Airport long-distance station

Many cities have extended subway or rail service to major urban airports. This provides travelers with an inexpensive, frequent and reliable way to get to their flights as opposed to driving or being driven, and contending with full up parking, or taking taxis and getting caught in traffic jams on the way to the airport. Many airports now have some mass transit link, including London, Sydney, Munich, Hong Kong, Vancouver, Philadelphia, Cleveland, New York City (JFK), Delhi, and Chennai.

==== Airport–ferry connection ====
At the Hong Kong International Airport, ferry services to various piers in the Pearl River Delta are provided. Passengers from Guangdong can use these piers to take a flight at the airport, without passing through customs and immigration control, effectively like having a transit from one flight to another. The airport is well-connected with expressways and an Airport Express train service. A seaport and logistics facilities will be added in the near future. Kansai International Airport is also connected to Kobe Airport with ferries. The Toronto Island ferry connects Billy Bishop Toronto City Airport to mainland Toronto, where passengers can connect to the Toronto streetcar system or with airport shuttle buses which transports to bus, subway and rail connections at Union Station.

==== Airport bus link ====
Most airports have a number of dedicated airport buses which connect the airport and the city, which usually offers a higher level of comfort and luggage facilities compared to normal city buses.

More recently, airlines have started running buses between airports and cities which the airport do not directly serve, as a means to replace short-haul flights, for example, Finnair has now stopped flying between Helsinki and Turku / Tampere and runs buses from Helsinki airport direct to the city center of the respective cities.

=== Automobiles on trains ===
Several passenger rail systems offer services that allow travelers to bring their automobiles with them. These usually consist of automobile carrying wagons attached to normal passenger trains, but some special trains operate solely to transport automobiles. This is particularly of use in areas where trains may travel but automobiles cannot, such as the Channel Tunnel.

=== Trains on boats ===
A train ferry is a ship designed to carry railway vehicles. While usually used to carry freight vehicles, passenger cars can also be carried. In other places passengers move between passenger cars to a passenger ferry.

=== Train–ferry connection ===
Prior to the widespread use of automobiles, the San Francisco Bay Area featured a complex network of ferry services which connected numerous interurban and streetcar systems in the North and East Bay to the San Francisco Ferry Building, where several city streetcar lines began service. The opening of the rail-carrying San Francisco–Oakland Bay Bridge and automotive Golden Gate Bridge almost entirely supplanted these services.

Sonoma–Marin Area Rail Transit commuter rail is expected to feature a connection with the Golden Gate Ferry and service to San Francisco Ferry Building at Larkspur Landing. The Hercules station is to be the first direct Amtrak-to-ferry transit hub in the San Francisco Bay.

The Staten Island Railway, while operated by the Metropolitan Transportation Authority, does not have a physical connection to the rest of New York City's rail network. As such, transfers to Manhattan are facilitated by the free Staten Island Ferry.

== Transfer facilities ==
In recent years, an increasing emphasis has been placed on designing facilities that make such transfers easier and more seamless. These are intended to help passengers move from one mode (or form) of transportation to another. An intermodal station may service air, rail, and highway transportation for example.

In some cases, facilities were merged or transferred into a new facility, as at the William F. Walsh Regional Transportation Center in Syracuse, New York, or South Station in Boston, Massachusetts. In other cases new facilities, such as the Alewife Station In Cambridge, Massachusetts, were built from the start to emphasize intermodalism.

Regional transit systems in the United States often include regional intermodal transit centers that incorporate multiple types of rail and bus services alongside park and ride amenities. Until the completion of San Francisco Salesforce Transit Center, the Millbrae Intermodal Terminal in California is the largest intermodal transit center west of the Mississippi which includes direct on-platform connections between BART, the Bay Area's regional rail system, Caltrain, the San Francisco Peninsula's commuter rail, and SamTrans, the regional bus service for San Mateo County. The uniqueness of this transfer facility is that turnstiles are located on the platforms between rail services in addition to on a separate concourse to allow for direct transfers. Millbrae Intermodal Terminal is also planned to be incorporated into the California High-Speed Rail project as one of two stations between San Francisco and San Jose.

== Assessment ==
=== Advantages ===
Mixed mode commuting combines the benefits of walking, bicycle commuting, or driving with the benefits of rapid transit while offsetting some of the major disadvantages of each. The use of a bicycle can, for example, make an (inexpensive compared to a car) 30-kilometer-long (20-mile) light-rail or suburban rail journey attractive even if the endpoints of the journey each sit 1.5 km (1 mile) out from the stations: the 30 minutes walking time becomes 8 minutes bicycling.

As in the example above, location plays a large role in mixed mode commuting. Rapid transit such as express bus or light rail may cover most of the distance, but sit too far out from commute endpoints. At 5 km/h (3 mph) walking, 3 km (2 miles) represents about 40 minutes of commute time; whereas a bicycle may pace 20 km/h (12 mph) leisurely, cutting this time to 10 minutes. When the commuter finds the distance between the originating endpoint (e.g. the home) and the destination (e.g. the place of employment) too far to be enjoyable or practical, commute by car or motorcycle to the station may remain practical, as long as the commute from the far end station to the destination is practical by walking, a carry-on cycle, or another rapid transit such as a local or shuttle bus.

In general, locations close to major transit such as rail stations carry higher land value and thus higher costs to rent or purchase. A commuter may select a location further out than practical walking distance but not more than practical cycling distance to reduce housing costs. Similarly, a commuter can close an even further distance quickly with an ebike, motorcycle, or car, allowing for the selection of a more preferred living area somewhat further from the station than would be viable by walking or simple bicycle.

Other cost advantages of mixed mode commuting include lower vehicle insurance via Pay As You Drive programs; lower fuel and maintenance costs; and increased automobile life. In the most extreme cases, a mixed-mode commuter may opt to car share and pay only a small portion of purchase, fuel, maintenance, and insurance, or to live car-free. These cost benefits are offset by costs of transit, which can vary. A Maryland MTA month pass valid for MTA Light Rail, Metro Subway, and City Bus costs $64, while a month pass for the Baltimore to DC MARC costs $175.00 and a DC MetroRail 7 day pass costs $47 totaling $182. In most of Europe Verkehrsverbund and mode neutral pricing eliminate the need to have several different tickets for public transit across different modes. Mobility as a service intends to take this a step further, offering one price per trip from door to door, no matter which mode is used for which part of the trip.

=== Disadvantages ===
The effectiveness of a mixed-mode commute can be measured in many ways: speed to destination, convenience, security, environmental impact, and proximity to mass transit are all factors. Because mixed-mode commutes rely on a certain degree of coordination, scheduling issues with mass transit can often be an issue. For example, a sometimes-late train can be an annoyance, and an often-late train can make a commute impractical.

Weather can also be a factor. Even when the use of an automobile is involved, the transition from one mode of transportation to another often exposes commuters to the elements. As a result, multi-mode commuters often travel prepared for inclement weather.

In the United States fare integration is often lacking, making passengers "pay extra for the 'privilege' of having a connection". This is largely a non-issue in European cities where all modes of local public transit follow the same ticketing scheme and a ticket for e.g. the metro will be valid on buses or commuter rail.

== See also ==
- Commuting
- Cyclability
- Park and ride
- Intermodal Journey Planner
- The notion of co-modality introduced by the European Commission
- Flying car
- Multimodal transport
- Transit pass
- Intermodal freight transport
