= Bicycle parking =

Parking for bicycles

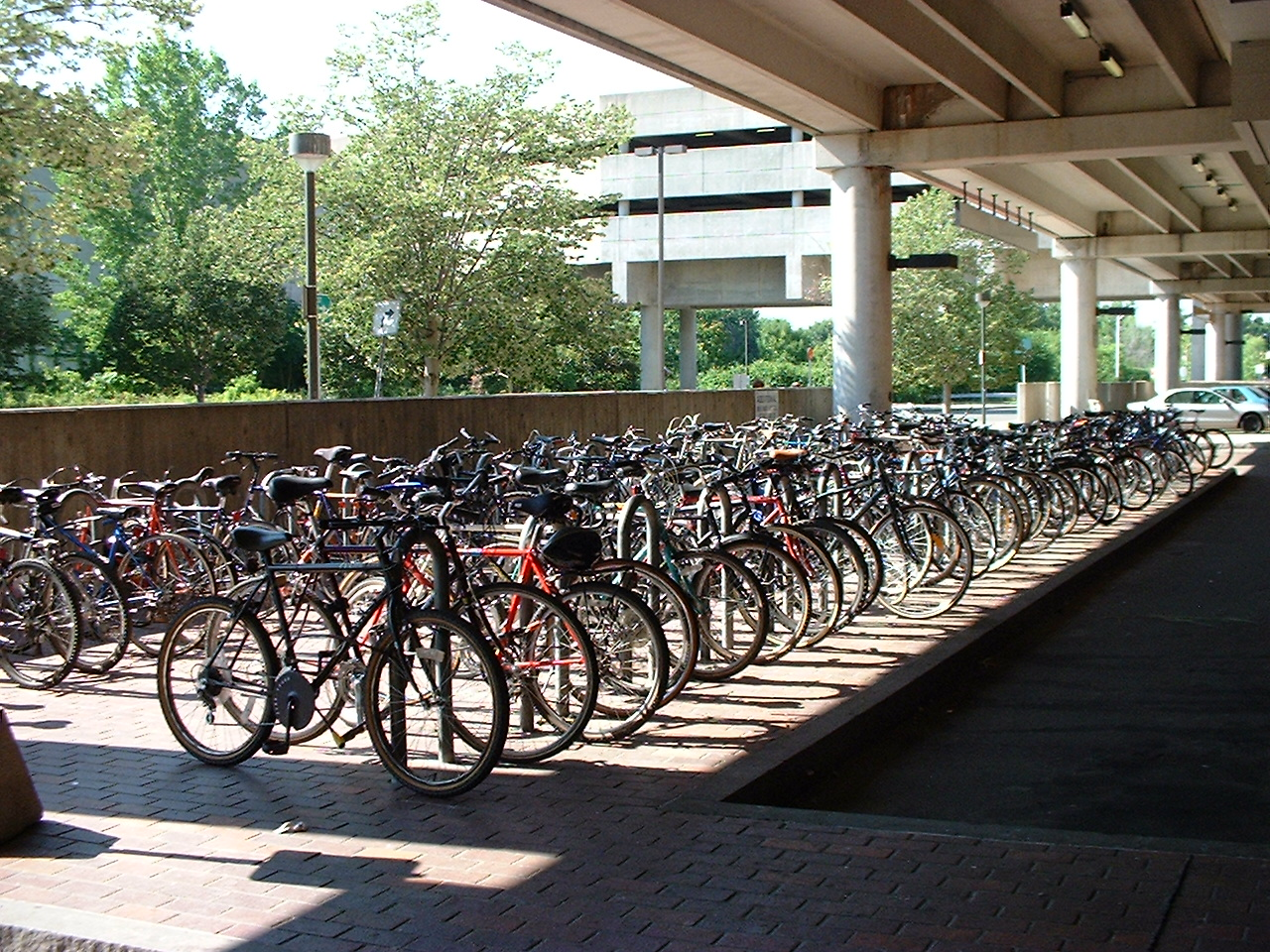
A bicycle parking station in Massachusetts

Bicycle parking is part of the cycling infrastructure of a populated place allowing for the storage of bicycles when they are not being used. Parking facilities for bicycles include racks, lockers, sheds and parking stations (i.e. dedicated roofed/undercroft parking lots). Bicycle parking infrastructure, in addition to cyclists' own equipment such bicycle locks, offers a degree of security and may prevent bicycle theft, as well as varying weather and sunlight protection depending on how sheltered is the parking. Ad hoc or improvized bicycle parking alongside railings, signposts, fences and other street furniture is also a common practice and may be recognized through formal legal arrangements.

Bicycle parking is an important consideration for the cyclability of a locality. Secure bicycle parking is a factor that influences people's decision to cycle. Bicycle parking at mass transit stations facilitates mixed-mode commuting. The role of bicycle parking in urban planning is studied through the discipline of bicycle transportation planning and engineering. Provisions for bicycle parking may be included in municipal policies and regulations.

== Overview ==
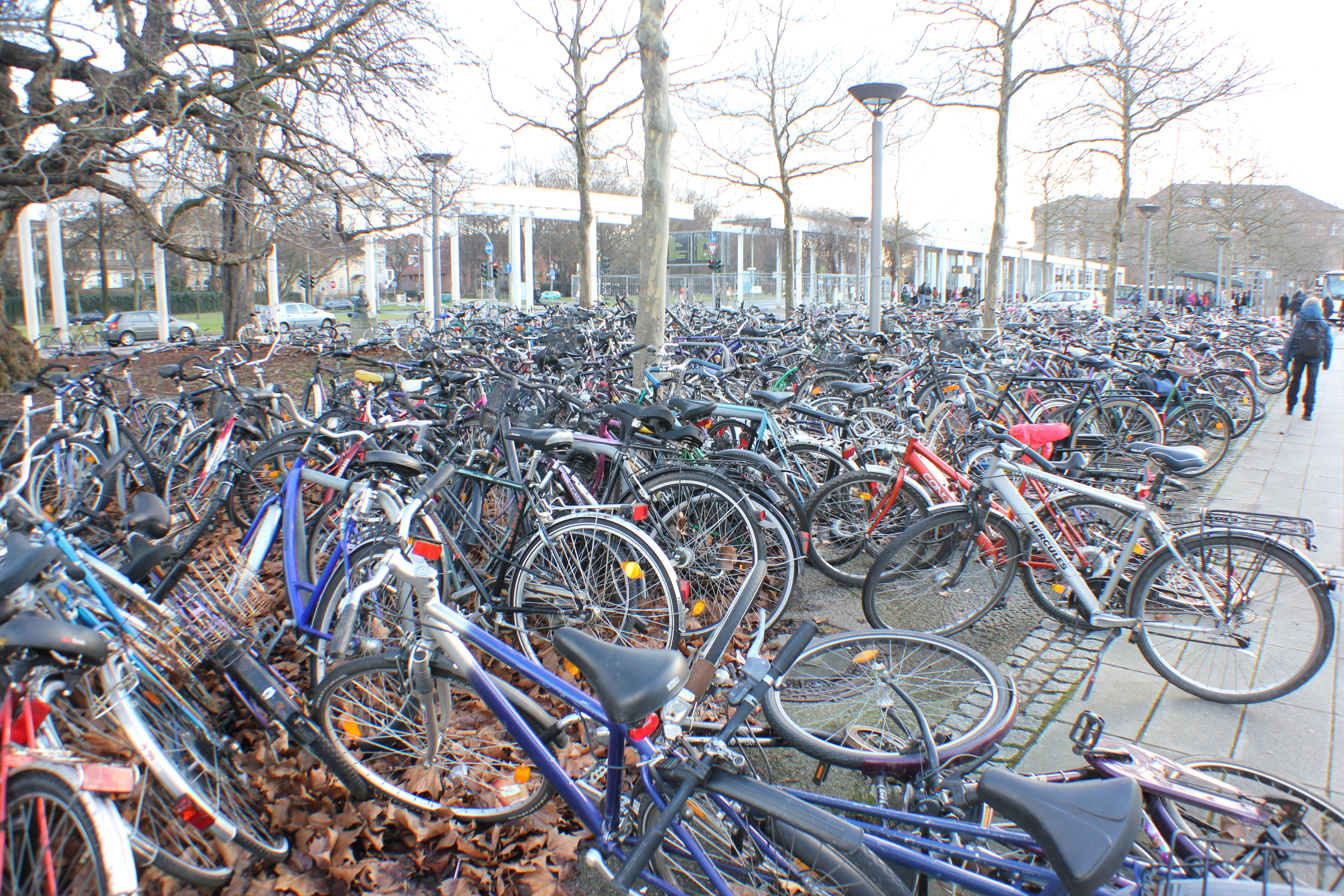
Without organized parking facilities, bike parking can easily become a problem in densely populated areas.

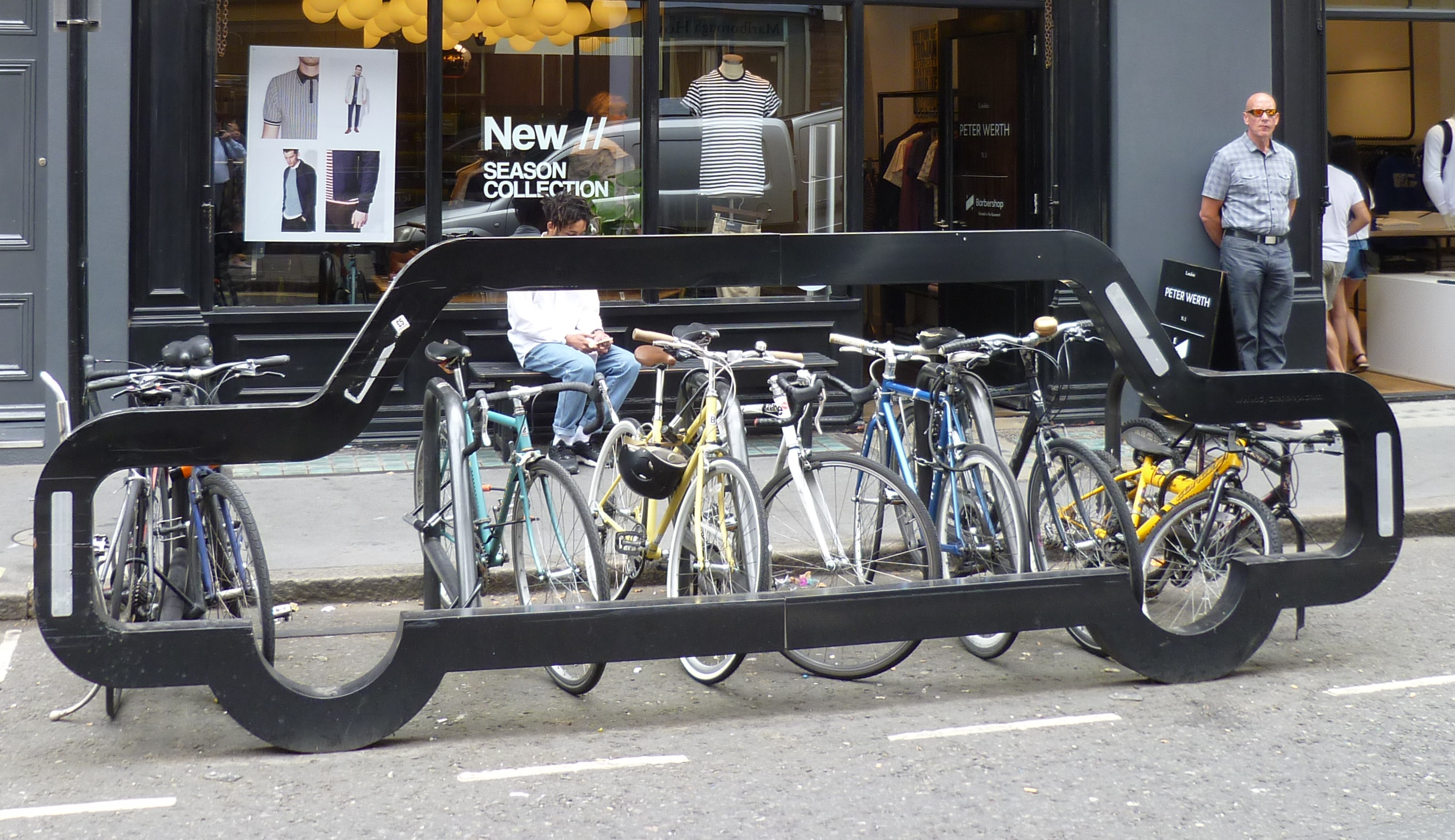
The space needed to park a single automobile can accommodate nearly a dozen bicycles.

Bicycle parking is an important part of a municipality's cycling infrastructure and as such is studied in the discipline of bicycle transportation engineering. When bicycle parking facilities are scarce or inadequate, nearby trees or parking meters are often used instead.

Sections of existing car parks can often be retrofitted as cycle parking, offering advantages of location, cover, security, and parking for more people.

In addition to car parking, town planning policies and regulations increasingly require provisions for bicycle parking in new developments. Many mass transit stations include bicycle parking in the form of bike racks or purpose-built bicycle parking stations to facilitate mixed-mode commuting.

Secure bicycle parking is arguably a key factor that influences the decision to cycle. To be considered secure, parking facilities must be of a suitable design; allowing the bicycle to be locked via the frame (see bicycle parking rack). A readily observable location can also permit so-called passive security from passers-by. Weather protection is also desirable. As a rule, where cycling is encouraged as an alternative to motoring, efforts should be made to make bicycle parking more convenient and attractive to use than nearby car parking arrangements. This usually means providing a wide distribution of visible, clearly designated parking spots, close to the entrances of destinations being served.

Storage rooms or bicycle lockers may also be provided. In some cases, large concentrations of bike parking may be more appropriate, sometimes being supervised and sometimes fee-based. Examples include bicycle parking stations at public transport interchanges such as railway, subway, tram, bus stations or ferry ports where they may be useful in mixed-mode commuting.

Conversely, where cycling is seen as an unwelcome or inappropriate activity, or there is a lack of knowledge about best practices, bicycle parking may simply not be provided or else placed at awkward, distant, and out-of-sight locations. Cyclists may be expressly forbidden from parking their bicycles at the most convenient locations. In April 2007, the authorities at the University of California's Santa Barbara campus started confiscating bicycles parked at other than official bike racks. Some property owners or municipal authorities display signage on fencing to discourage bicyclists from locking their bicycles.

== Bicycle parking in transport interchanges ==
According to a study by Dutch transport planner, Karel Martens, increased bicycle parking facilities in bus stops, stations and transport hubs increases the accessibility of such transportation solutions to cyclists as well as easing the last / first mile problem encountered by those who wish to access public transportation but encounter difficulties in their journeys from their point of origin to public transport or from their transportation to their destination. The availability of bicycle parking at public-transport stops varies by country and mode. In the Netherlands, guarded parking was traditionally provided at railway stations, although underinvestment created problems of capacity, quality and accessibility before an upgrading programme began in the early 1990s. Dutch station-planning guidance administered a mixture of secured and unsecured parking, visible placement of ordinary parking, and sufficient spare capacity to accommodate peak demand. The appropriate type of parking can vary between user groups according to Martens. In several Dutch bus-stop trials, bicycle lockers attracted little use where their price was high relative to the value of passengers’ bicycles or where passengers thought there was low risk of theft.

== Types and equipment ==
- Bicycle parking rack - also known as bicycle stand
- Bicycle parking station
- Bicycle lock
- Bicycle locker
- Cyclability
- Sucker pole (not recommended for bicycle parking due to high incidents of theft)

== Gallery ==
Urban planning

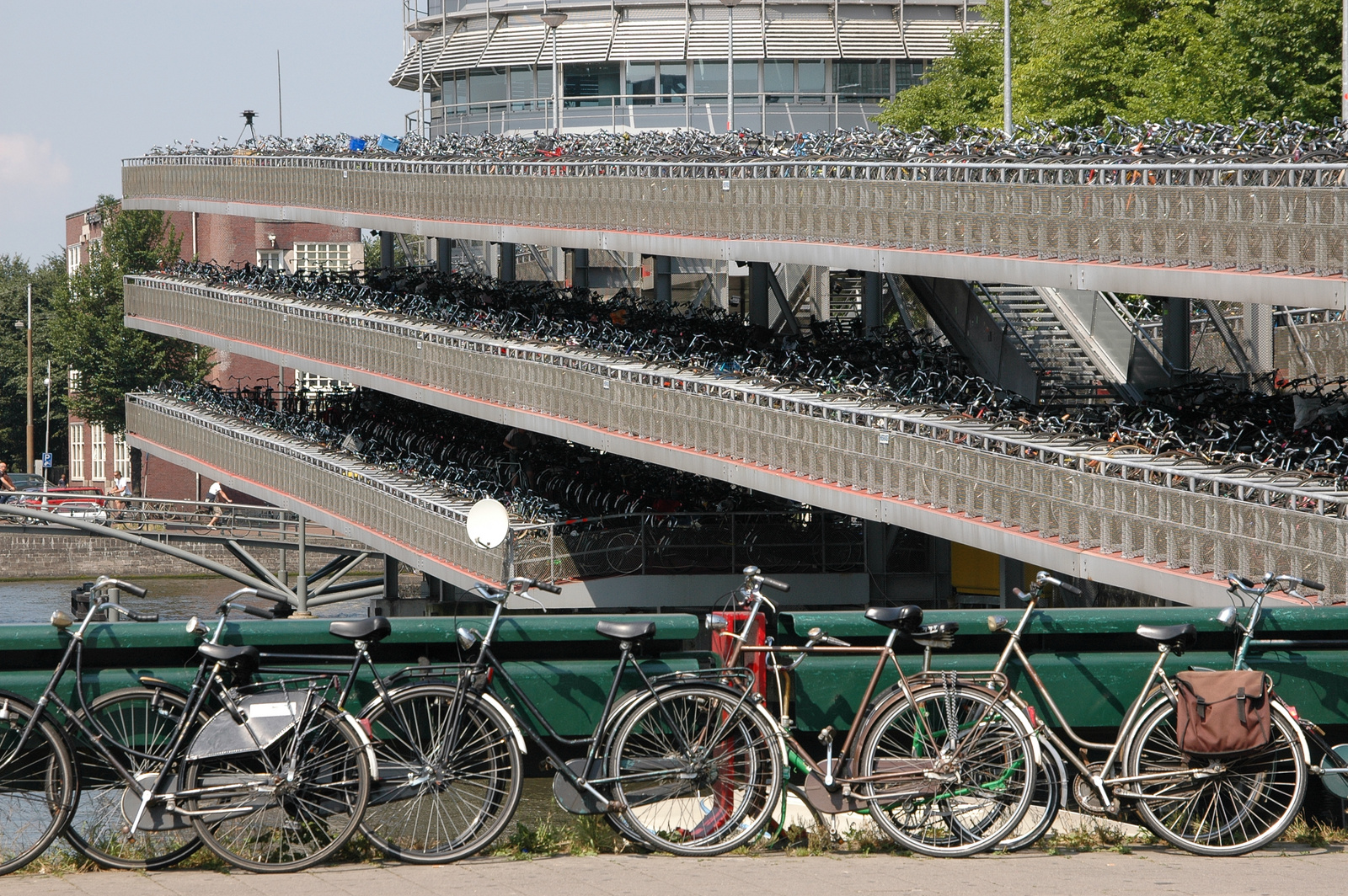
Multi-storey parking facility

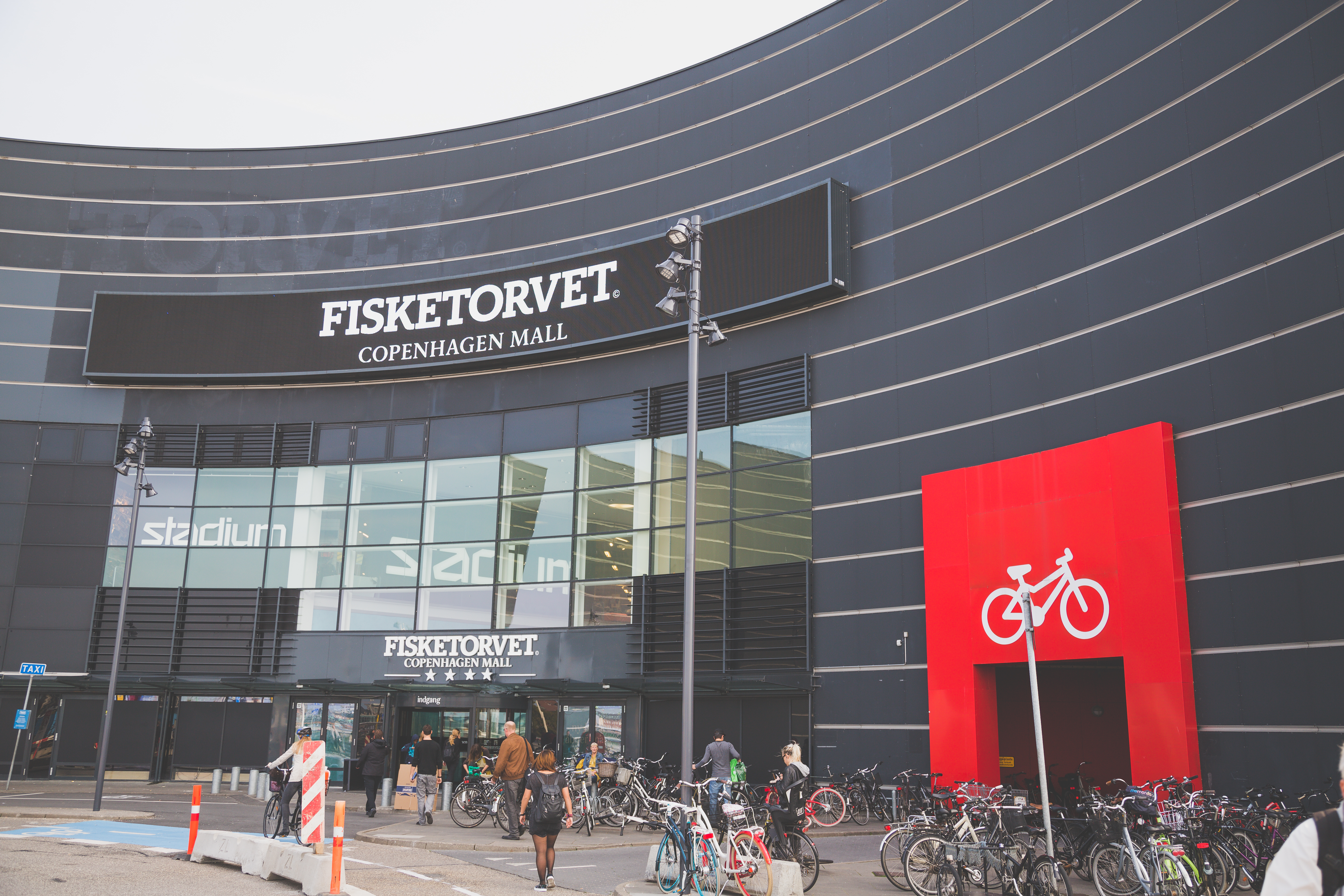
Bike parking house at the shopping mall

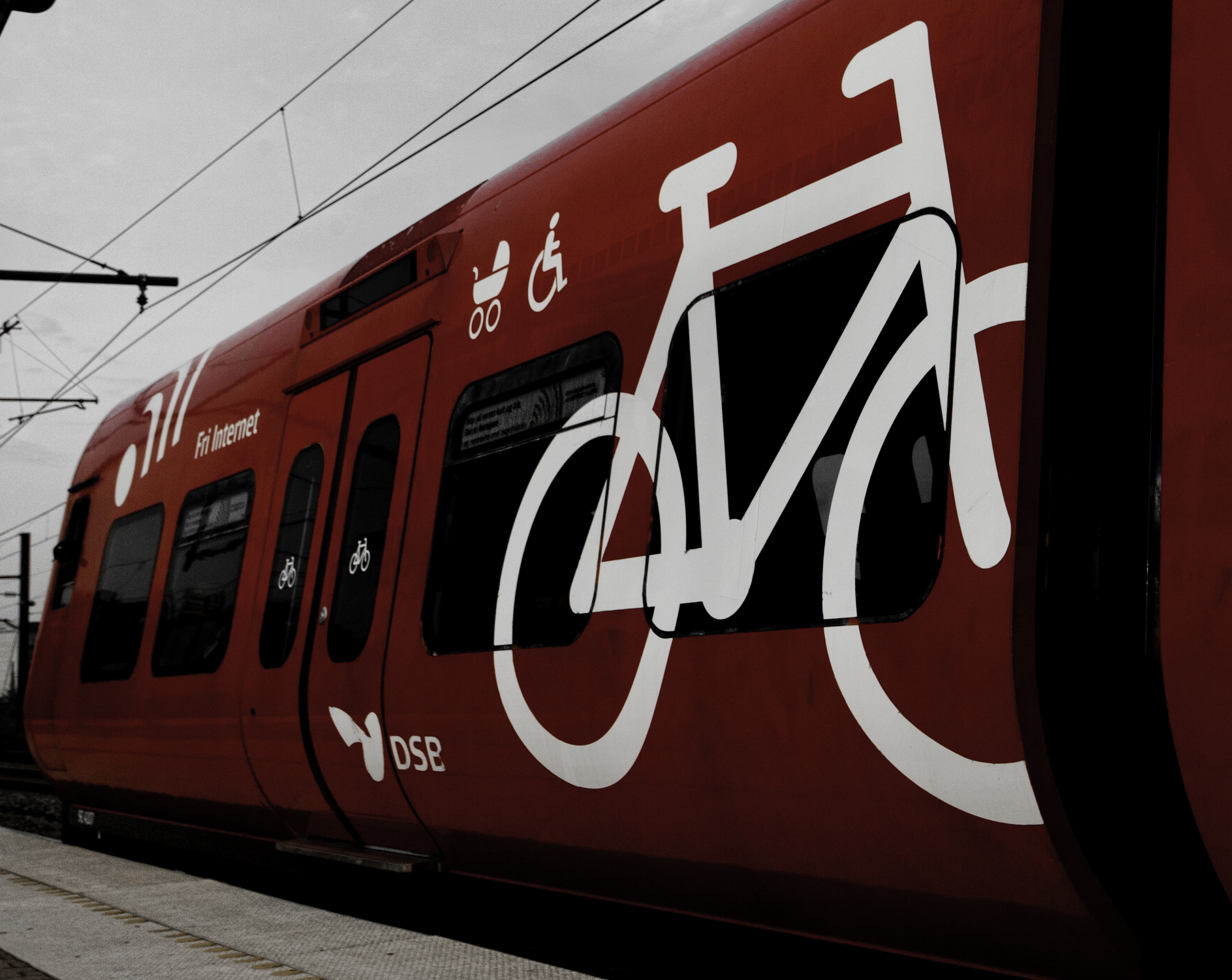
Integrating bicycles with other modes of transportation

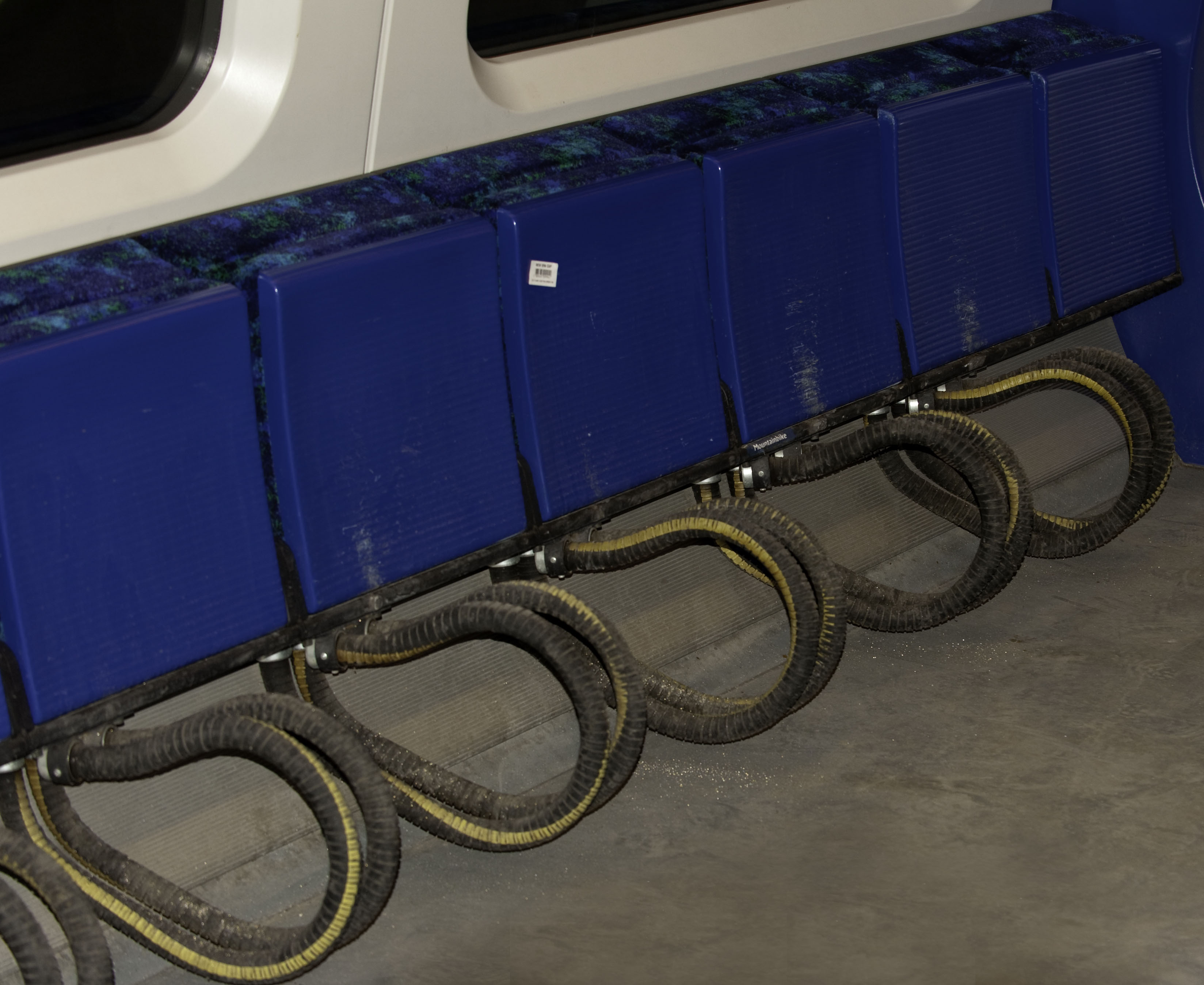
Bike racks on trains

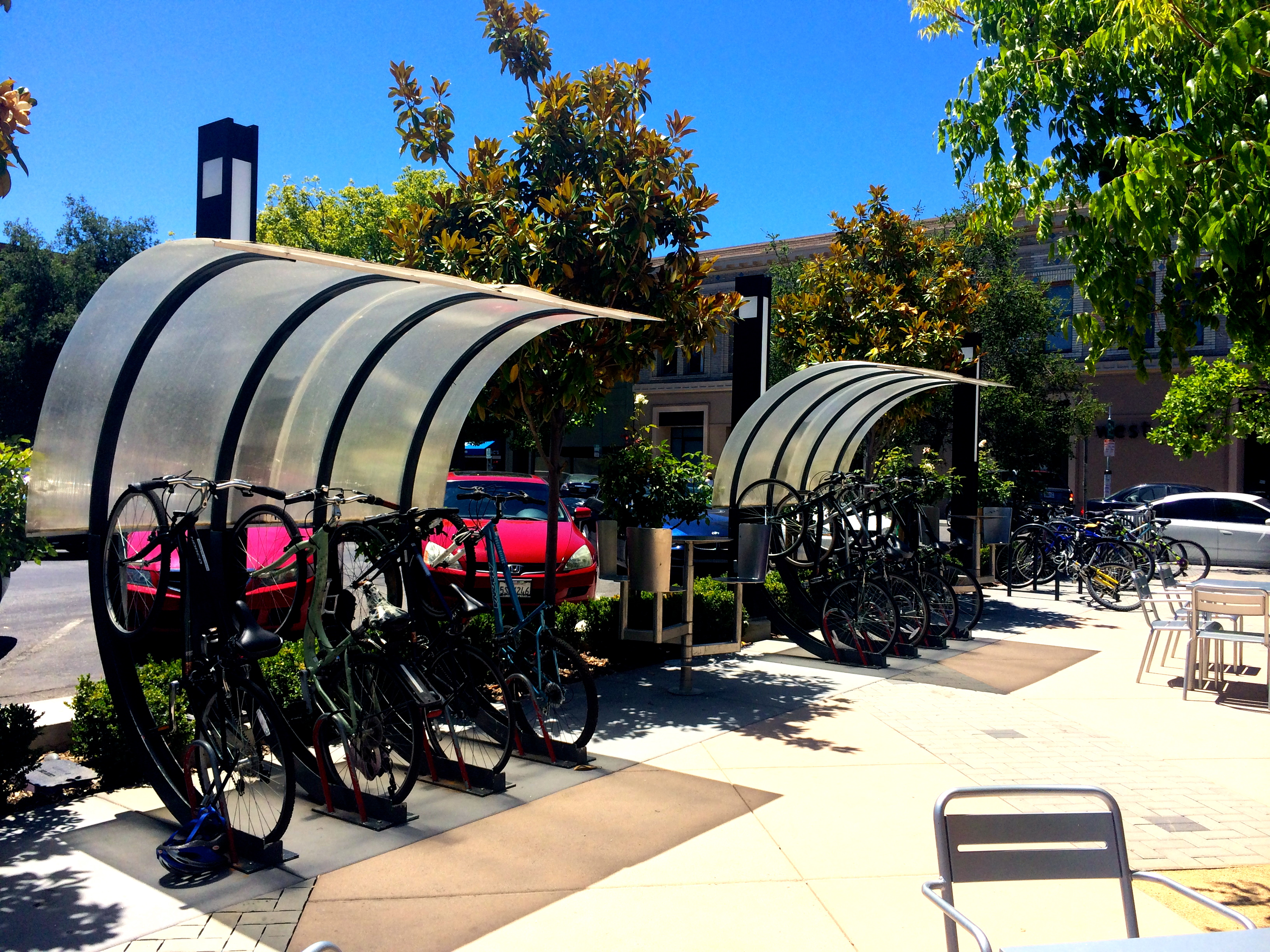
Bike parking shelters

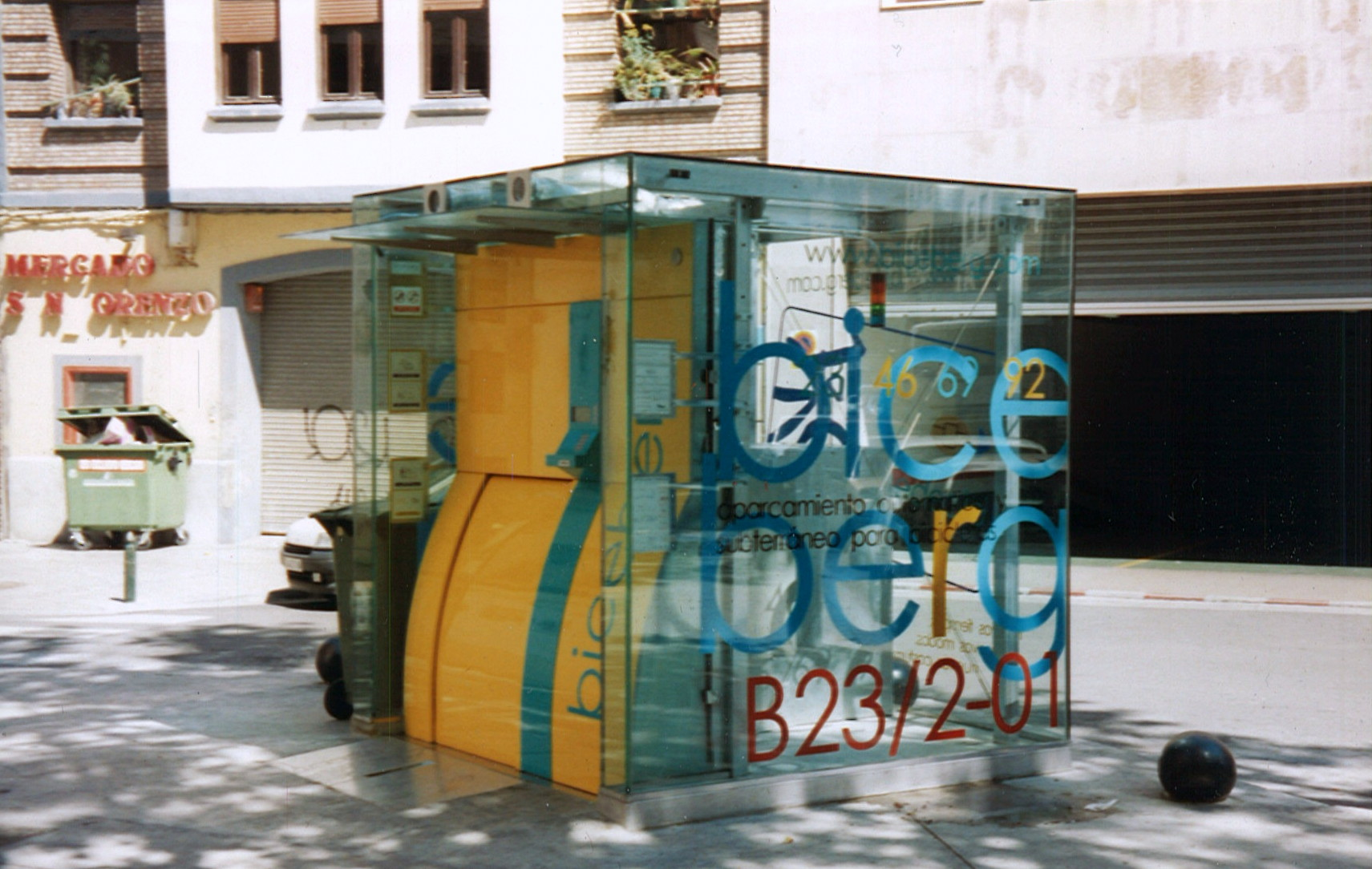
Automated underground bicycle storage system (Biceberg in Zaragoza, Spain)

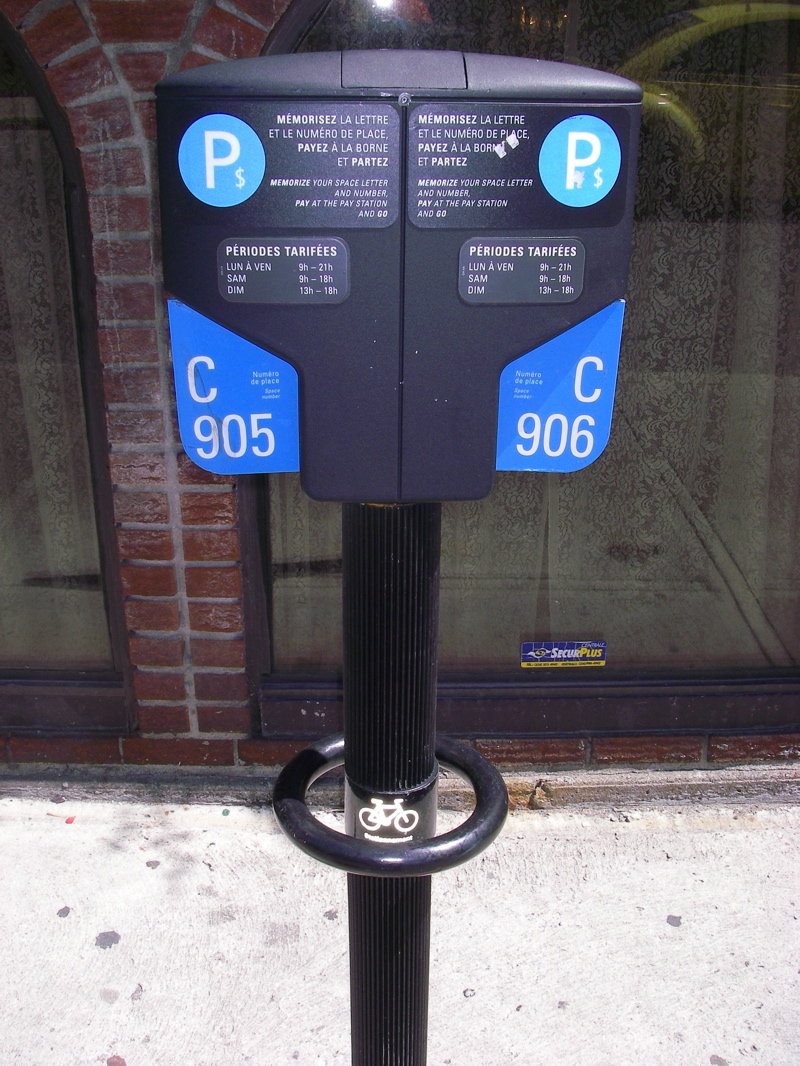
Car parking meter with integrated bicycle lock ring (Montreal, Canada)

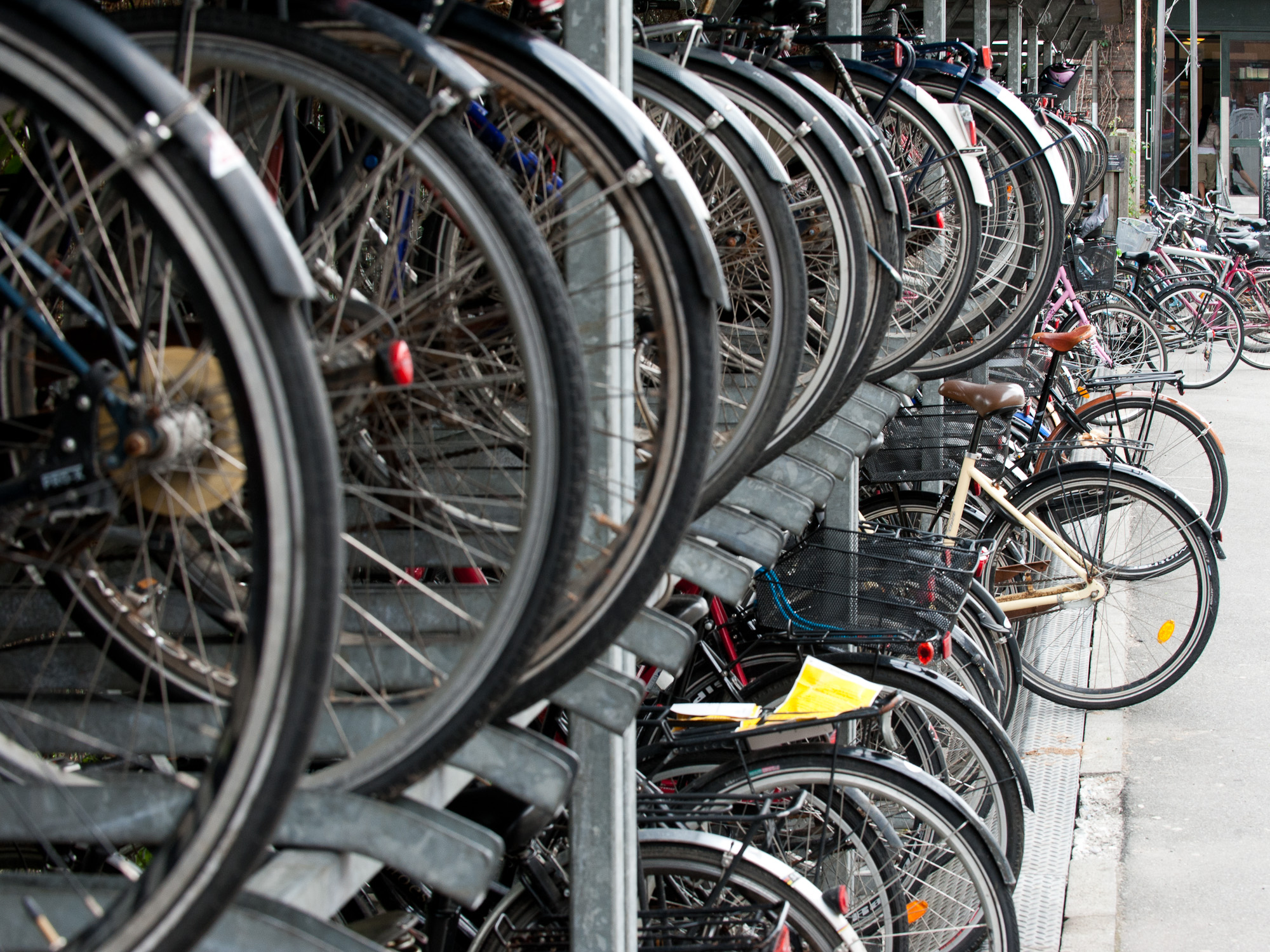
Multi-level bike racks and storage facilities

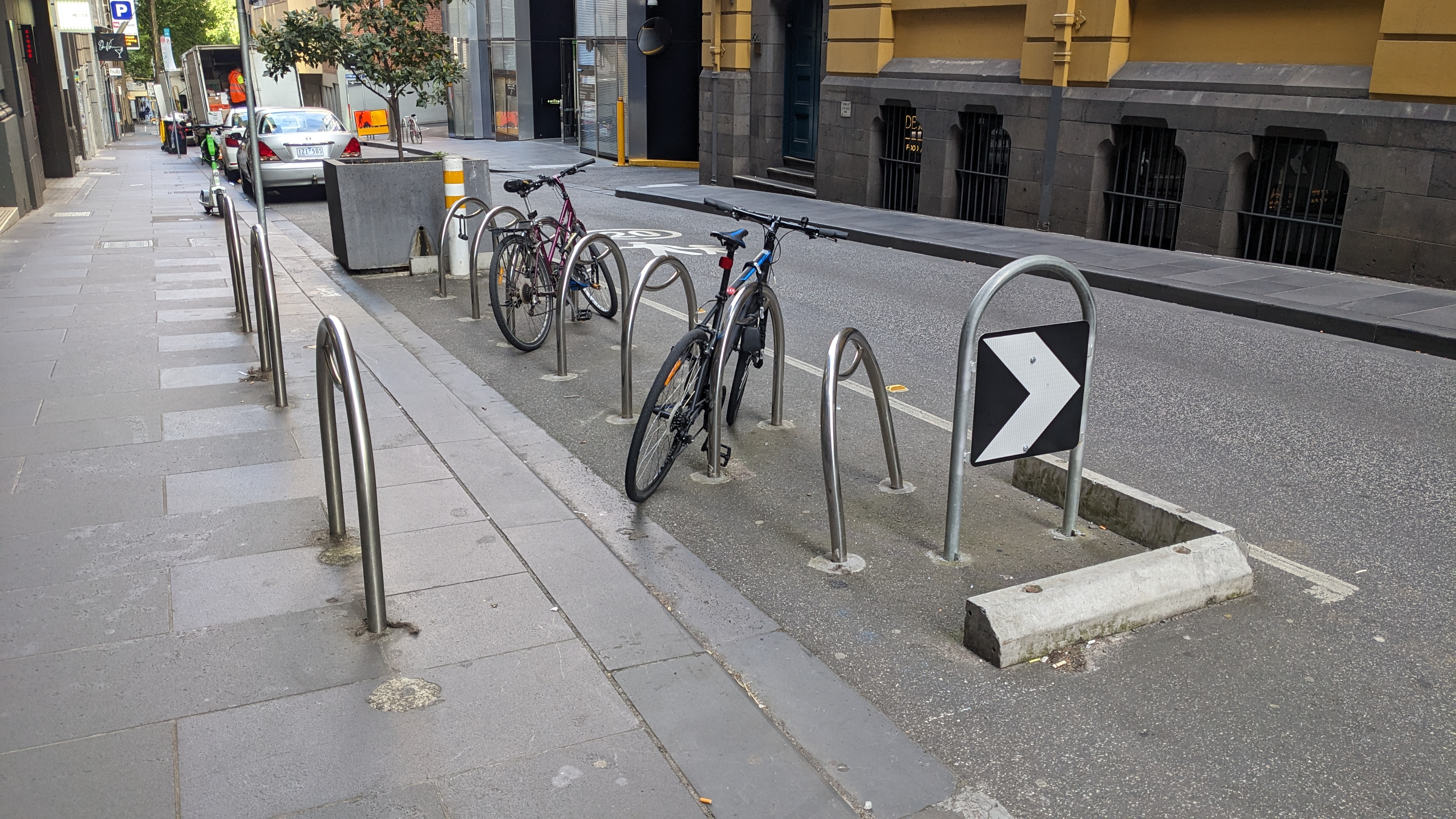
Bicycle parking corral replacing a kerbside car parking space in Melbourne, Australia.

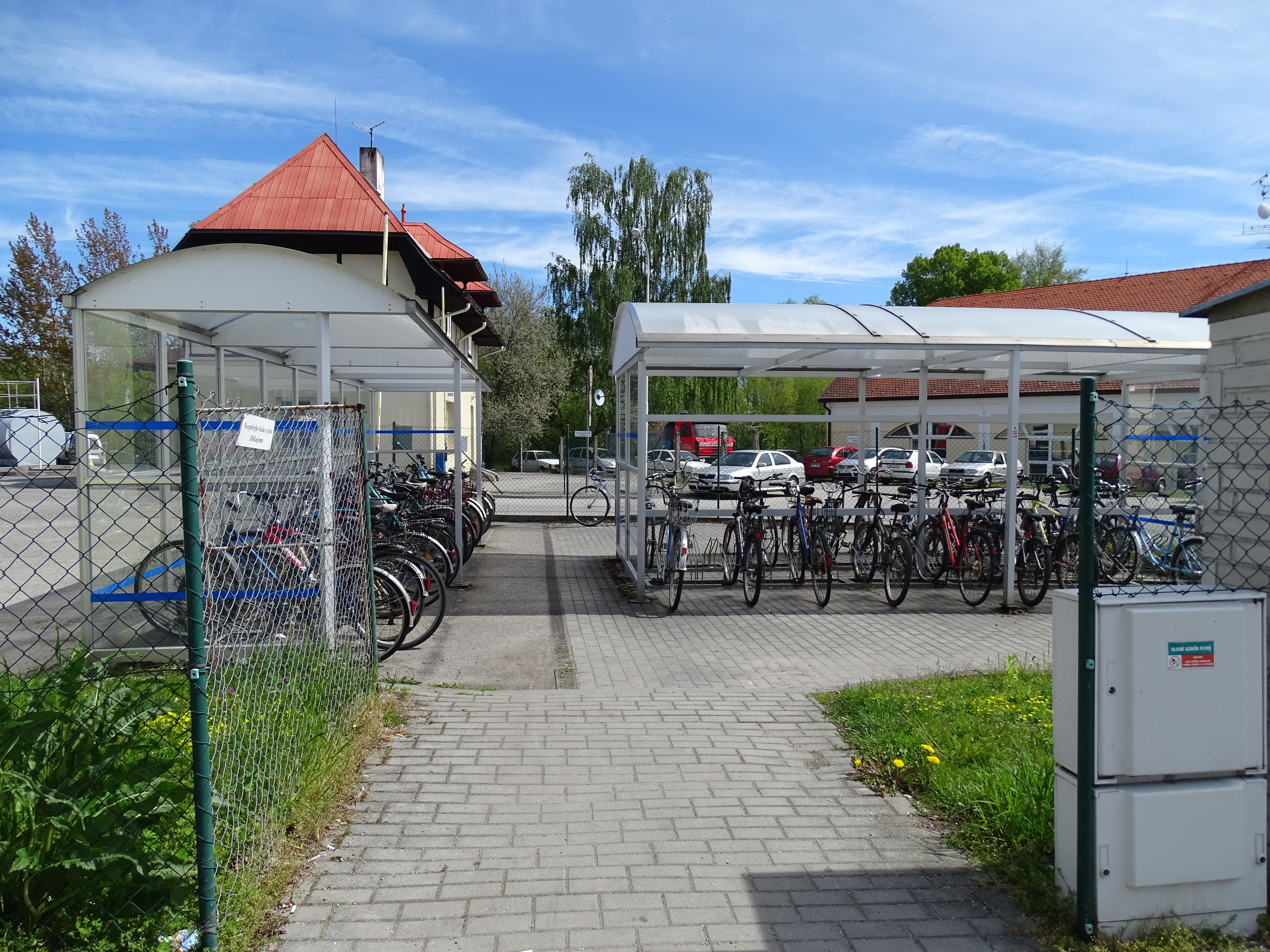
Bicycle parking in the Czech Republic

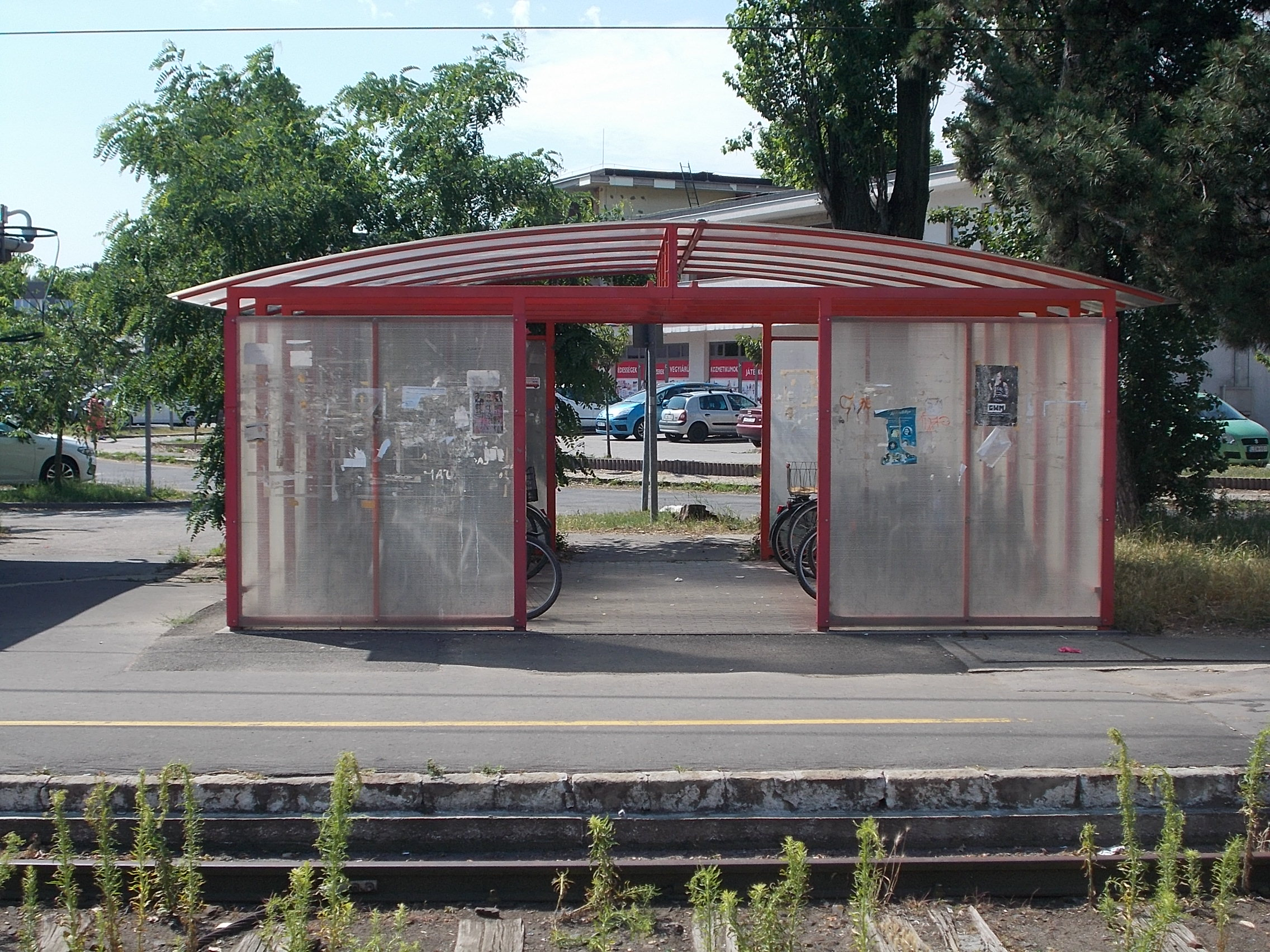
A bicycle shelter in Hungary

Bike racks

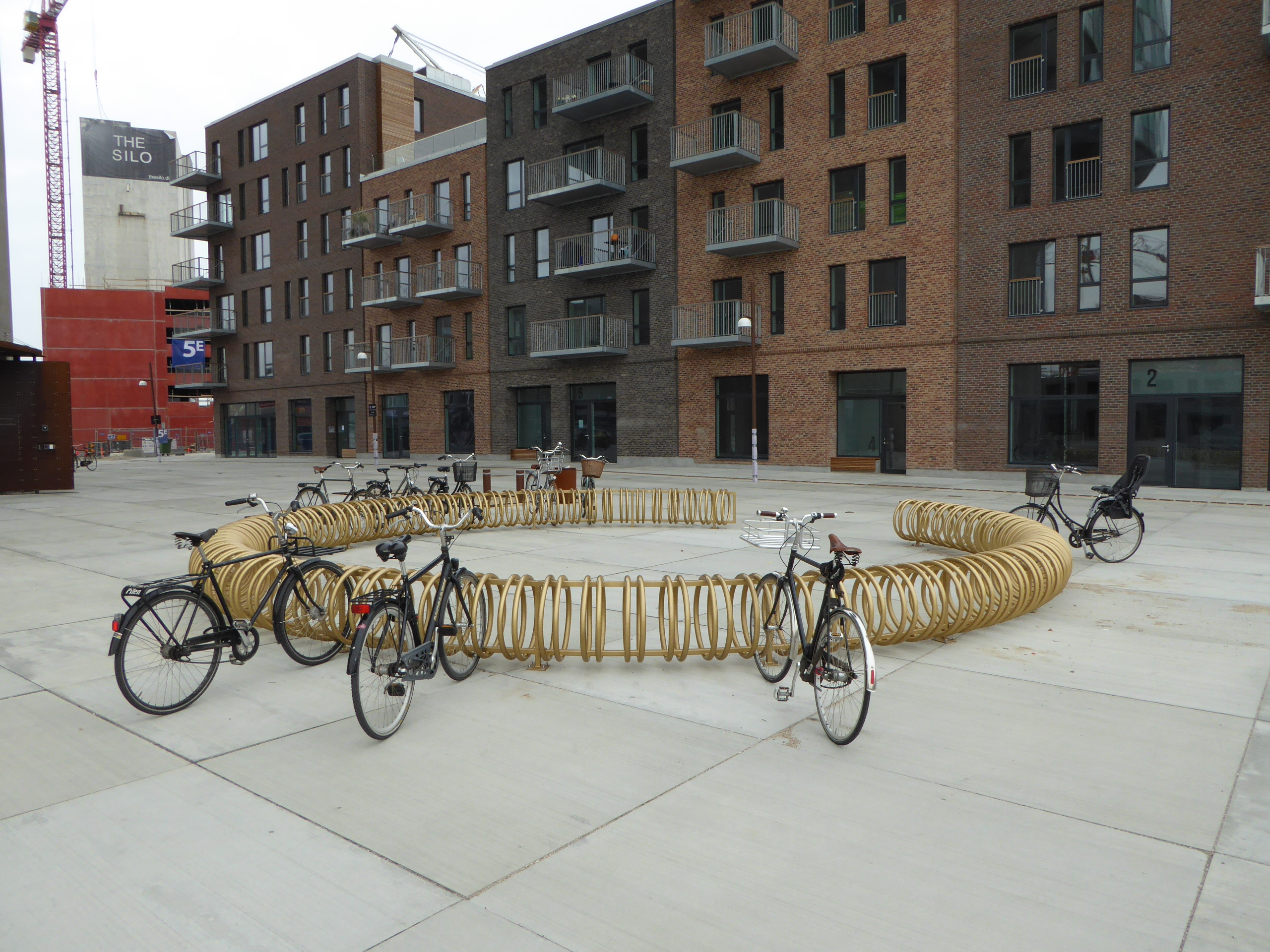
Bike racks with a decorative value

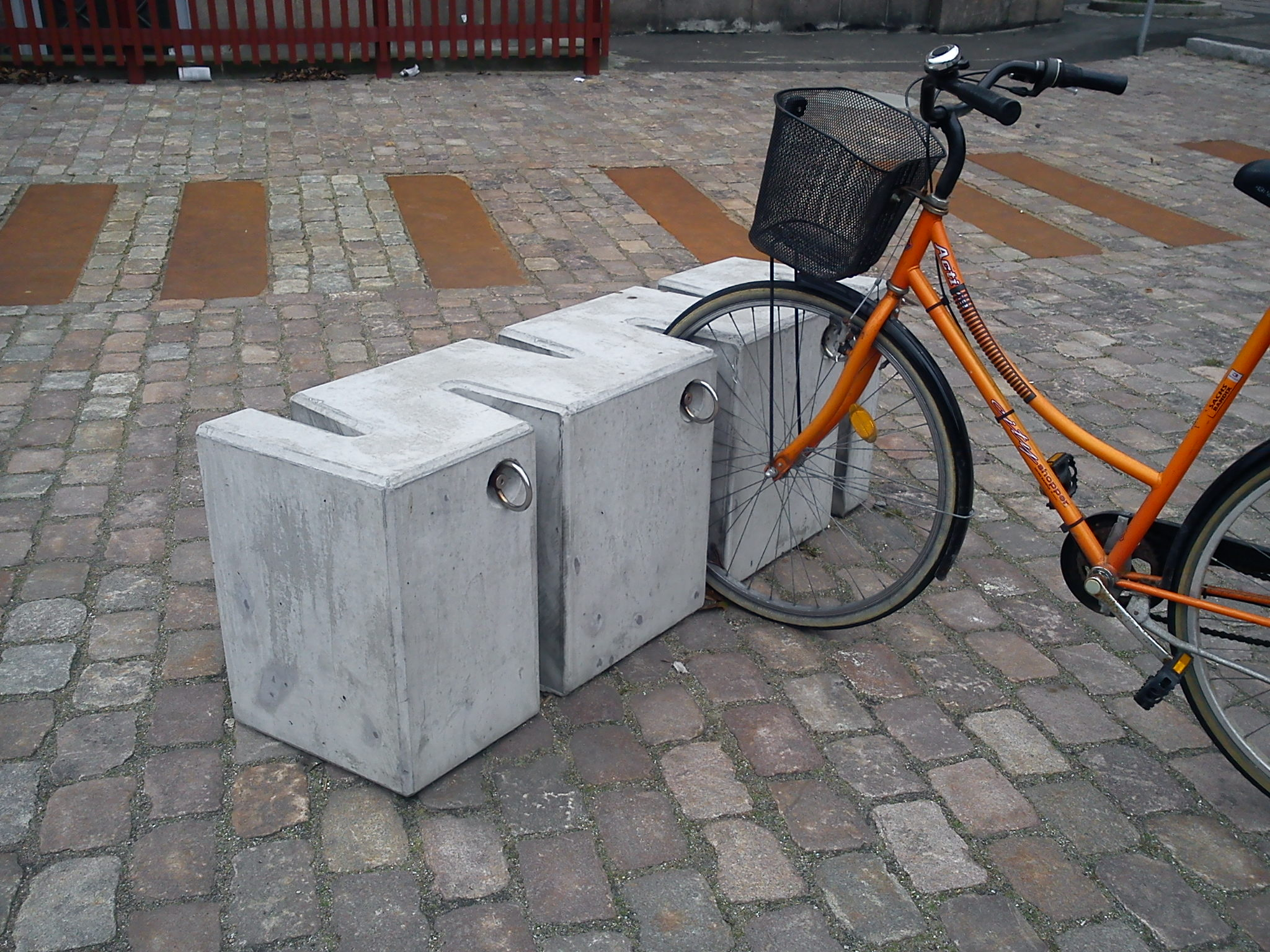
Temporary, moveable bike rack in heavy concrete

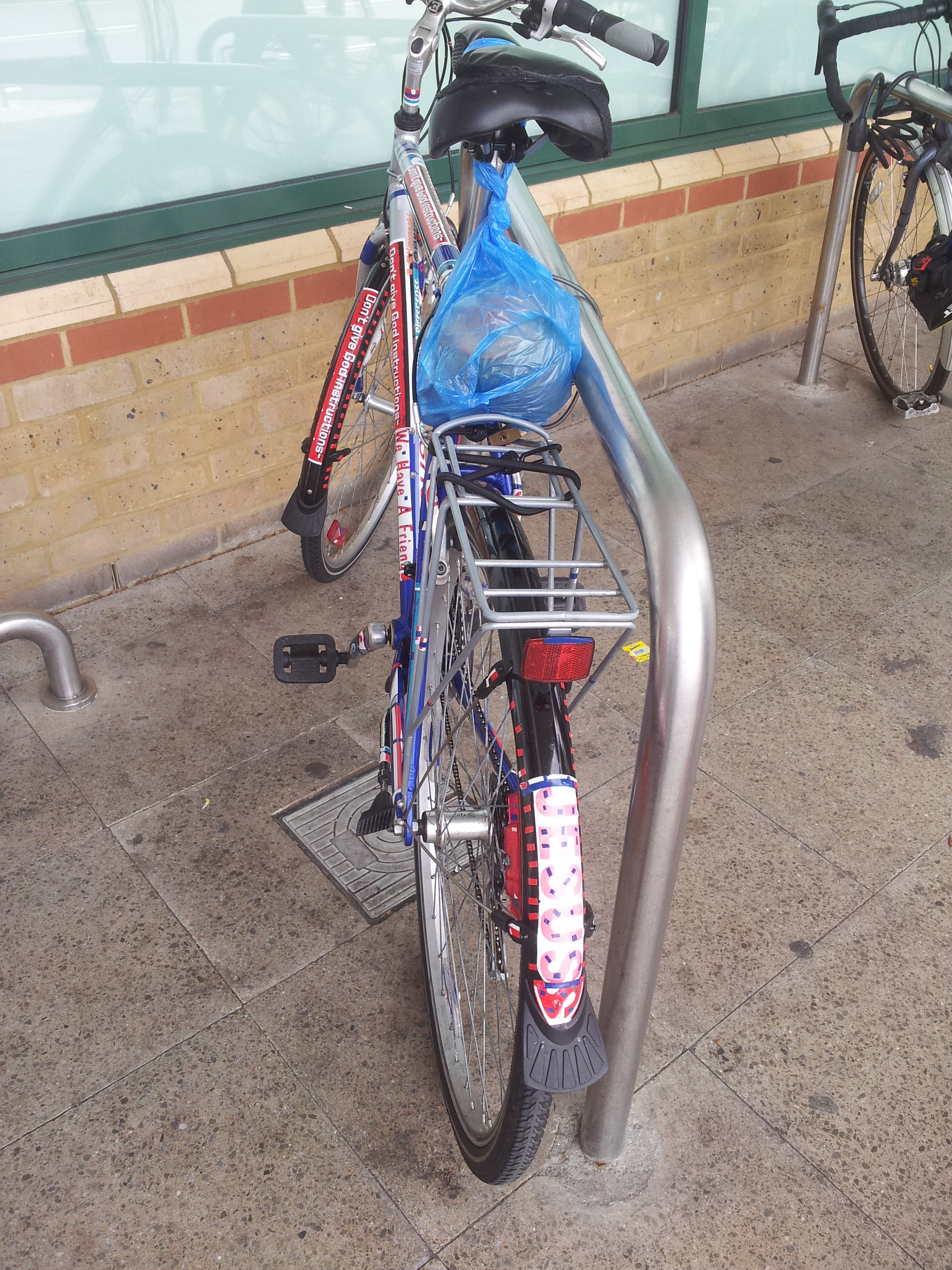
Fastened steel poles

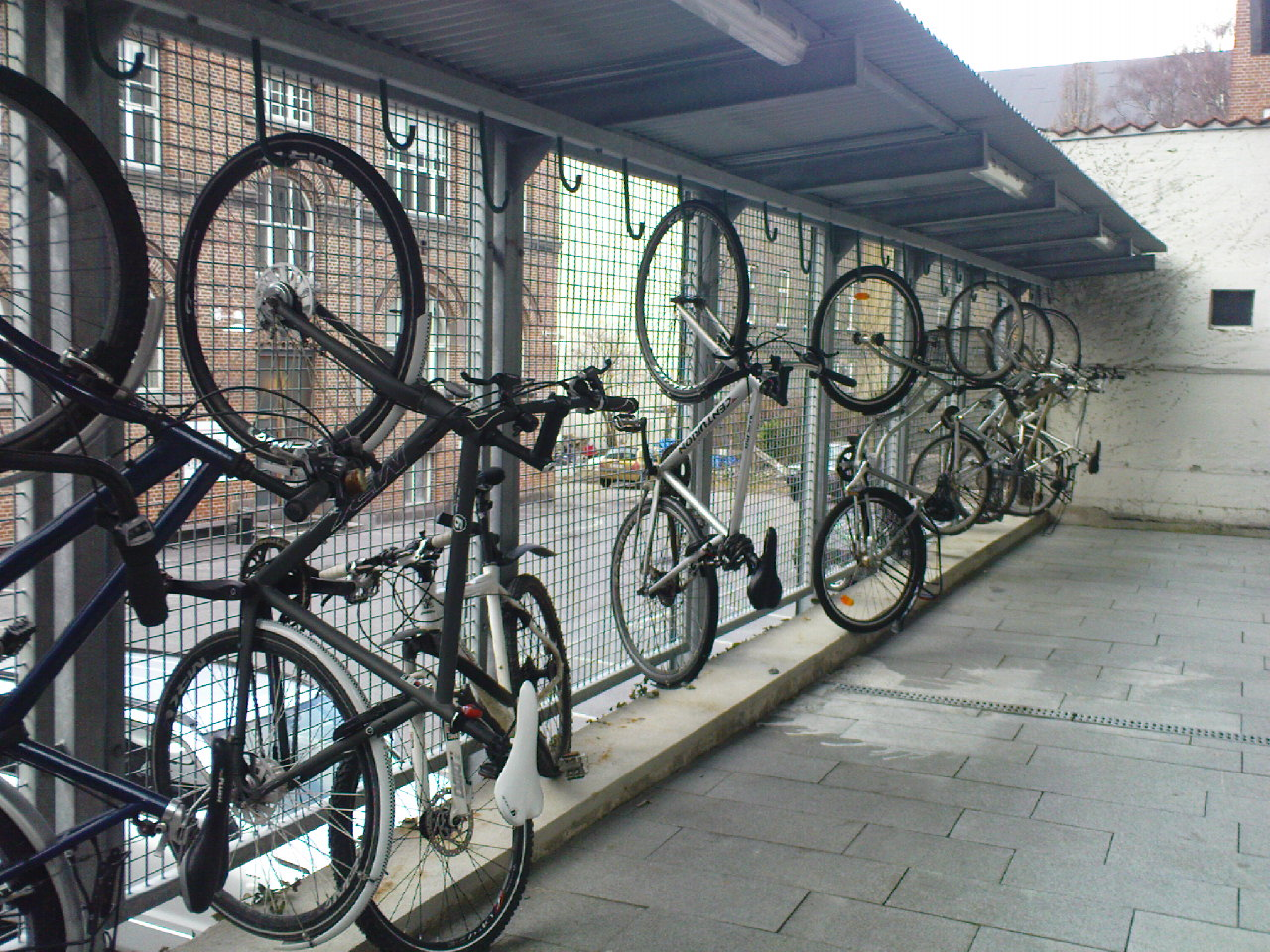
Up-side down parking saves space

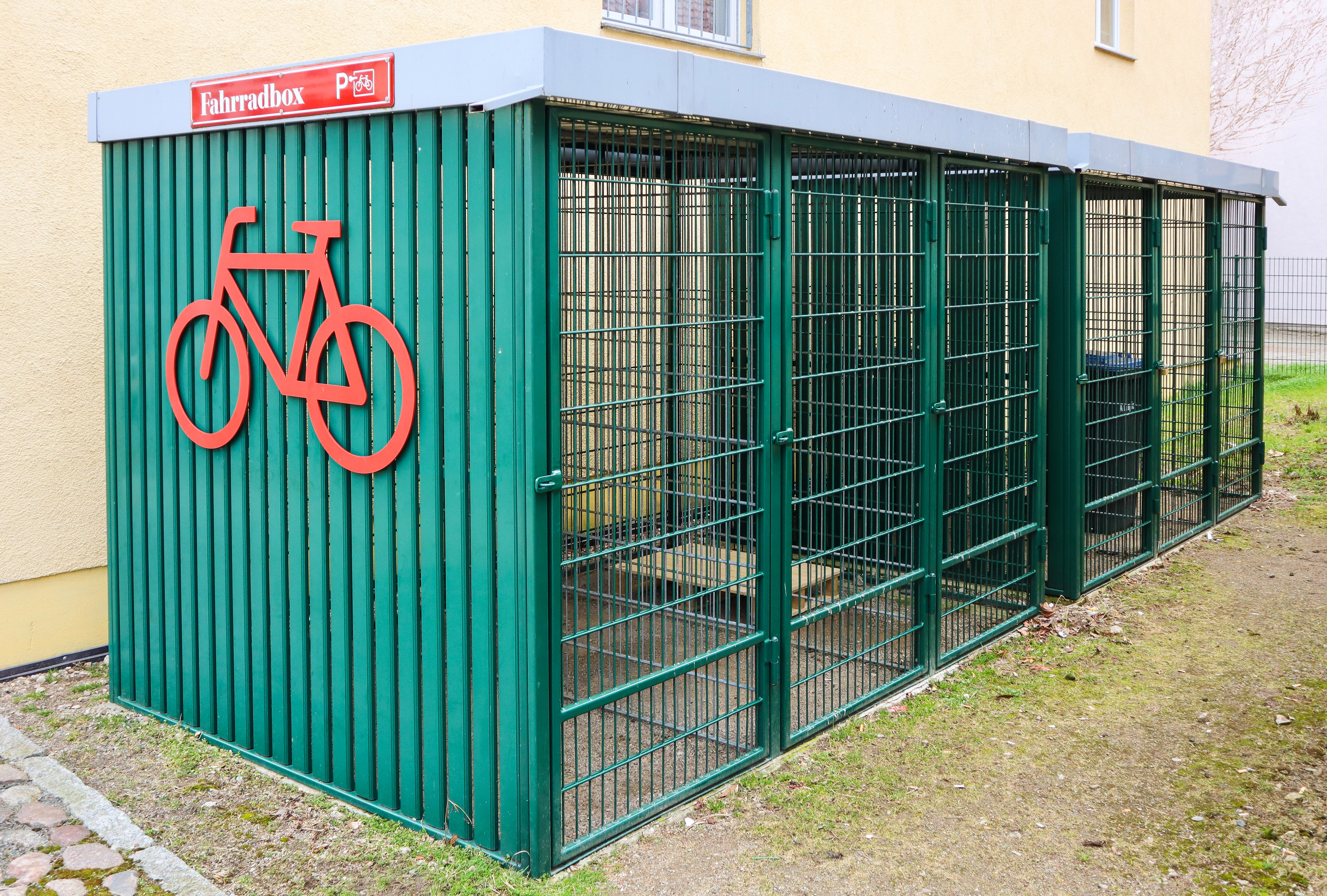
Bicycle shelters with locks

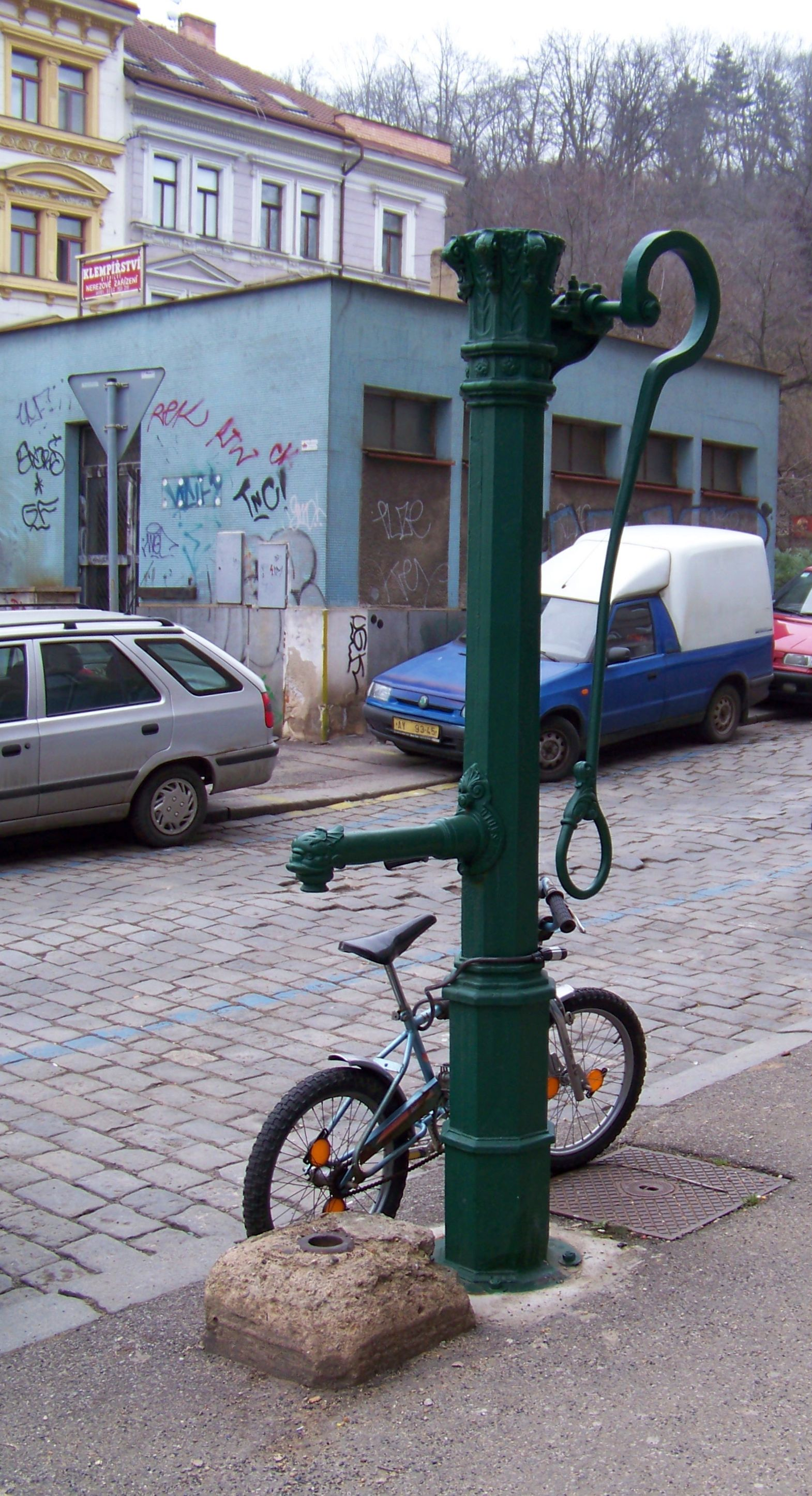
Opportunistic parking

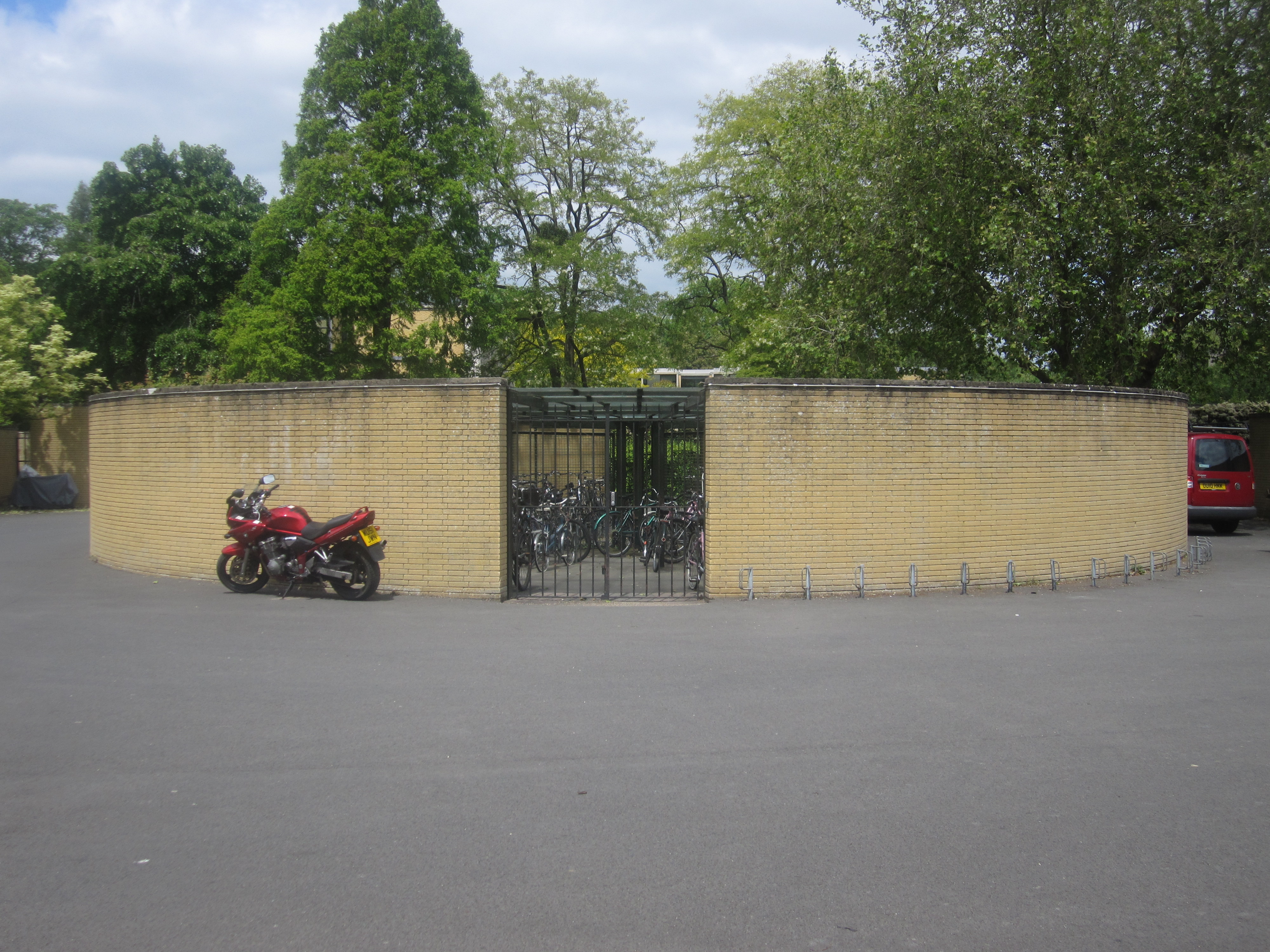
Grade I listed bicycle store at St Catherine's College, Oxford, England

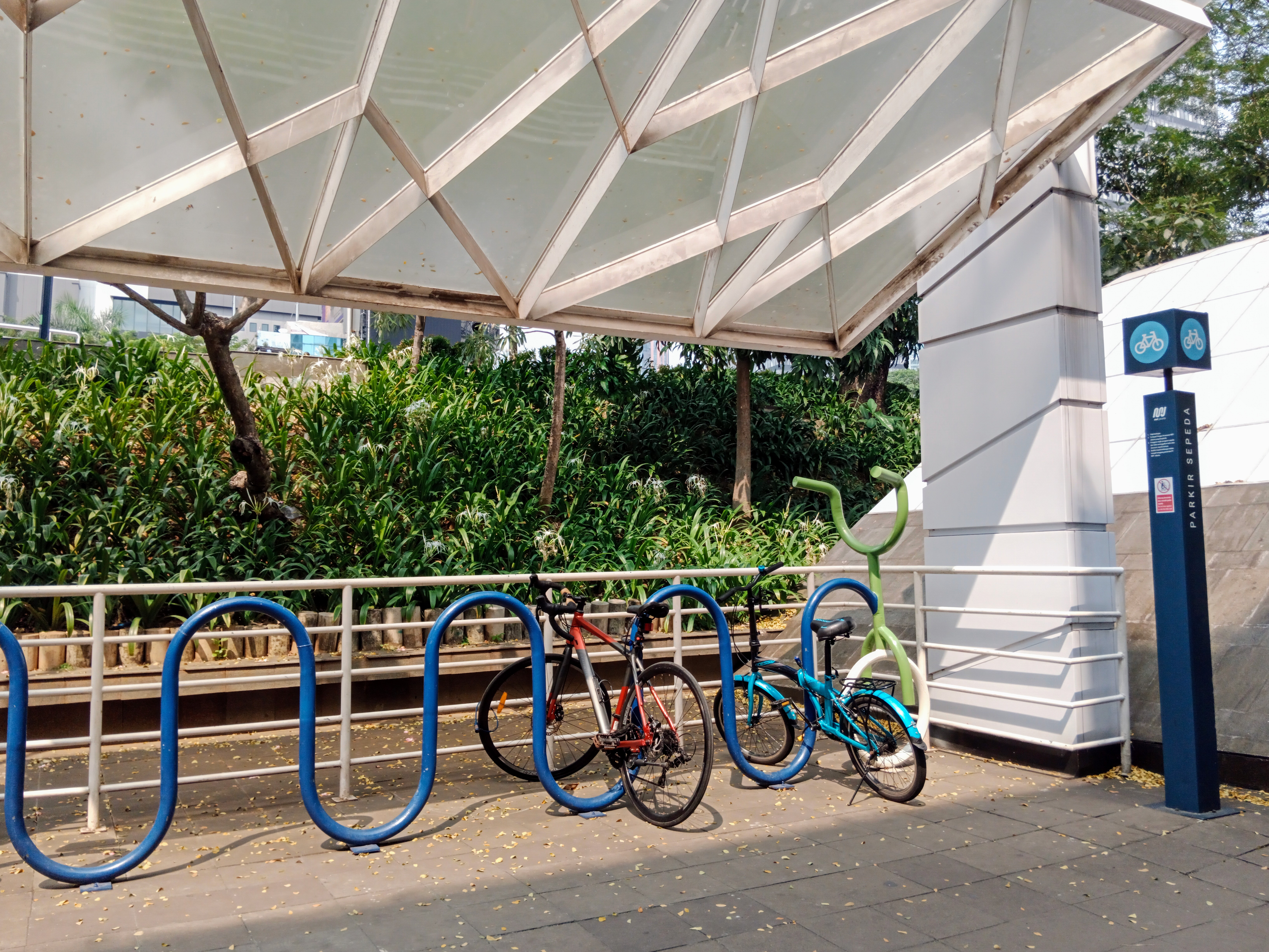
Bike racks located in front of the MRT stop entrance

== See also ==
- Outline of cycling
