= Co-modality =

Transport policy

Co-modality is a notion introduced by the European Commission in 2006 in the field of the transport policy to define an approach of the globality of the transport modes and of their combinations.

== Description ==
For the European Commission co-modality refers to a "use of different modes on their own and in combination" in the aim to obtain "an optimal and sustainable utilisation of resources".

This notion introduces a new approach to the European transport policy in which one do not seek, like in the 2001 white paper, to oppose transport modes one to another, i.e. opposing roads to its alternatives, but rather to find an optimum exploiting the domains of relevance of the various transport modes and of their combinations.

== Controversy ==
The transition from the support of intermodality and multimodality as exposed in the 2001 white paper to the notion of co-modality has been seen by many observers of the sector of transport as the sign of the abandonment of a policy oriented towards the development of the alternatives to the road mode.

== See also ==
- Cycle lane
