= Austin 8 =

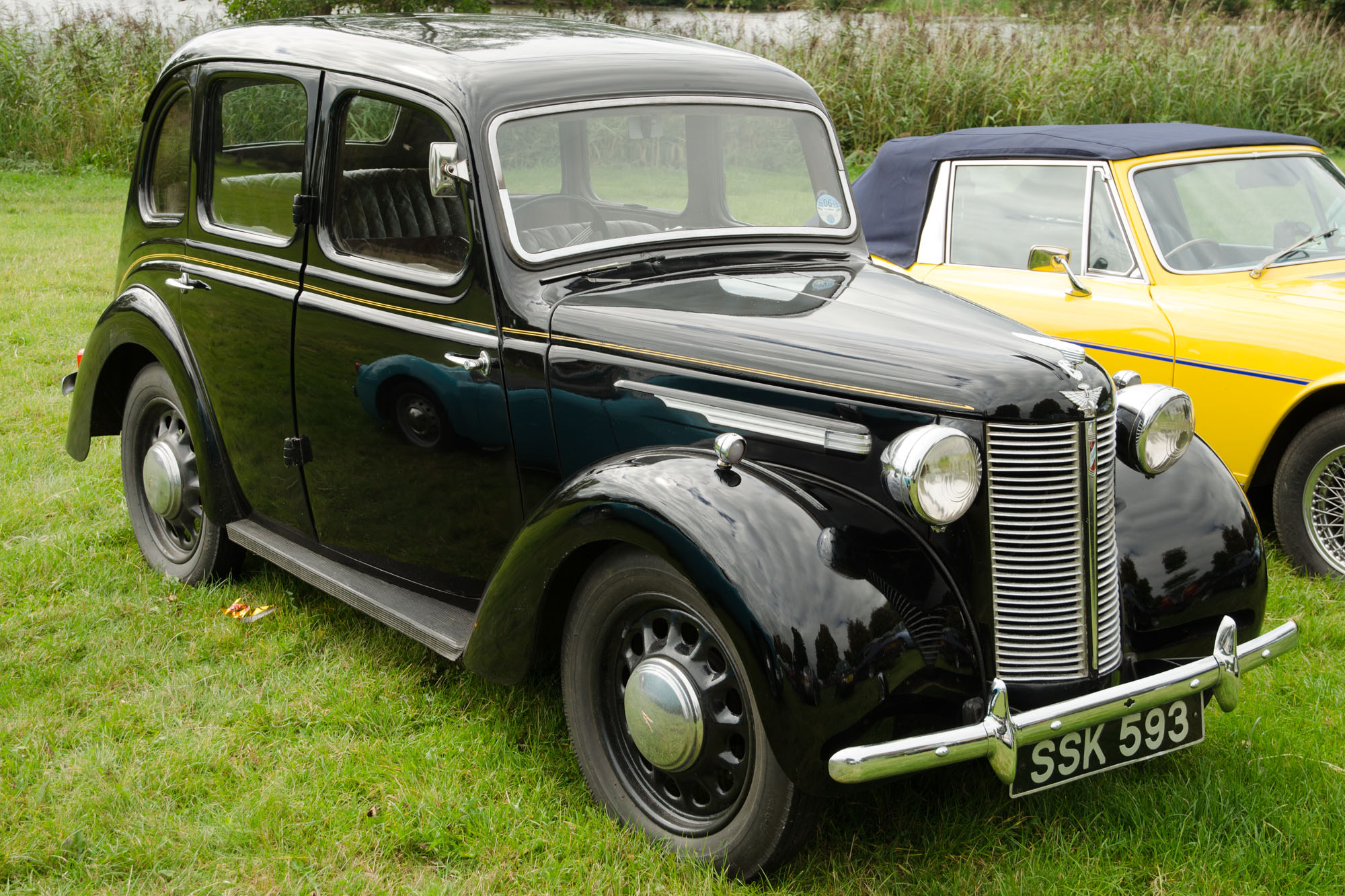
- 1946 Austin 8 4-door saloon

Overview
- Manufacturer: Austin
- Also called: Austin Wasp (Australia)
- Production: 1939–1948; 56,103 produced
- Assembly: United Kingdom: Longbridge (Longbridge plant); Australia: Melbourne

Body and chassis
- Body style: 2-door saloon; 4-door saloon; 2-door, 2 -seat tourer; 2-door 4-seat tourer; 2-door van

Powertrain
- Engine: 900 cc side-valve I4
- Transmission: 4-speed manual

Dimensions
- Wheelbase: 88 in (2,235 mm)
- Length: 149 in (3,785 mm)
- Width: 56 in (1,422 mm)

Chronology
- Predecessor: Austin Big 7
- Successor: Austin A30

The Austin 8 is a small car which was produced by Austin between 1939 and 1948.

Launched on 24 February 1939, production continued into the war until 1943. Approximately 9,000 - 9,500 of the wartime Austin models were two-seater military 8AP tourers produced for the armed services and government, and the rest were four light saloons, six light saloons, two and four seater tourers and vans. After World War II, the model was made from 1945 until 1948.

By the late 1930s, sales of Austin's big seller, the Austin 7, were declining and the 1938 addition to the range of the 900 cc "Big 7" did little to fill the demand, as despite its larger engine its suspension and handling were still rooted in its early 1920s origins. A restyled and re-engineered range of cars had started to appear in 1937 with the Cambridge 10 with its much more streamlined look, and following the arrival of Leonard Lord development of a proper 8 hp car was accelerated. First the "new" engine was advertised to be 27HP, but later it was corrected to the same rate as the Big 7, which was 24HP.

The new car, which was displayed to dealers in February 1939, kept the 900 cc, four-cylinder, side-valve engine from the Big 7, now with a higher 6.5:1 compression ratio, but had a completely new chassis. This was halfway to full unitary construction in that the main member was a pressed steel floor pan with a box section welded down each side of the car with three others going across the floor. The body was then bolted to this structure. Suspension was by semi-elliptic leaf springs with hydraulic dampers.

Two- and four-door saloon bodies were made as well as two- and four-seat tourers, and vans. About 47,600 were made before war closed production in 1943. In 1945, production restarted, but there were no more tourers or two-door saloons produced in England. Post-war production of the tourer was however undertaken in Australia.

== Pre war Austin 8 ==
Initially there were four base models of the Austin 8. The model was unnamed and known simply by its RAC horsepower rating, plus the prosaic code that would not have been familiar to many outside the industry and trade.

AR = Austin 8 four door six light saloon.

ARA = Austin 8 two door four light saloon.

AP = Austin 8 tourer, available in two seater and four seater

AV = Austin 8 van

== Military Austin 8AP Tourer ==
Just before and during the war a special Austin 8 "tilly" was manufactured, the Austin 8AP Military Tourer. Exact manufacturing numbers are not known but according to several sources the number would have been between 9000 and 9500 vehicles, most of them for Royal Army Service. The Military 8AP Tourer is recognised by, vertical louvres in the side bonnet plates of the car instead of horizontal ones, woodwork on the lower part of the windscreen, oil filled air filter, key-less ignition switch, closed wheels instead of pressed spoke wheels, pressed steel grille instead of sectioned cast grille.

== Post war Austin 8 ==
After the war the Austin 8 was manufactured in a slightly different way than the pre-war 8s. The main differences were: steering wheel, chrome plated head lights instead of spray painted ones, horizontal air filter instead of vertical air filter, over riders on the bumpers, full back bumper instead of quarter ones, trunk handle, moveable licence plate carrier on the trunk lid, cast steel gear box instead of aluminium one. Only two models were available after the war, the six light four door saloon and the van. The tourer and the four light two door saloon were no longer available.

AS1 = Austin 8 four door six light saloon

AV1 = Austin 8 van

== Gallery ==
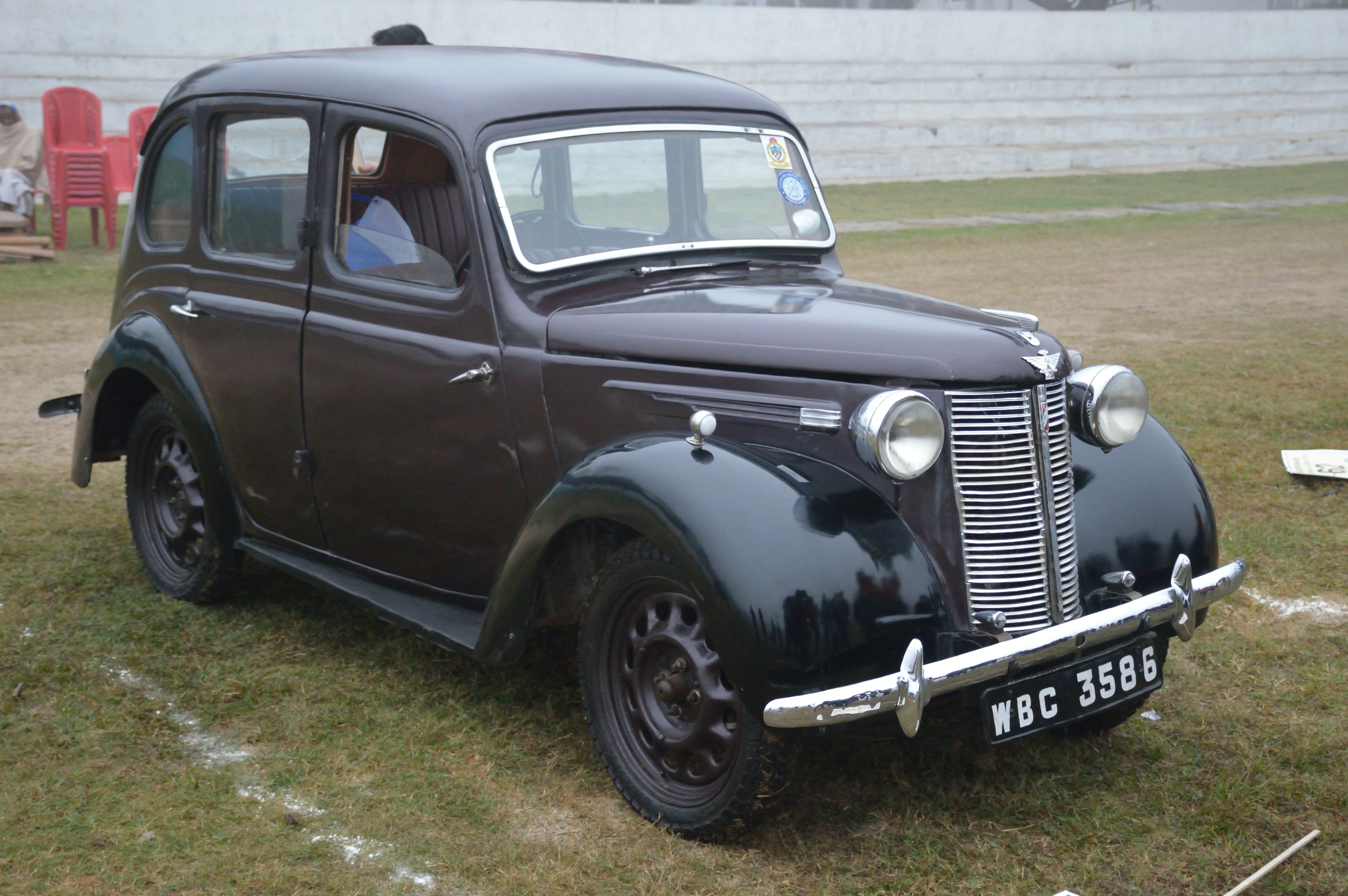
4-door Saloon 1939

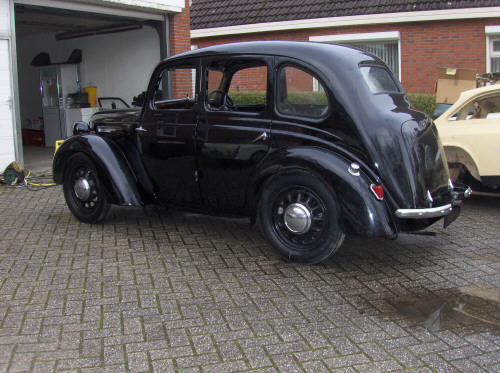
4-door Saloon 1939

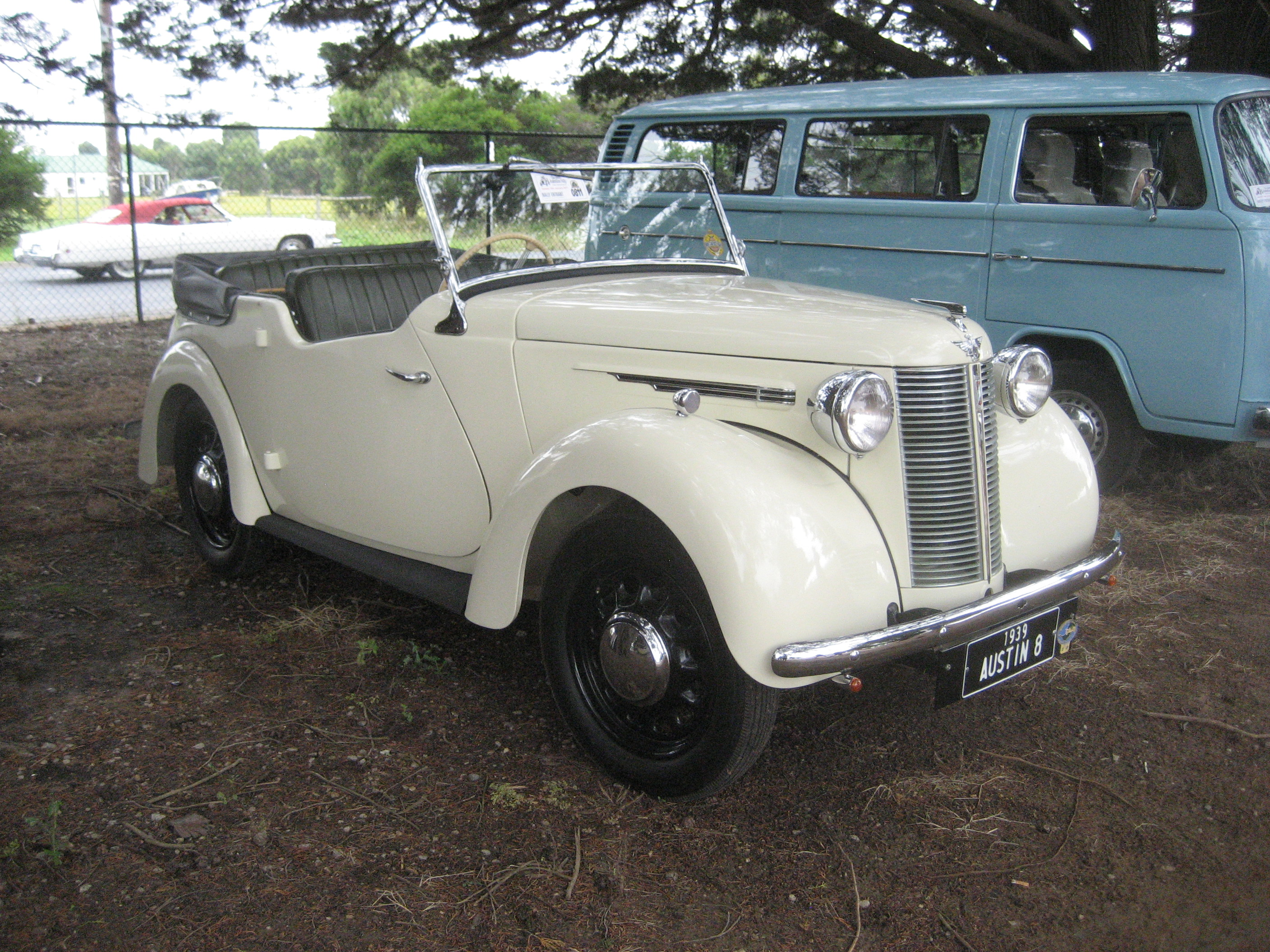
tourer 1939

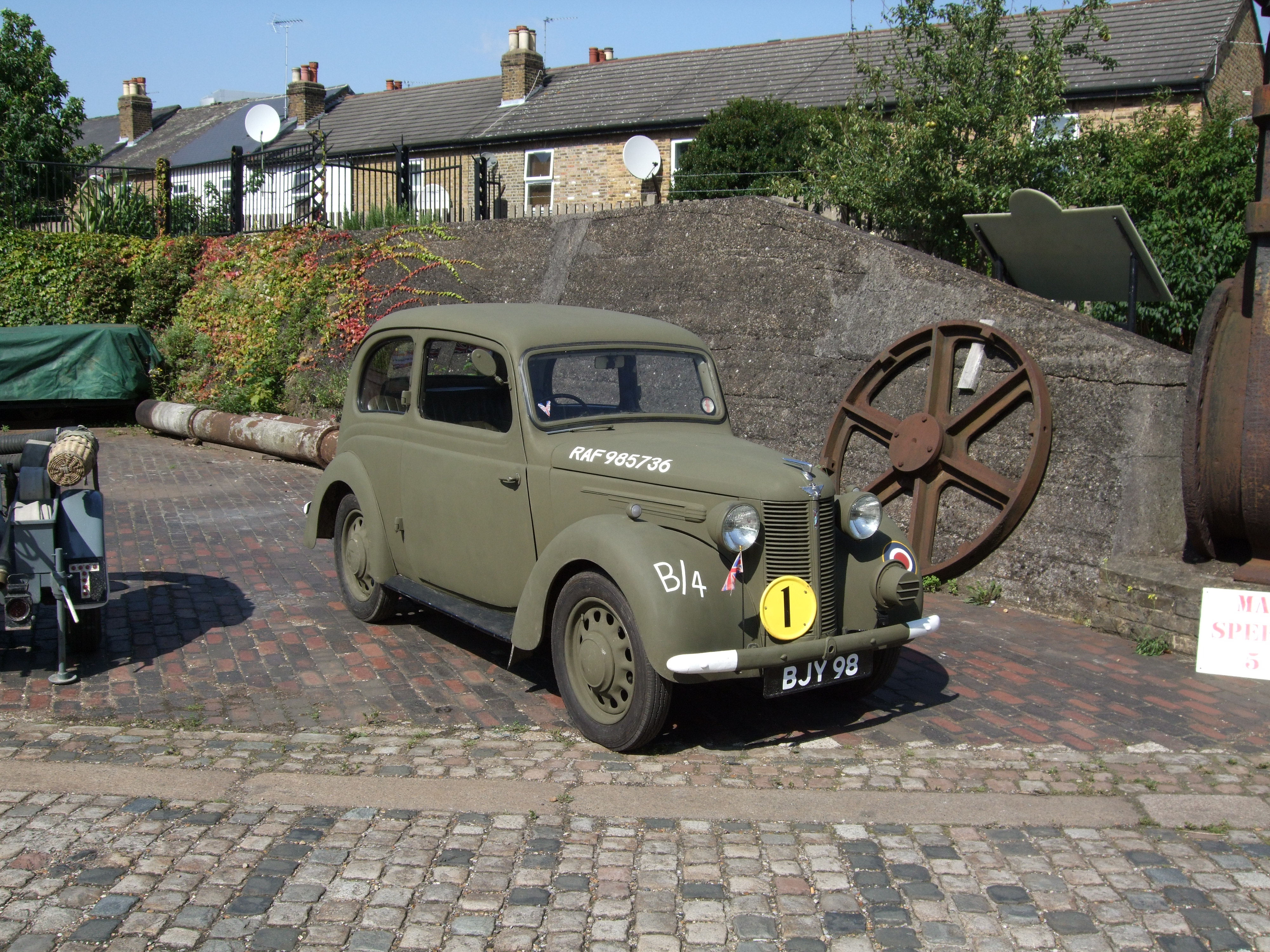
2-door Saloon 1939

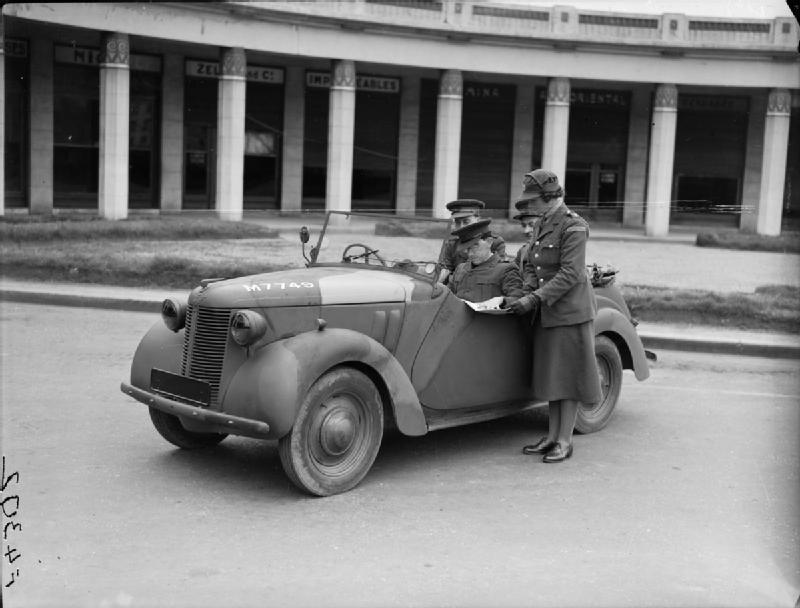
8AP tourer in military use, 9 May 1940

== Australian Austin 8 ==
In an attempt to establish an Australian motor industry after World War I, the Government of Australia imposed a tax on imported cars. However, an imported chassis attracted minimal tax, and as a result Australian coach-builders imported rolling chassis to which they fitted custom-built bodies. The Austin chassis were reputedly shipped with guards (fenders), bonnet and grille surround pressings.

The largest and best of these companies known for the Austin 8 were: Ruskin, Larke Hoskins, Holden and TJ Richards & Sons. The Larke Hoskins Austin 8s were called Austin Wasp and were built both as tourer and saloon. There are even Austin 8 two door Doctor's Coupes know manufactured by Ruskin. The Richards-built Tourers can be recognised by a curved cease in the door panels. 8s were built by Holden at least in 1940/1941/1942 as Austin 8 saloon and Austin 8 saloon Melbourne model.

A coach built Austin 8 tourer utility was discovered in Melbourne in the late eighties and was sold to South Australia for restoration.

Post war Australian Austin 8s were therefore manufactured also as tourer, where in UK this model was not manufactured anymore. The Australian Tourers are slightly different from the original. The front window and seats were changed and some were fitted with a trunk lid, a feature which was not present on the pre war UK tourers.

== Other Austin 8 export models ==
Both post war and pre war Austin 8s export models were manufactured. The Austin 8s were available for the European market as LHD. All other details of the cars were un-changed. The pre war export models for the US market were delivered LHD as well. At least some of the US export models were provided with the closed pressed wheels instead of the pressed spoke wheels used for the cars for the home market. The pressed wheels were of the same model as fitted on the Austin 8AP tourer models and had the same wheel discs as the military ones, although the civilian US wheel discs were chrome plated.

== Austin 8 production records ==
The following list shows the total which was manufactured in each production year (August–July) :

1938–1939: 17447

1939–1940: 24230

1940–1941: 5064

1941–1942: 707

1942–1943: 34

1943–1944: 0

1944–1945: 0

1945–1946: 15169

1946–1947: 31619

1947–1948: 9315

The last pre war chassis number was chassis 47600.

The last chassis was 103585, manufactured in 1948, which suggests that 103,585 Austin 8s were produced. How many were manufactured of each model is not known, since more detailed production records have been destroyed.

== Austin 8 Register ==
Since 1990, there is an Austin Eight Register, started by Ian Pinniger and continued in 2012 by Hermann Egges. Slightly over 100,000 Austin 8s have been manufactured between 1939 and 1948. The register contains information about 400-500 Austin 8s in existence, of which most are post-war six light saloons. The actual number of Austin 8s in existence can be found here. More information about the history of the Austin 8 and the Austin 8 register, can be found on www.austin-eight.com
