= Austin 10 =

Austin Ten
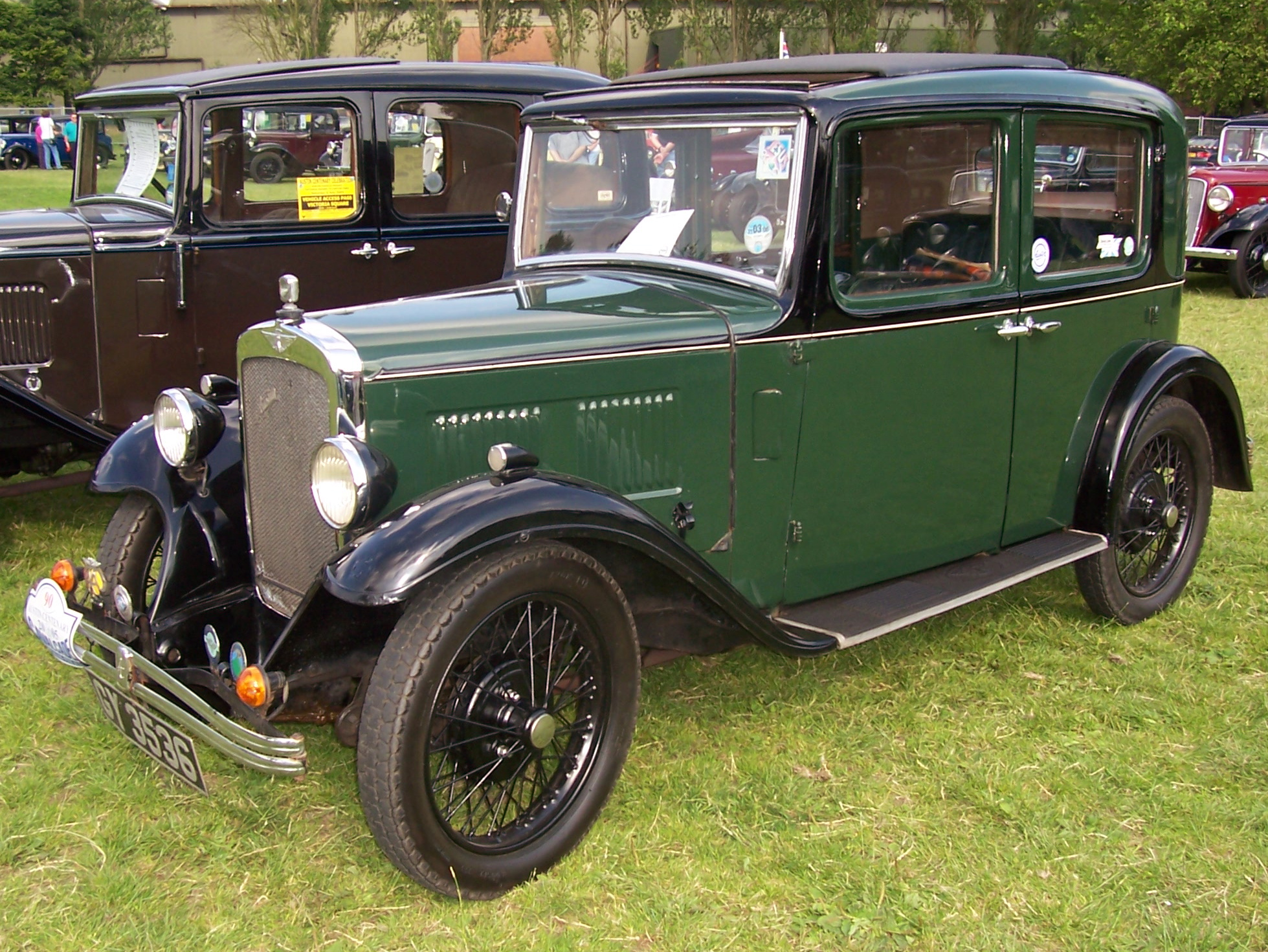
- 4-door saloon first registered 17 June 1932

Overview
- Manufacturer: Austin
- Also called: Austin Ten-Four
- Production: 1932–1947; 290,000 made

Body and chassis
- Body style: Saloons: 4-door 1932–1935; Lichfield 1934–1937; Sherborne 1936–1937; Cambridge 1937–1947; Tourers: 2-seat 1933–1939; 4-seat 1933–1939; Sports: Ripley 1934–1936; Cabriolet: Colwyn 1933–1937; Conway 1937–1939; Van 1933–1947; 2-door pick-up; 2-door Roadster Utility

Powertrain
- Engine: 1,125 cc (69 cu in) 4-cylinder side-valve
- Transmission: a single plate clutch transmits the drive through a 4-speed manual gearbox with constant mesh gears controlled by a centrally placed speed lever to an open propeller shaft with metal universal joints and then to a spiral bevel driven three quarter floating rear axle

Dimensions
- Wheelbase: 7 ft 9 in (93 in; 2,362 mm); track 3 ft 9 in (45 in; 1,143 mm)
- Length: 11 ft 7 in (139 in; 3,531 mm)
- Width: 4 ft 7 in (55 in; 1,397 mm)
- Height: 5 ft 4 in (64 in; 1,626 mm)
- Kerb weight: 15 1/2 cwt (1,736 lb; 787 kg)

Chronology
- Predecessor: none
- Successor: Austin A40

Austin Ten-Four 1125 cc

Overview
- Manufacturer: Austin

Layout
- Configuration: straight-4
- Displacement: 1,125 cc (69 cu in)
- Cylinder bore: 63.5 mm (2.50 in)
- Piston stroke: 89 mm (3.5 in)
- Cylinder block material: cast iron, the crankshaft carried on three bearings, the pistons of low expansion aluminium alloy
- Cylinder head material: detachable
- Valvetrain: side-valve

Combustion
- Fuel system: carburettor supplied by petrol pump, induction and exhaust manifolds cast in one piece to provide a hot spot. ignition by coil and battery
- Fuel type: petrol supplied by pump from a 6 gallons tank at the rear of the car
- Oil system: by gearwheel pump forced to crankshaft, camshaft and big end bearings
- Cooling system: fan and thermosyphon, automatic thermostat

Output
- Power output: 21 bhp (15.7 kW; 21.3 PS) @ 3,400 rpm; 20 bhp (14.9 kW; 20.3 PS) @ 2,600 rpm; Tax rating: 9.996 hp

Chronology
- Predecessor: none
- Successor: Austin A40

The Austin Ten is a small car that was produced by Austin. It was launched on 19 April 1932 and was Austin's best-selling car in the 1930s and continued in production, with upgrades, until 1947. It fitted in between their "baby" Austin Seven which had been introduced in 1922 and their various Austin Twelves which had been updated in January 1931.

== Design ==
The design of the car was conservative with a pressed steel body built on a ladder chassis. The chassis was designed to give a low overall height to the car by dipping down by 2.75 inches (70 mm) between the axles. The 1125-cc four-cylinder side-valve engine producing 21 bhp (15.7 kW) drove the rear wheels through a four-speed gearbox and open drive shaft to a live rear axle. Steering was by worm and wheel. Suspension was by half-elliptic springs all round mounted on silent-bloc bushes and damped by frictional shock absorbers. The four-wheel brakes were cable and rod operated by pedal or by hand lever on the offside of the speed lever. The electrical system was 6 volt. For the first year only, a four-door saloon was made in two versions. The basic model cost £155 and was capable of reaching 55 miles per hour (89 km/h) with an economy of 34 mpg_{‑imp} (8.3 L/100 km) and the Sunshine or De-Luxe with opening roof and leather upholstery at £168. Bumpers were provided. The bare chassis was priced at £120.

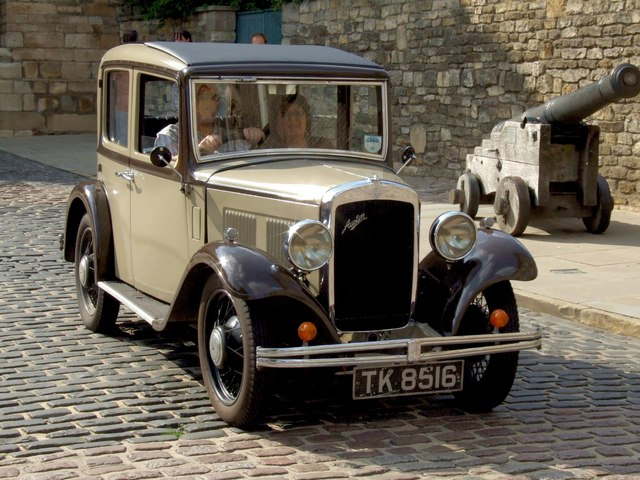
The original Austin Ten

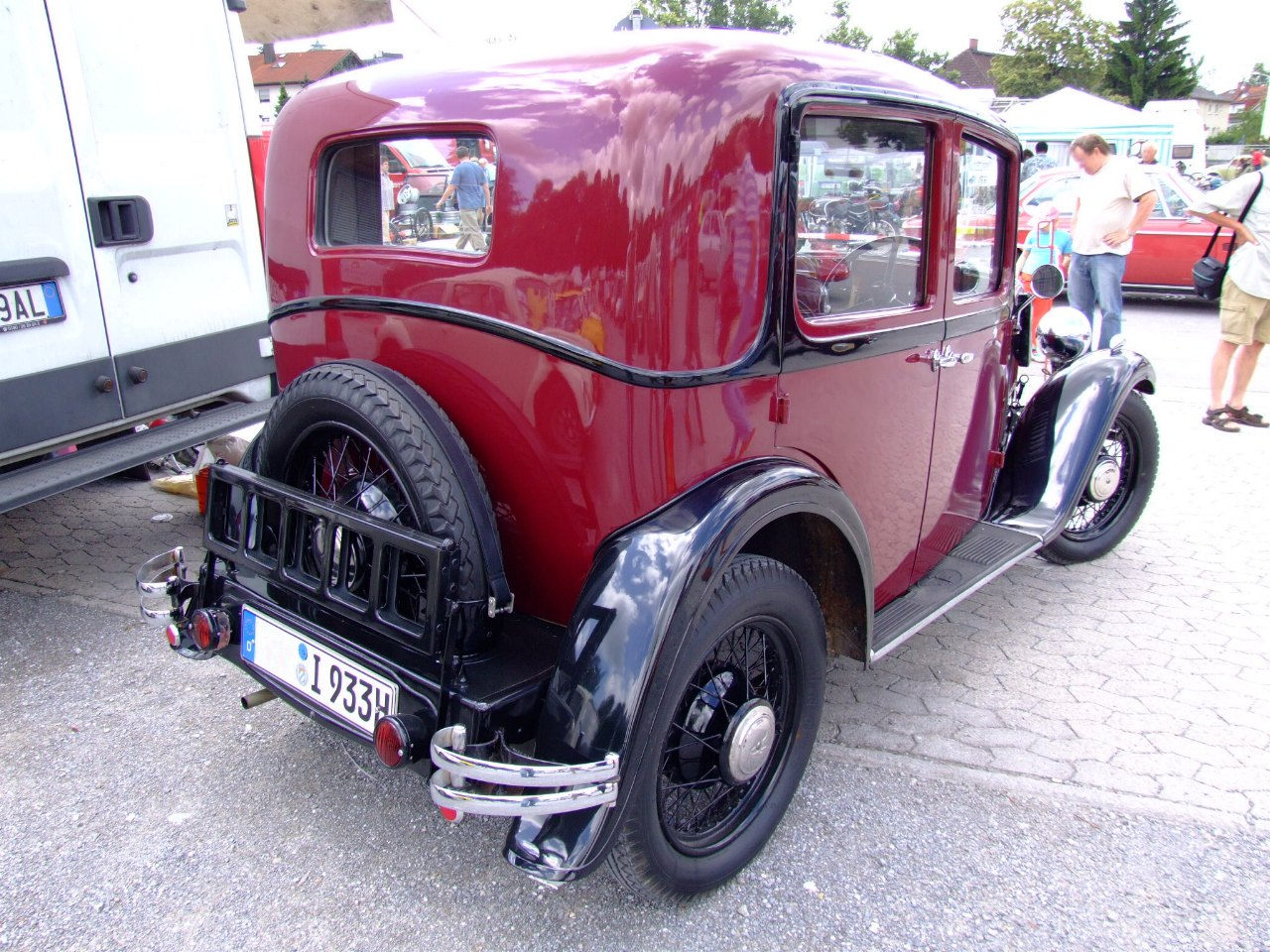

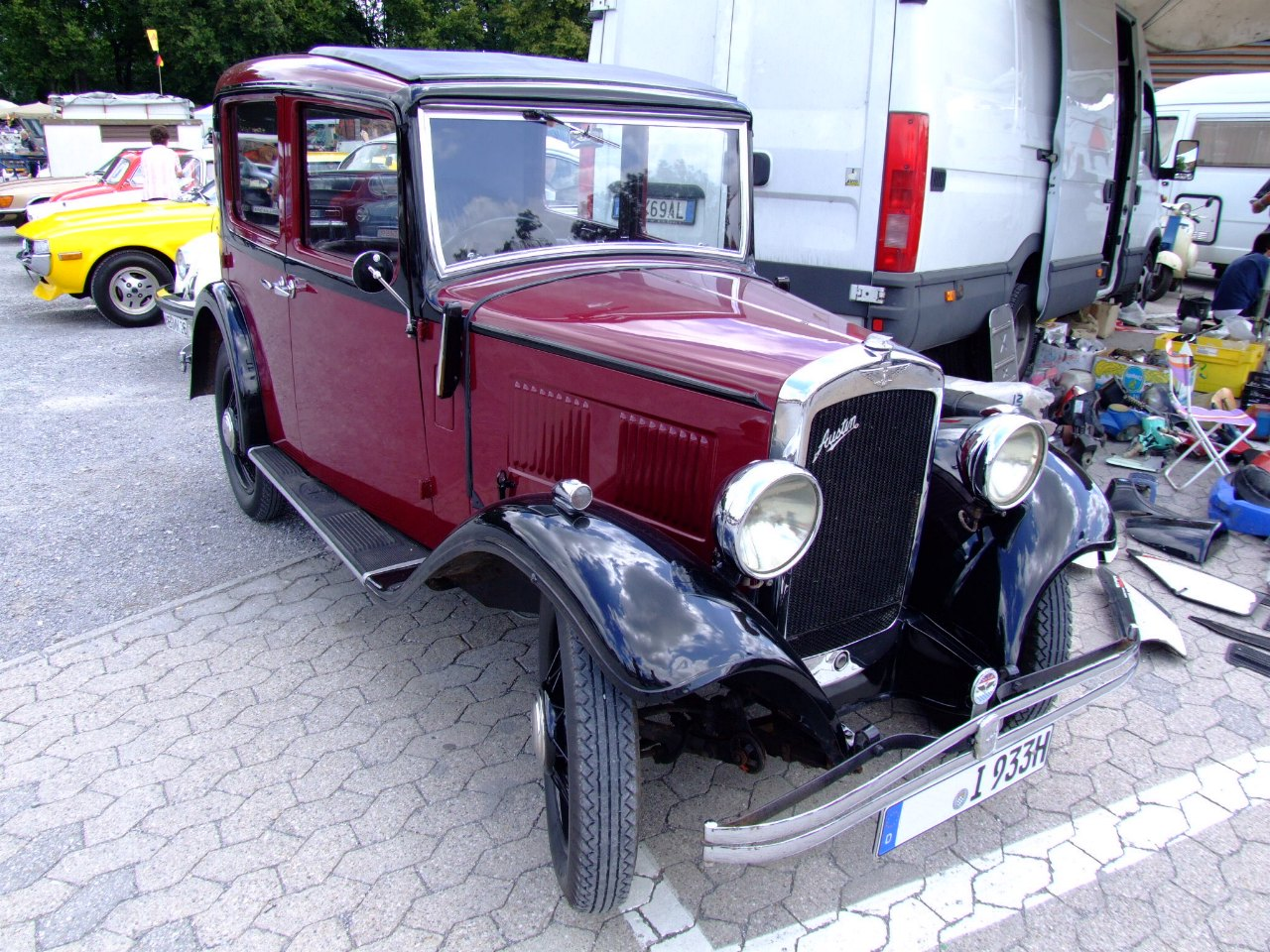

== Road test ==
The greatest comfortable speed was 55 mph though over 50 takes distance and persuasion. 30 to 35 is an effortless cruising rate with light throttle ... The delight of the car lies in the easy speed and in the way it holds the road. The generally well balanced and quiet engine is livelier than some Austins ... The suspension would probably be better with hydraulic shock absorbers. In front one travels very smoothly and the car is undoubtedly stable.

— Motoring Correspondent, The Times
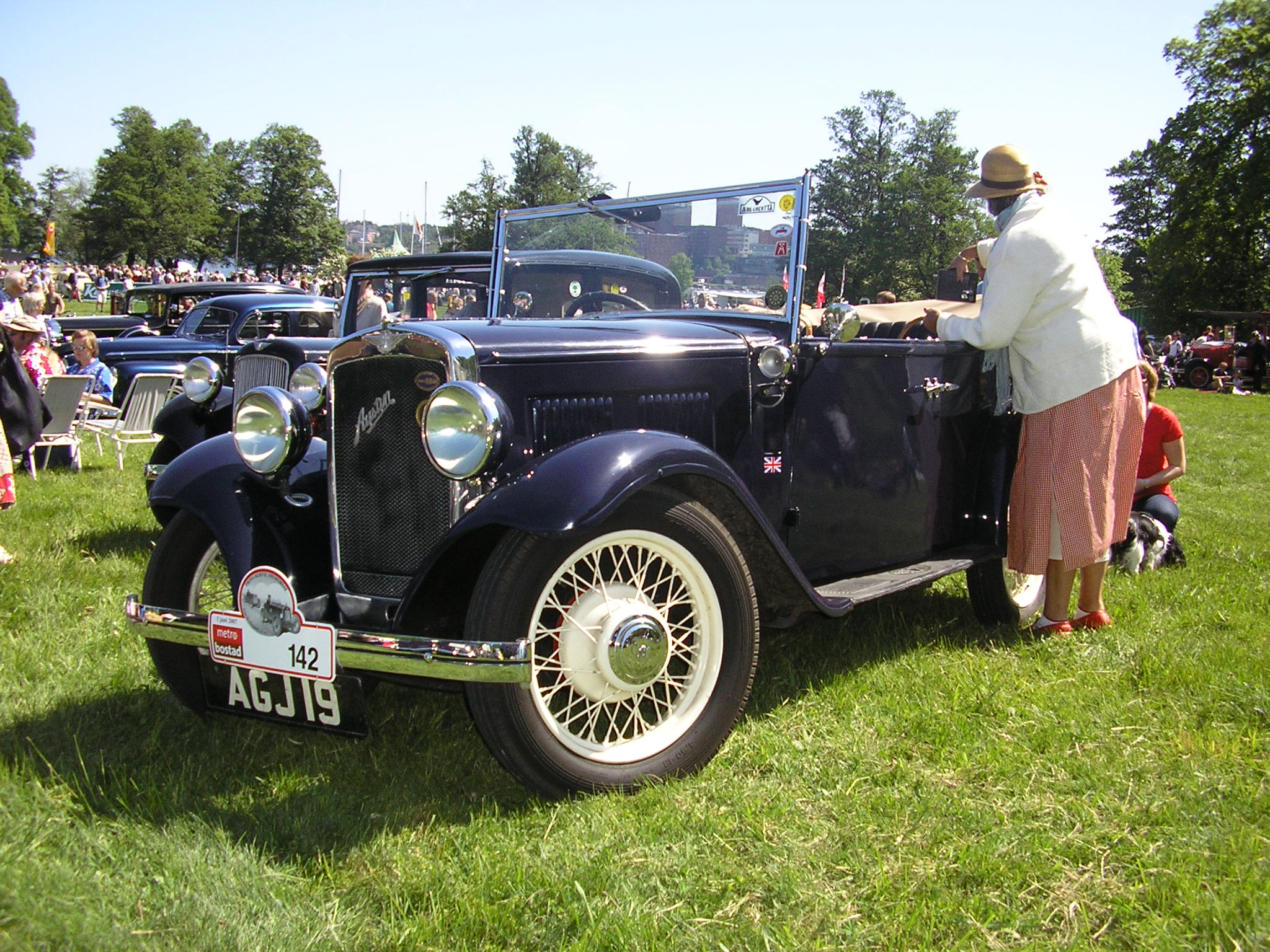
Open Road tourer

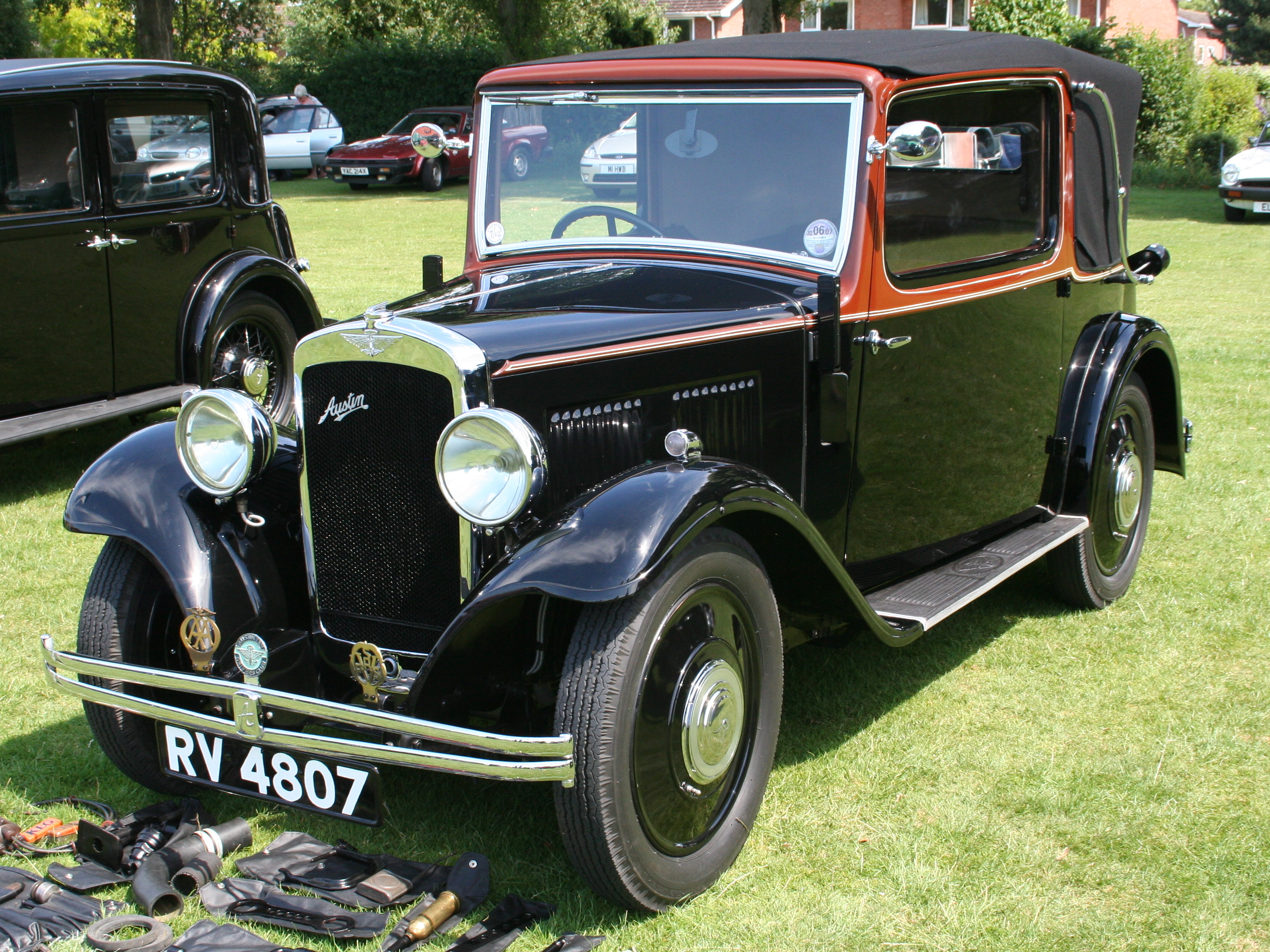
Colwyn cabriolet

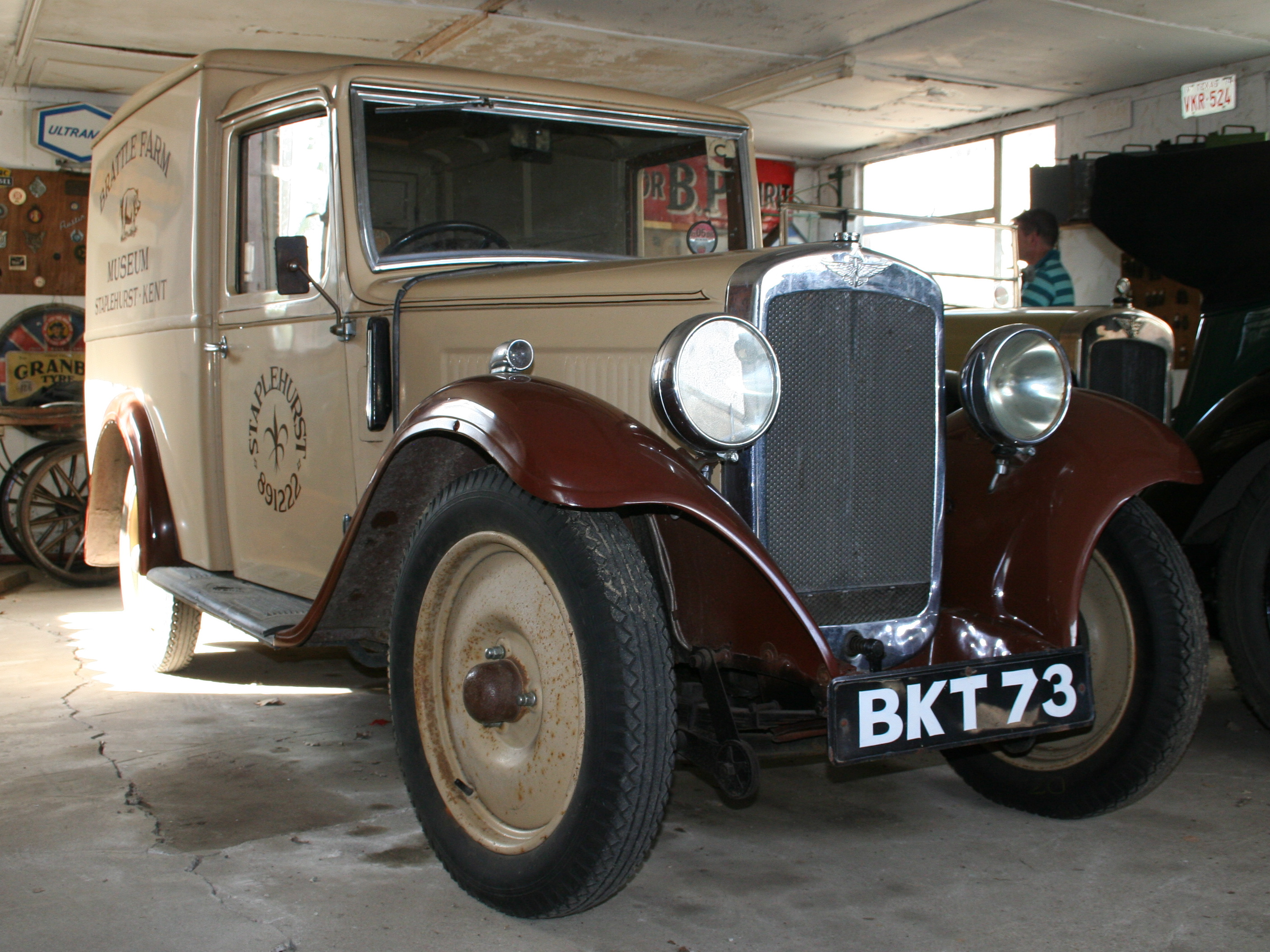
Van

1933 saw the saloons joined by an open two-seater or Open Road tourer, a Colwyn cabriolet and a van. A sports model, the 65 mph (105 km/h), 30 bhp (22 kW) Ripley joined the range in 1934. Mechanical upgrades for 1934 included a stronger chassis, synchromesh on the top two gears and 12-volt electrics.

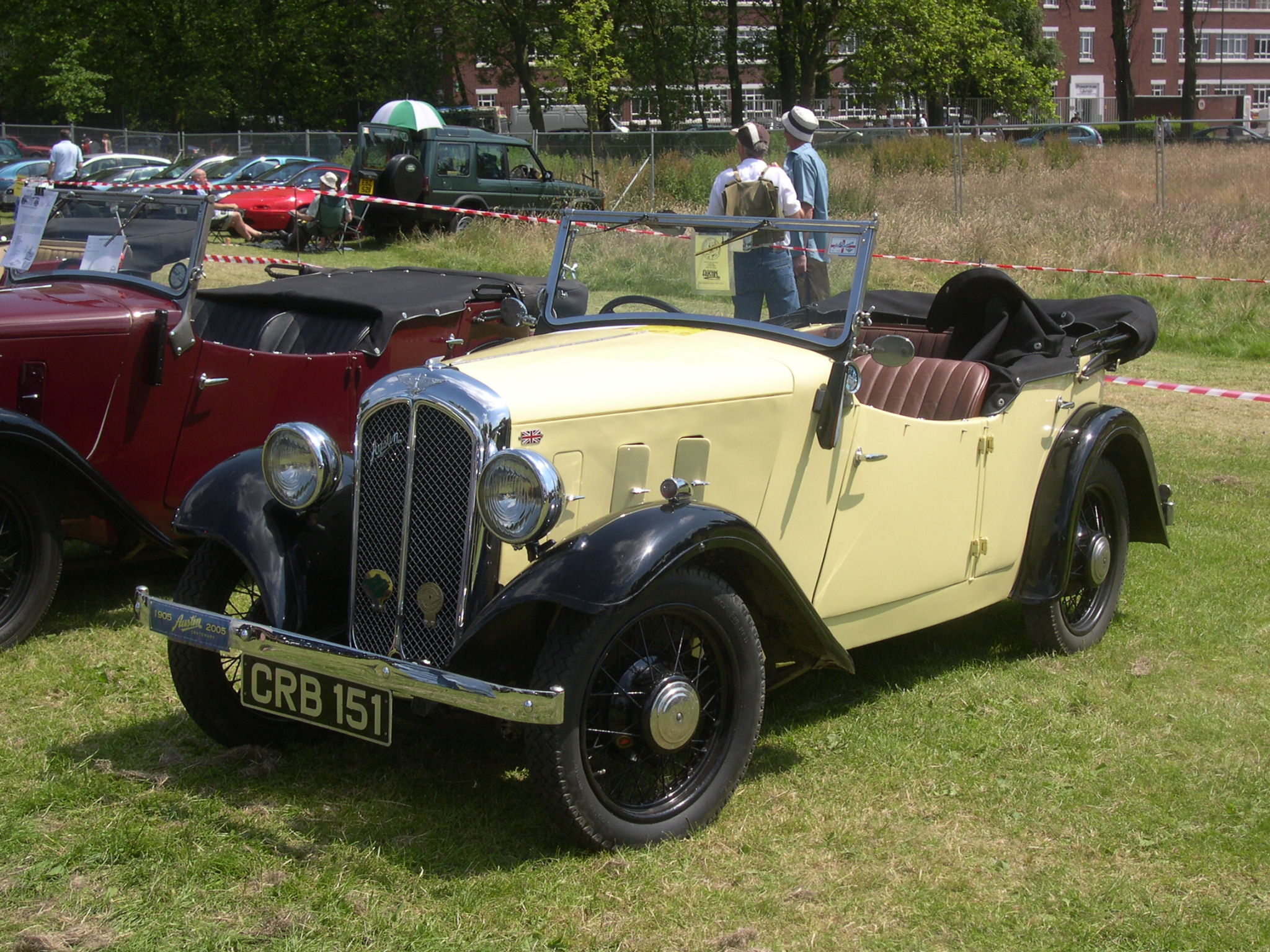
Ripley sports tourer, 1934

The Ripley was a close-coupled four-door tourer with lowered front doors and no running boards. Improved engine breathing—Zenith downdraught carburettor, revised manifolds and camshaft—all combined to improve engine output to 30 bhp.

Austin's range now included five "sports cars":

- Seven open two-seaters: Speedy and Nippy
- Ten-Four sports tourer: Ripley
- Light Twelve-Six sports tourer: Newbury and sports saloon Kempton

== Facelift for 1935 ==
The first styling change came in August 1934 with a change to the radiator when the plated surround or cowl was replaced by one painted in body colour and it was given a slight slope. Synchromesh was added to second gear and dual screenwipers, flush-fitting self-cancelling trafficators (worked by the steering) and a foot-operated headlamp dip switch were fitted. The engine controls were simplified by the adoption of automatic ignition, compensated voltage control, and the provision of a "choke" (combined strangler and throttle control). The saloon was given the name Lichfield and got a protruding boot which enclosed the spare wheel. During 1935 the friction dampers were replaced with hydraulic dampers.

| 1936 | Lichfield saloon | Colwyn cabriolet | Open Road tourer | Clifton two-seater | Ripley sports tourer |
|---|---|---|---|---|---|
| length | 139 in (3,531 mm) | | | 141 in (3,581 mm) | 138.5 in (3,518 mm) |
| width | 55 in (1,397 mm) | | | | 54.5 in (1,384 mm) |
| height | 64 in (1,626 mm) | | 65 in (1,651 mm) | | 62 in (1,575 mm) |

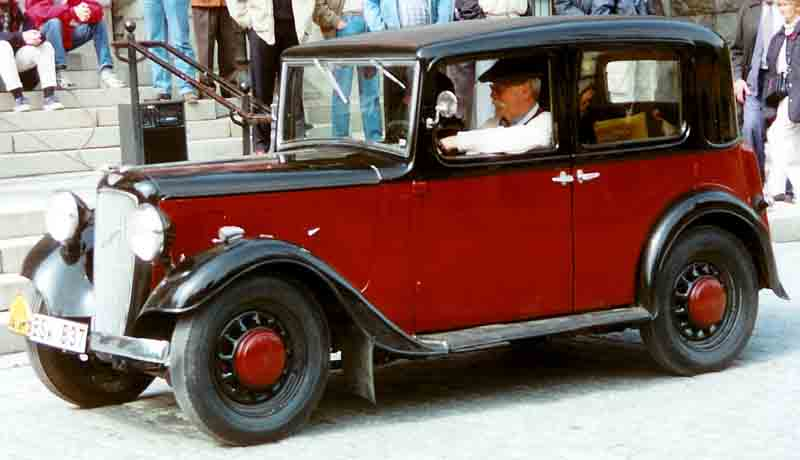
Lichfield 4-Door Saloon 1935

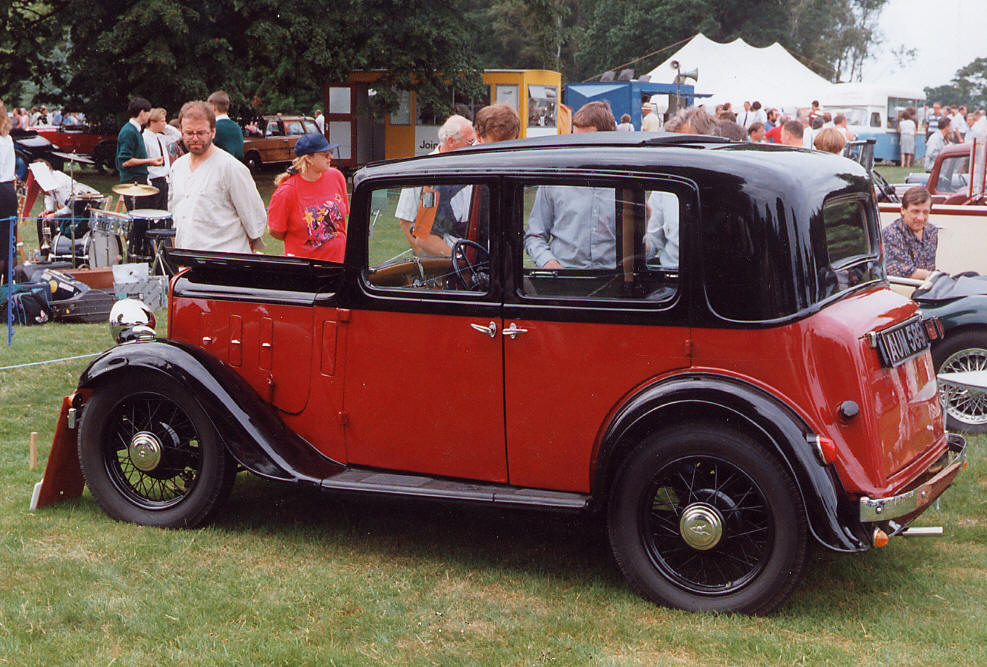
Lichfield saloon showing new boot

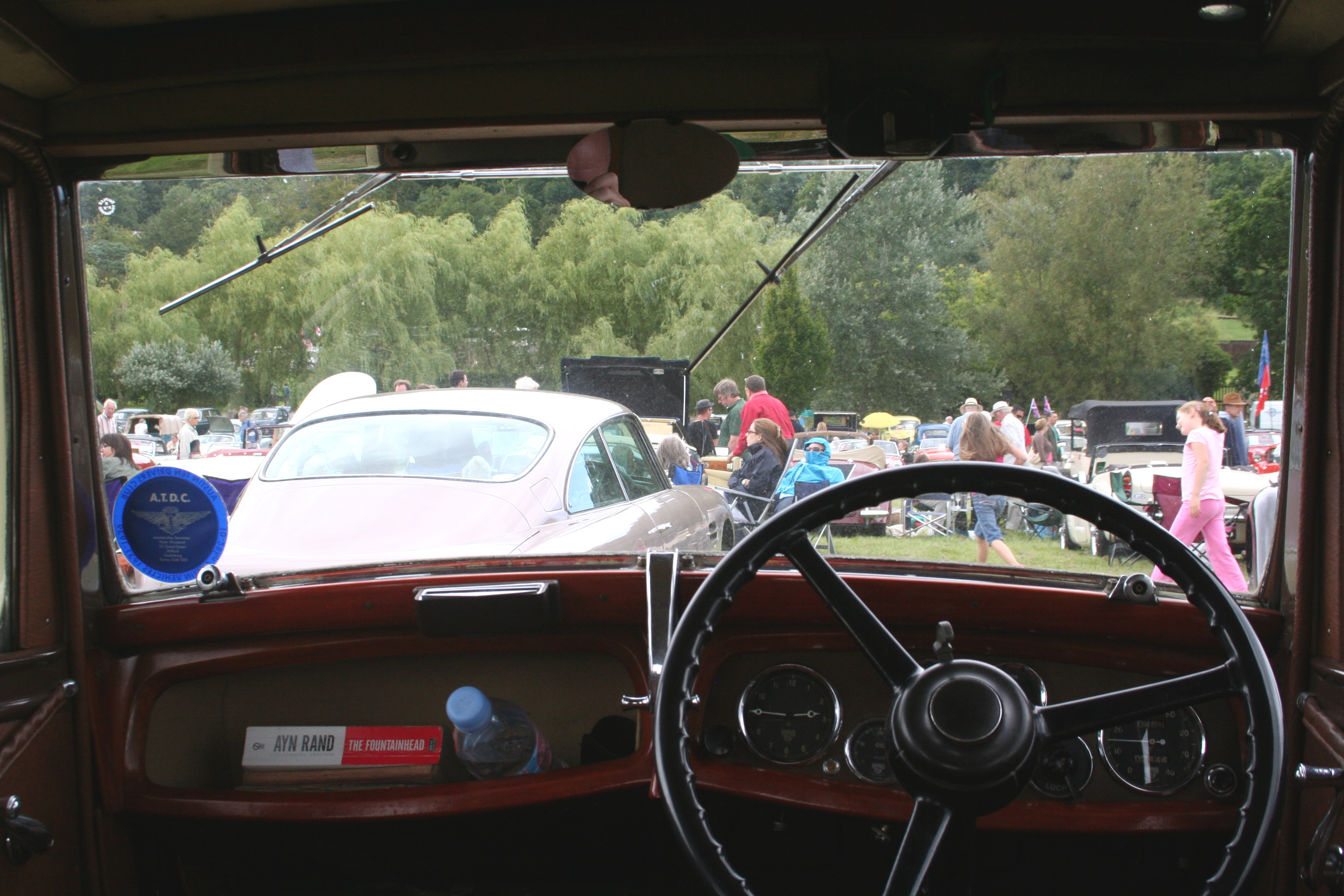
Lichfield interior

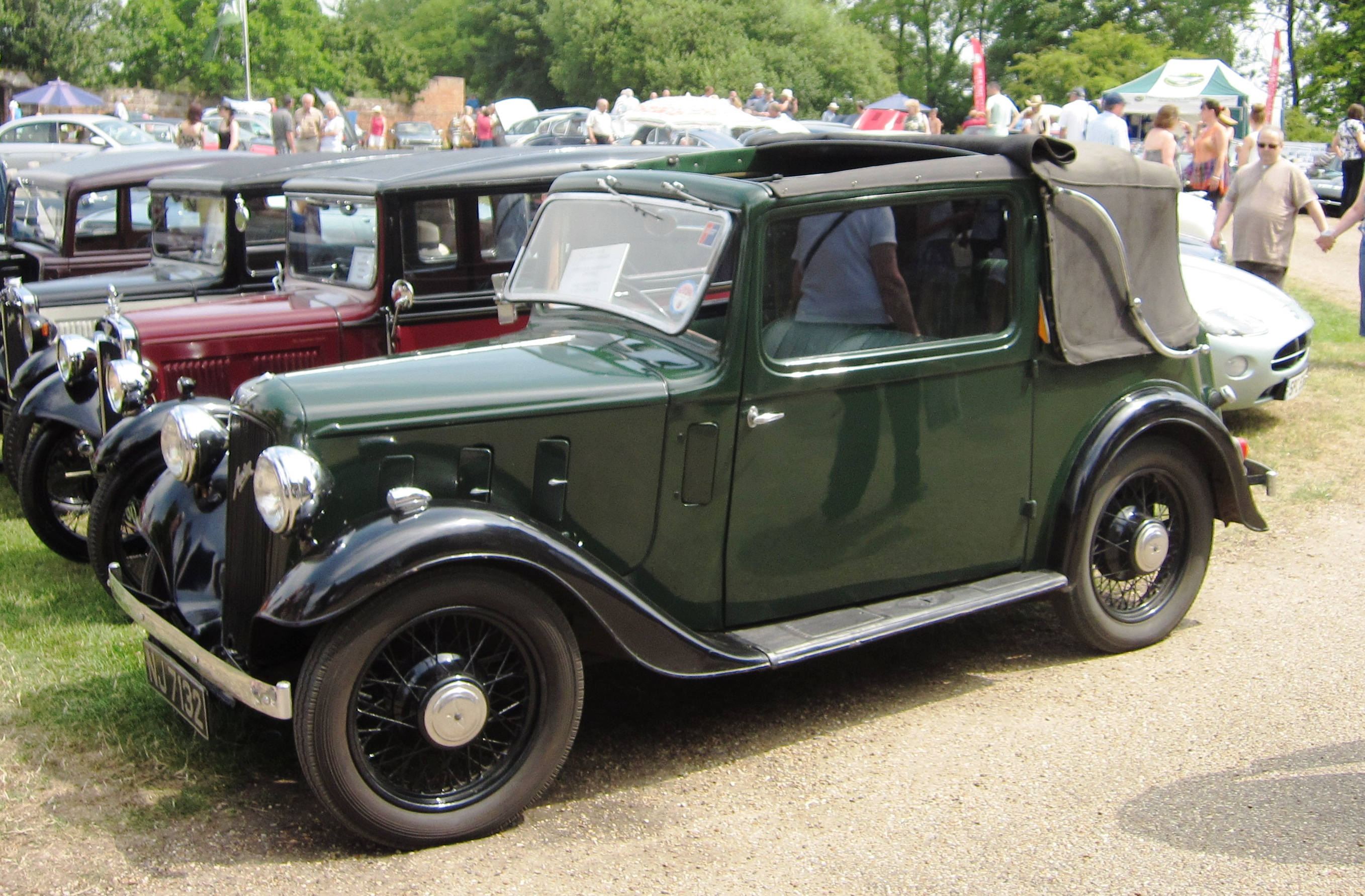
Colwyn cabriolet 1935

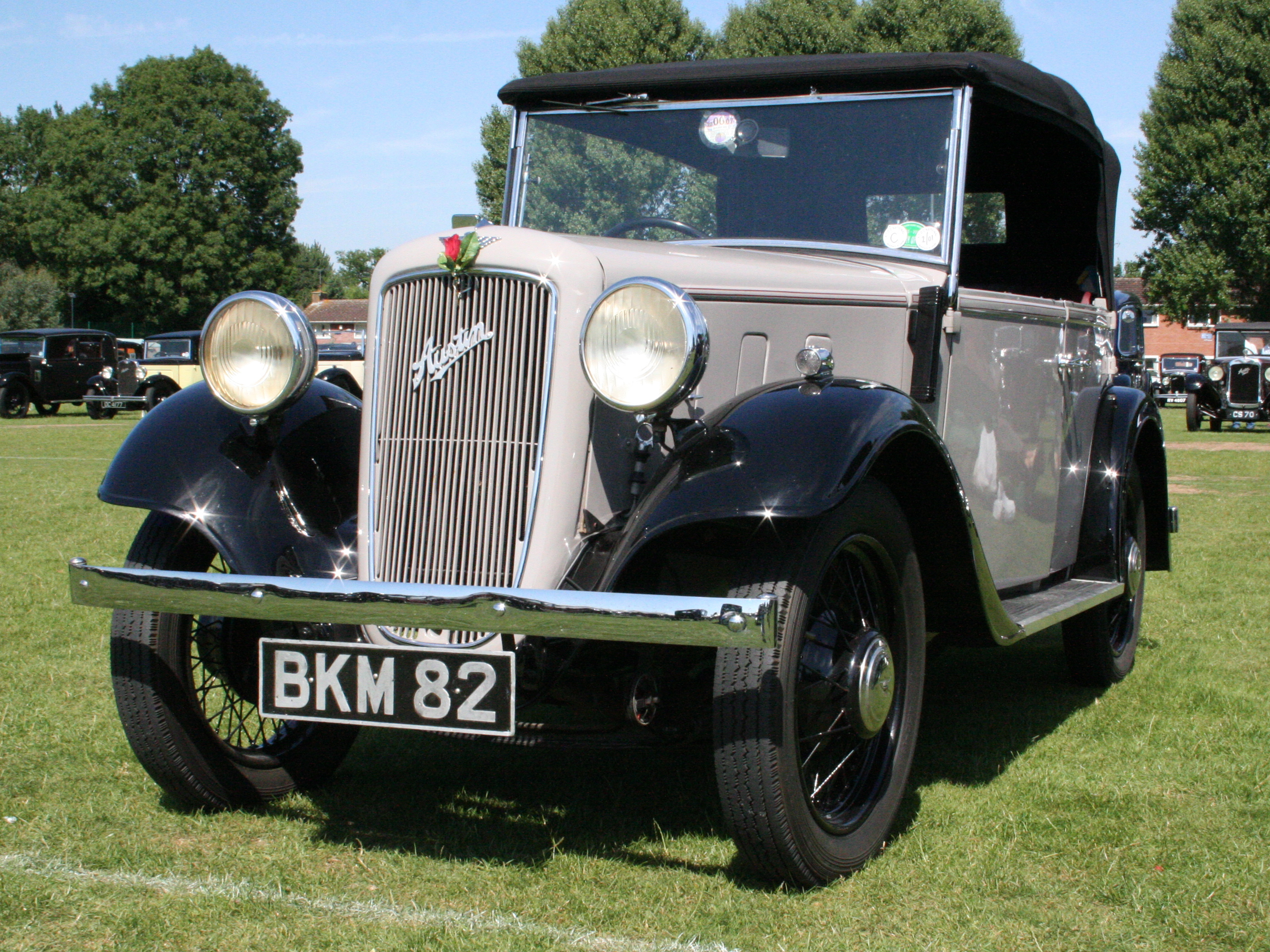
Open Road tourer 1934

== Six-light Sherborne ==
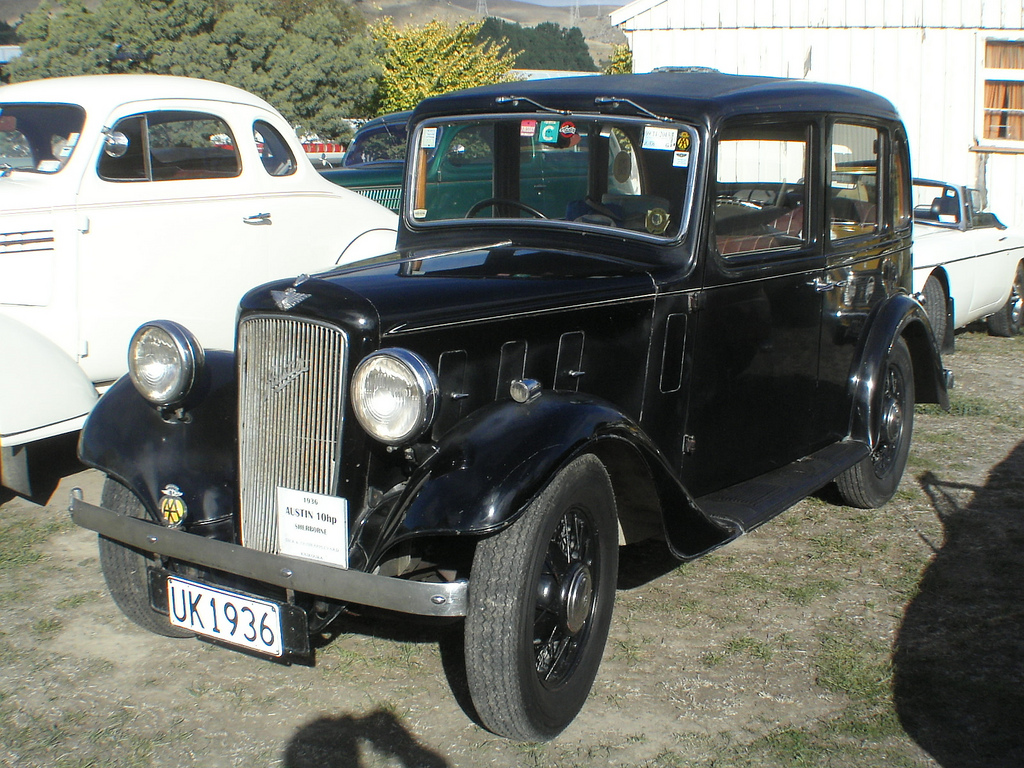
Austin front

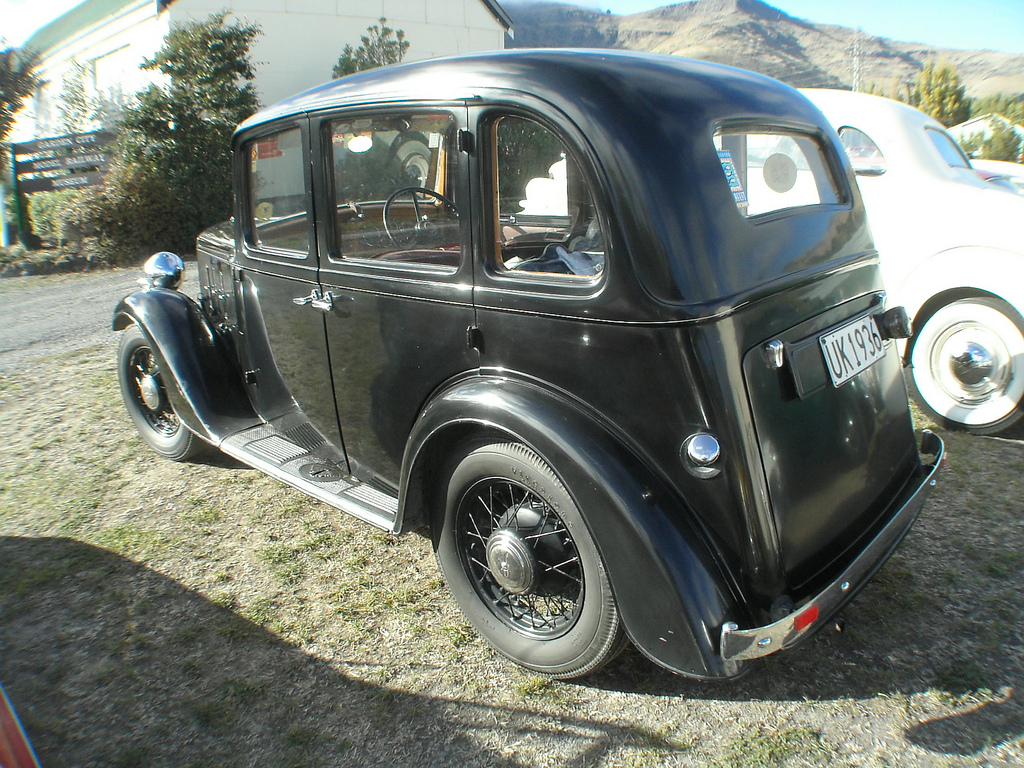
'Airline' back

A new six light (three windows down each side, with one behind the rear door) Sherborne body style was added in January 1936, the roof line swept to the rear without interruption to provide a flush back, the then fashionable 'Airline' style. The new seating was extra deep at the rear, now with armrests and somewhat longer from back to front than on previous models. The new Sherborne with fixed or sliding roof was priced at £10 more than the equivalent Lichfield.

The forward doors opened rearwards which was considered safer, steering was now by worm and sector with an hour-glass worm. The road-tester described the engine in The Times as having "a steady plodding nature'" and advised that its trustworthiness and simplicity made up for any lack of refinement. The weight of this car was quoted as 17 cwt 1,904 lb (864 kg) as compared with the Lichfield's 15½ cwt, 1,736 lb (787 kg)

== New body for 1937 ==
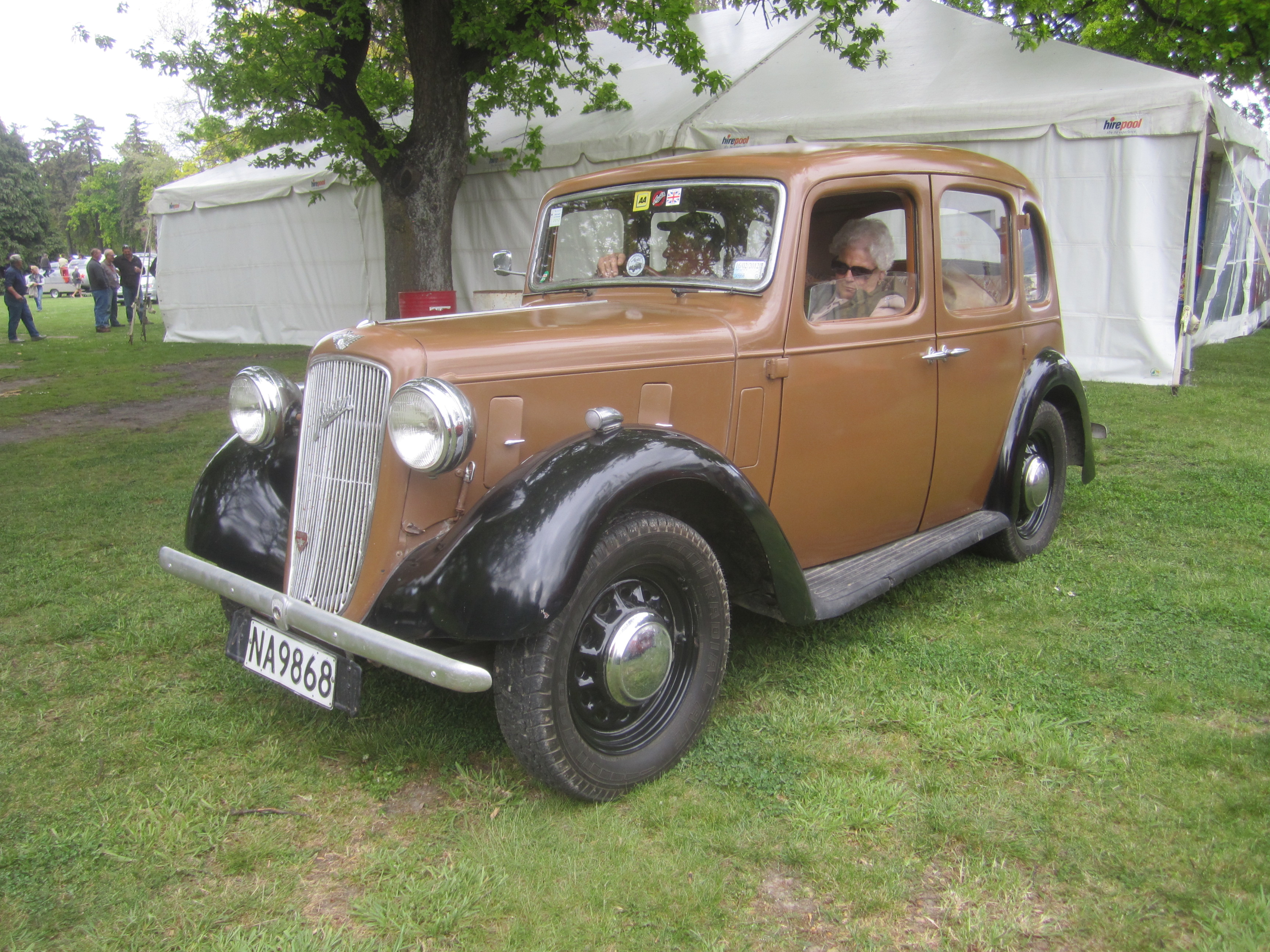
Cambridge 4-Door saloon 1938

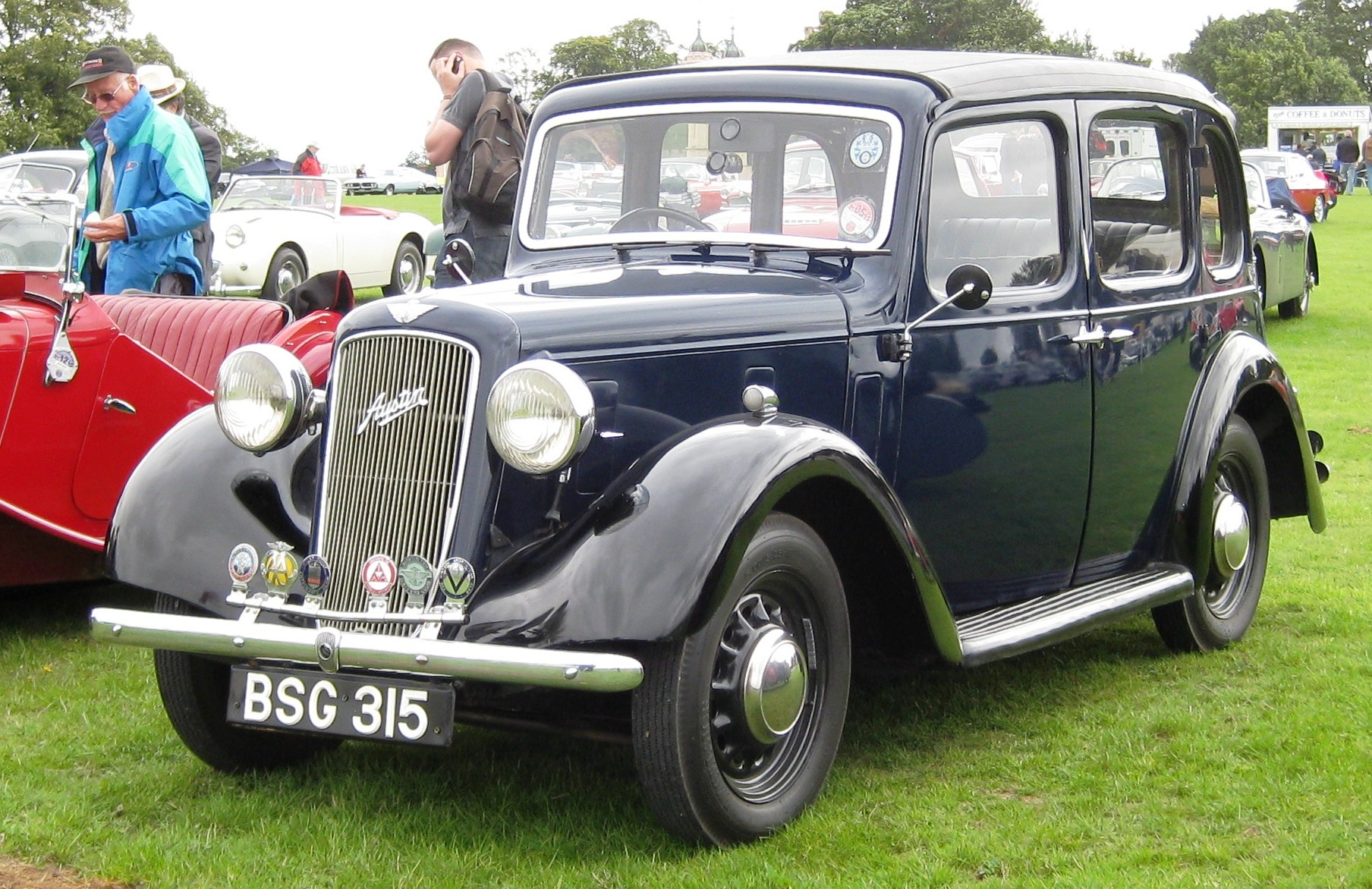
Conway 4-door cabriolet 1938

A big change came in December 1936 with the almost streamlined Cambridge saloon and Conway cabriolet. Compared with the preceding cars the passengers and engine were positioned much further forward, the back seat now being rather forward of the back axle. There were six side windows like the Sherborne and the quarter lights were fixed. Again like the Sherborne the forward doors opened rearwards. At the back there was now a compartment large enough to take a trunk as well as more luggage on the open compartment door when it was let down.

A new smoother single plate spring-drive clutch was now fitted, the two friction rings carried by the centre plate were held apart by leaf springs. Other changes included Girling brakes with wedge and roller shoe expansion and balance lever compensation using operating rods in tension with automatic compensation between front and rear brakes all four of which might be applied by hand or foot. Drums were now 9 inches in diameter. 16-inch steel disc wheels replaced the 18-inch wires, while top speed rose to 60 miles per hour (97 km/h).

The car's wheelbase was now 3/4 inch (19 mm) longer, rear track increased to 3 feet 10 1/2 inches (1,181 mm). The vehicle's weight was now reported to be 18 1/2 long cwt (2,072 lb; 940 kg)

The Times, when they had a car on test, commented favourably on the new clutch, saying no previous Austin clutch had engaged smoothly and added "the car is built for steady economical running rather than for speed or brilliance".

These changes did not appear on the open cars, which no longer included the Ripley sports, until 1938 when the Cambridge and the Conway cabriolet gained an aluminium cylinder head on the engine and a higher compression ratio.

== Semi-unitary construction for 1940 ==
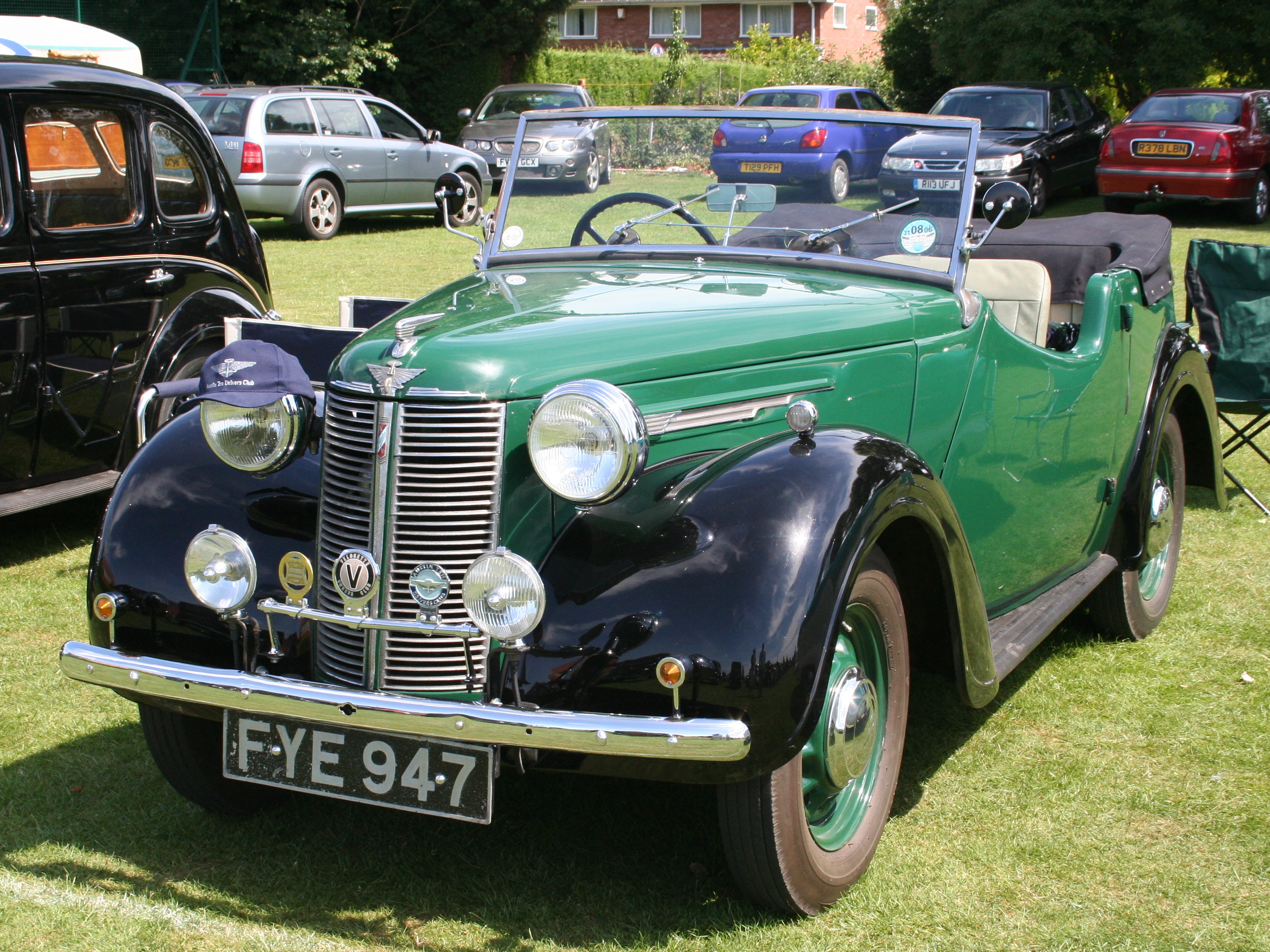
tourer late 1939 with alligator bonnet

A virtually new car was launched in May 1939 with the body shell incorporating the floor to give a semi-unitary structure. The car was completely restyled by Argentine born Dick Burzi who had joined Austin from Lancia in 1929. The bonnet was hinged at the rear, replacing the side-opening type on the old car and the radiator grille became rounded and there was no cabriolet. It was now available as four-door saloon with fixed or sliding head or as a sporting type four-seated tourer.

The new chassis consisted of a platform braced with box members bounded by reversed U channelling the full length of each side. The body was then bolted, not welded, alternately to the top and bottom of that channelling. The forward end was strengthened by diagonal bracing and the centre given extra strength by the tunnel over the transmission. Windows were of toughened glass. The cylinder head was now aluminium for high compression and output now 32 bhp at 4,000 rpm. Shock absorbers were now hydraulic and of the double acting piston type. Bumpers were now given over-riders, lighting was 12-volt.

New dimensions: track front and rear: 3' 11", 47 in (1,200 mm) and 4' 0", 48 in (1,200 mm)
Overall height length and width were: 5' 4", 64 in (1,600 mm), 13' 2", 158 in (4,000 mm), and 4' 10½", 58.5 in (1,490 mm),

== War ==
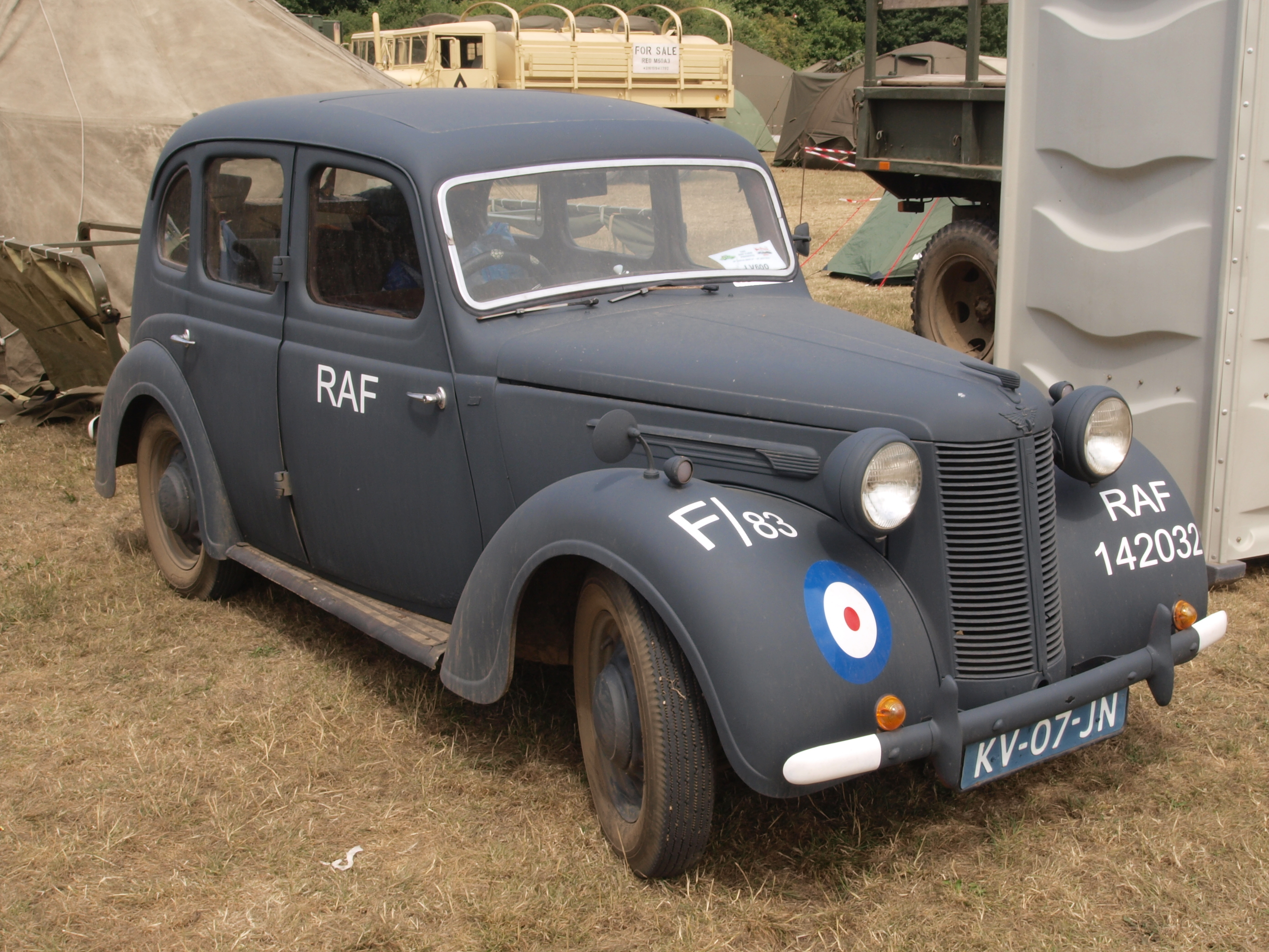
RAF 1944

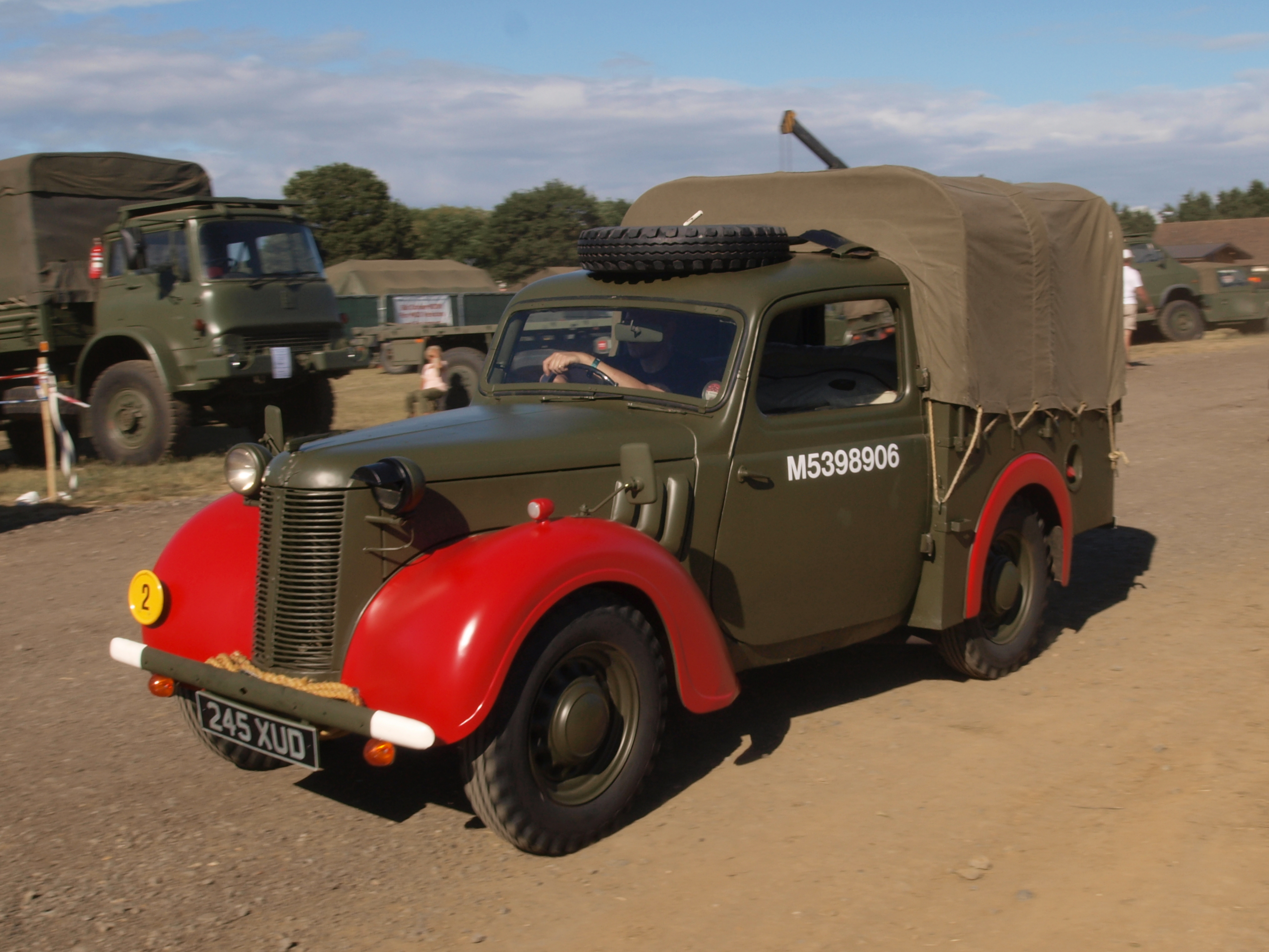
Tilly

Despite the outbreak of World War II, production of the Ten continued in large numbers; there were no tourers but there was a pick-up. In all during the war, 53,000 of the saloons and utilities—pick-ups and vans—the last two unofficially known as "Tillys", were made.

== Postwar ==
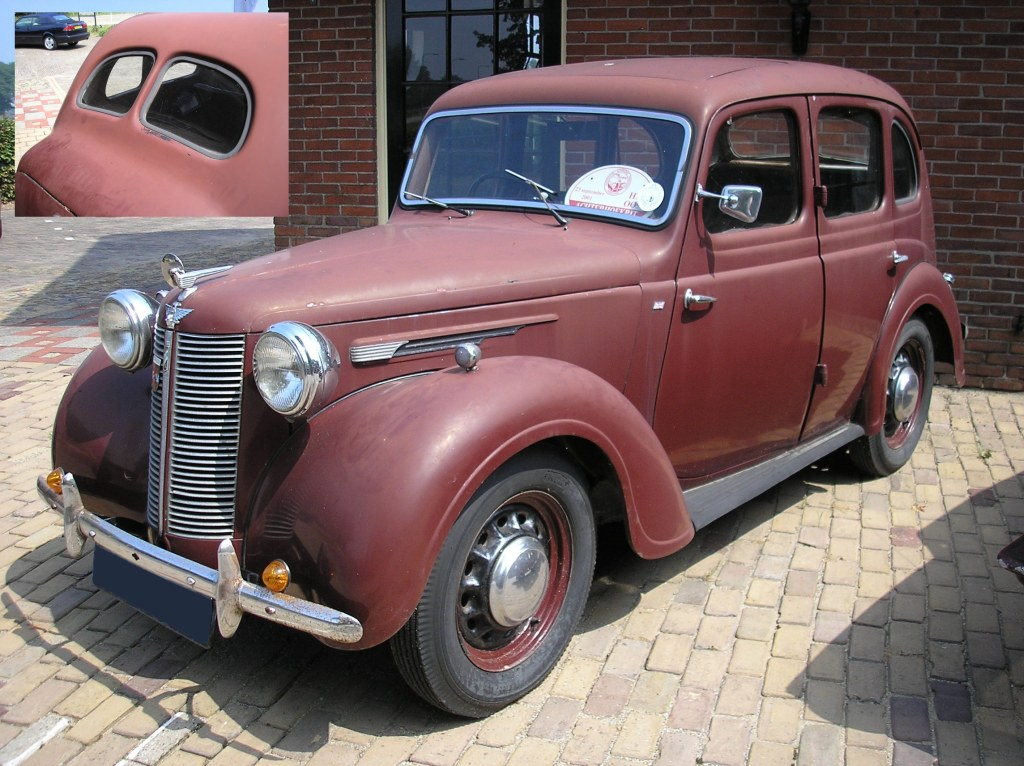
Ten GS 1 saloon 1946 delivered in the Netherlands

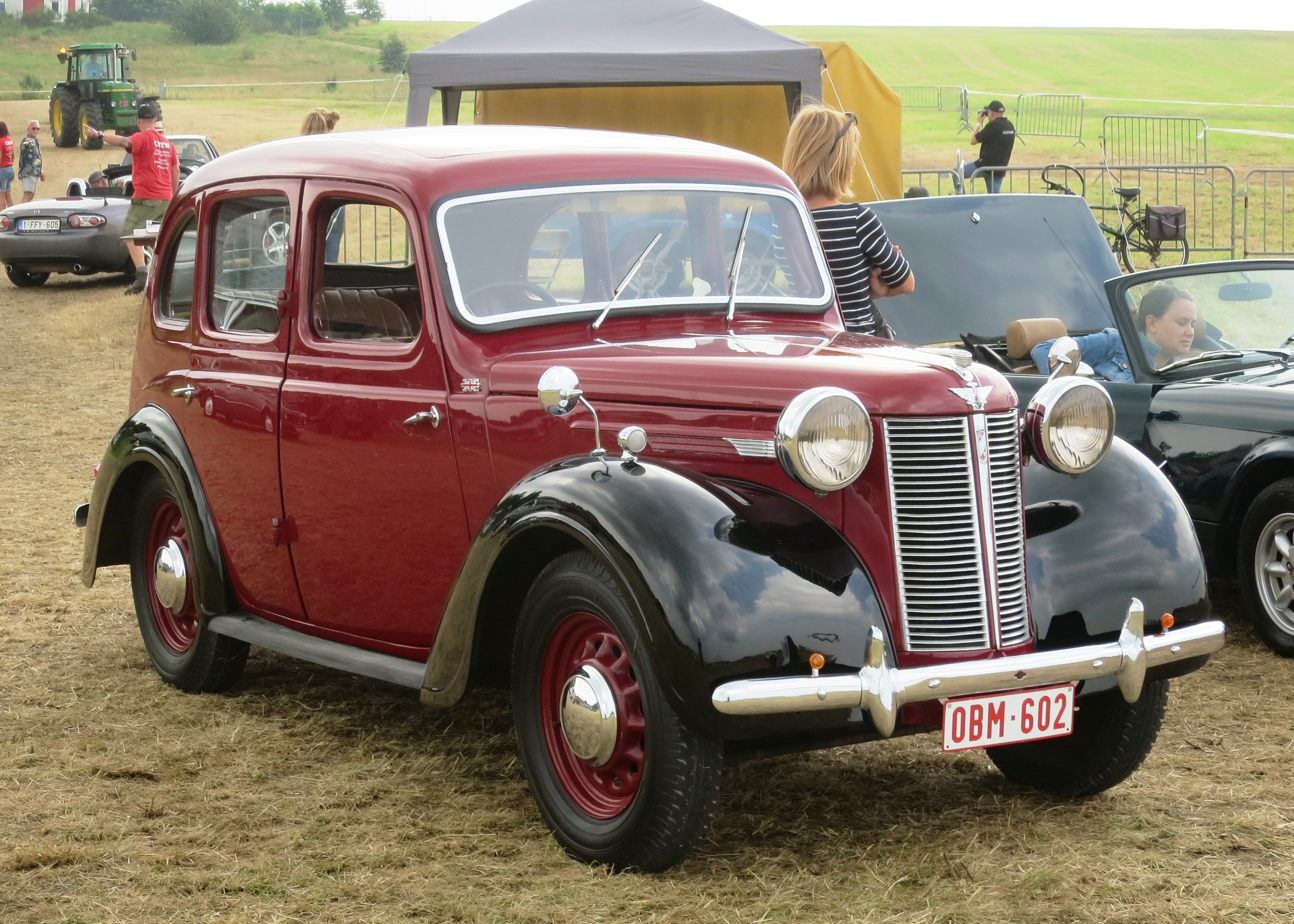
Post-war Ten

With peace in 1945 a change was immediately made to civilian production but because of the post-war financial crisis the cars were nearly all exported, with the first one arriving in the United States in July 1945. In September 1945 the first passenger cars produced after World War II's end to arrive in Switzerland were two Austin Tens exported from England.

The car continued in production in saloon form only until October 1947 to be replaced by the A40. The van also re-appeared post-war with a slightly larger 1237-cc engine.

== Military operators ==
- British Army, Royal Navy, RAF
