= Saitama Stadium 2002 =

Football stadium in Saitama, Japan

Coordinates: 35°54′11″N 139°43′03″E

- 埼玉スタジアム2002
- Saisuta
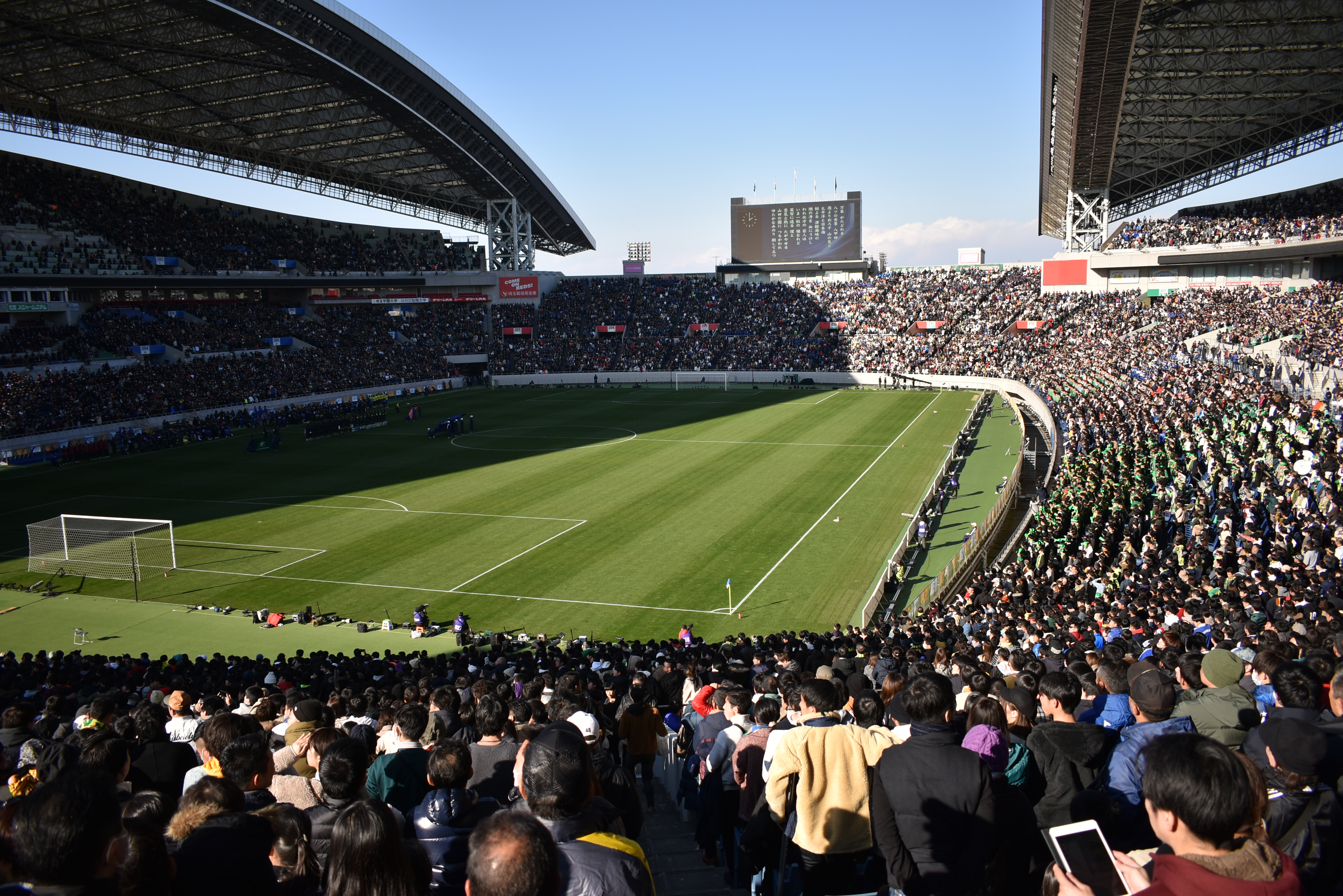
- Interactive map of Saitama Stadium 2002
- Full name: Saitama Stadium 2002
- Location: Midori-ku, Saitama, Saitama Prefecture, Japan
- Owner: Saitama Prefecture
- Operator: Saitama Prefectural Park Association
- Capacity: 63,700
- Surface: Grass
- Record attendance: 63,551 (Japan vs Oman, 3 June 2012)
- Field size: 105 x 68 m
- Public transit: Saitama Rapid Railway Line at Urawa-Misono

Construction
- Opened: 1 October 2001

Tenants
- Urawa Red Diamonds (2001–present); Japan national football team (select matches): Major sporting events hosted; 2002 FIFA World Cup; 2020 Summer Olympics football; AFC Champions League

Saitama Stadium 2002 (埼玉スタジアム2002, Saitama Sutajiamu Nimarumaruni), a.k.a. the Saitama Stadium (埼玉スタジアム, Saitama Sutajiamu) or simply Saisuta (埼スタ), is a football stadium located in Midori-ku, Saitama, Japan.

Currently, J1 League club Urawa Red Diamonds use this stadium for home games. It is the largest football-specific stadium in Japan and is one of the largest stadiums in Asia. It has hosted the semi-finals of both the 2002 FIFA World Cup and the football tournament at the 2020 Summer Olympics. It is also the home stadium of Japan national football team in almost every FIFA World Cup qualifying matches.

== History ==
Built by Azusa Sekkei to host matches of the 2002 FIFA World Cup, construction was completed in September 2001. The stadium holds 63,700 people, although for segregation reasons league games hosted at the ground have a reduced capacity of 62,300. The Saitama Stadium hosted four matches during the 2002 FIFA World Cup, including co-host Japan's first match against Belgium.

Between 2005 and 2007, the Urawa Red Diamonds' local derby rival Omiya Ardija hosted matches here along with Urawa Komaba due to expansion of its home Ōmiya Park Soccer Stadium.The stadium was also featured in the remastered version of the anime Captain Tsubasa where in the middle school tournament the stadium was mostly shown as the main stadium.

== Transport issues ==
The ease of access of the stadium has been a problem known to the prefectural government, academics and the home team for years, mostly concerning the congested road traffic and the fact that it is 20-minute walk from the nearest station, Urawa-Misono. From Tokyo station, the stadium is 45 minutes by train plus 1.2 km walking on foot, or 40 minutes drive.

A survey in 2017 found that on an international matchday, with typically 60,000 attendance, 60.5% (36,000) arrived by railway, 25.2% (15,000) drove cars, 8.7% (5,200) took intra-prefecture shuttle bus, and 3,300 (5.6%) arrived by bicycle, motorbikes or on foot. On a J. League club match typically with 40,000 attendance, railway usage dropped sharply to 40.6% while usage of all other modes of transport increased.

The road congestion caught international attention in the 2026 FIFA World Cup qualifiers, scheduled to kick-off at 19:35, October 15, 2024. Australia, staying in the five-star Hotel Chinzanso Tokyo in downtown Bunkyō, Tokyo, took 2 hours 9 minutes (16:37-18:46) in their chartered coach to arrive the stadium. Ordinary driving time from Tokyo Station is estimated to be 40 minutes, according to the stadium.

== FIFA World Cup ==
The stadium was one of the venues of the 2002 FIFA World Cup, and held the following matches:

Date	Time (JST)	Team 1	Result	Team 2	Round	Attendance
2 June 2002	18:30	England	1–1	Sweden	Group F	52,721
4 June 2002	18:00	Japan	2–2	Belgium	Group H	55,256
6 June 2002	18:00	Cameroon	1–0	Saudi Arabia	Group E	52,328
26 June 2002	20:30	Brazil	1–0	Turkey	Semi-finals	61,058

== Olympic Games ==
Men's tournament
Date	Time (JST)	Team 1	Result	Team 2	Round	Attendance
25 July 2021	17.00	France	4–3	South Africa	Group A	0
25 July 2021	20.00	Japan	2–1	Mexico	Group A	0
28 July 2021	20.00	Spain	1–1	Argentina	Group C	0
28 July 2021	17.00	Saudi Arabia	1–3	Brazil	Group D	0
31 July 2021	19.00	Brazil	1–0	Egypt	Quarter-finals	0
3 August 2021	20.00	Japan	0–1	Spain	Semi-finals	0
6 August 2021	18.00	Mexico	3–1	Japan	Bronze-medal match	0

Women's tournament
Date	Time (JST)	Team 1	Result	Team 2	Round	Attendance
24 July 2021	17.30	Sweden	4–2	Australia	Group G	0
24 July 2021	12.30	New Zealand	1–6	United States	Group G	0
30 July 2021	12.30	Sweden	3–1	Japan	Quarter-finals	0

== Structural design ==
- Building area: 54,420 m^{2}
- Total floor area: 62,674 m^{2}
- Covered area: 29,000 m^{2}
- Stand inclination: Max. 30 degree angle

== Gallery ==
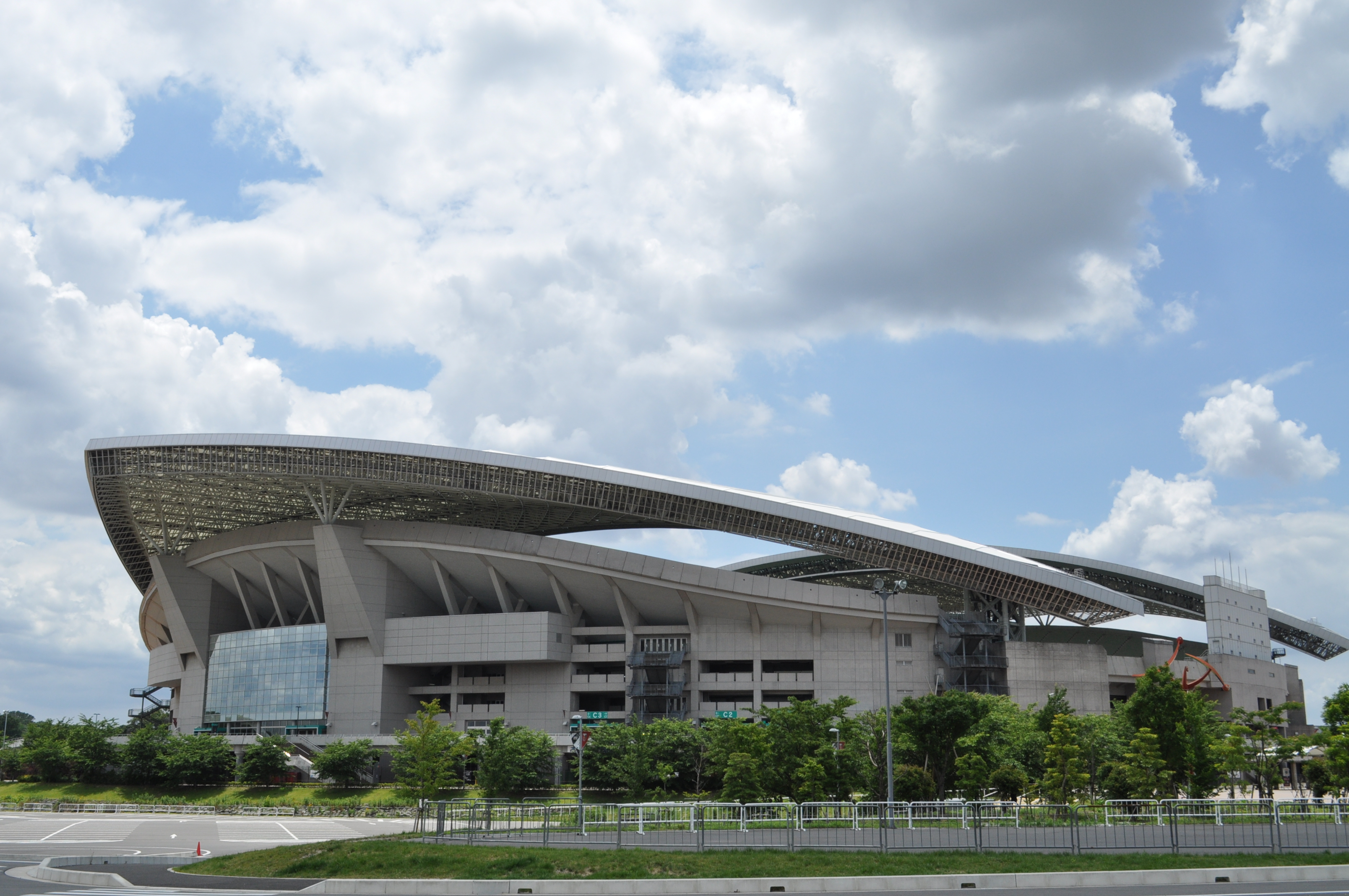
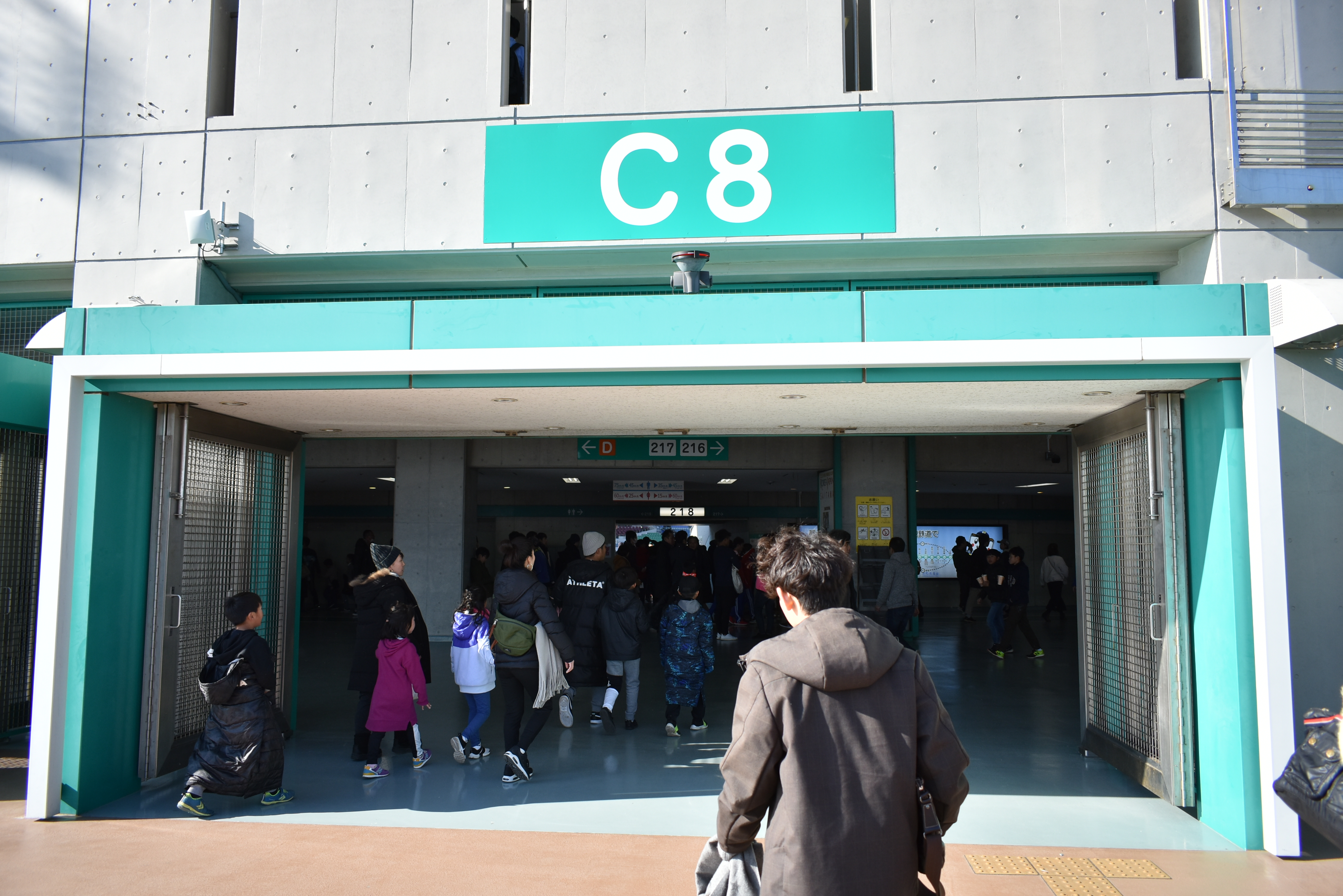
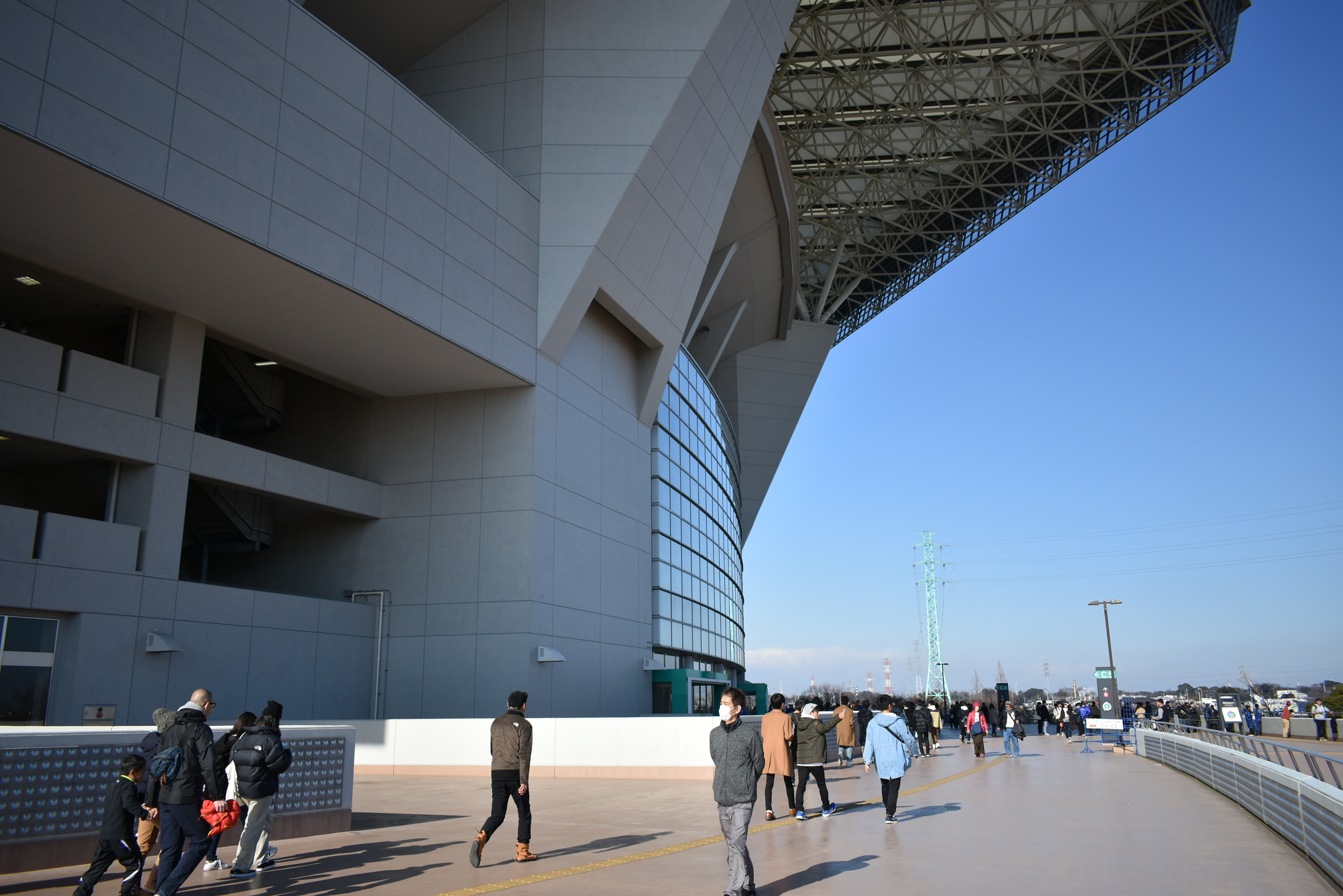
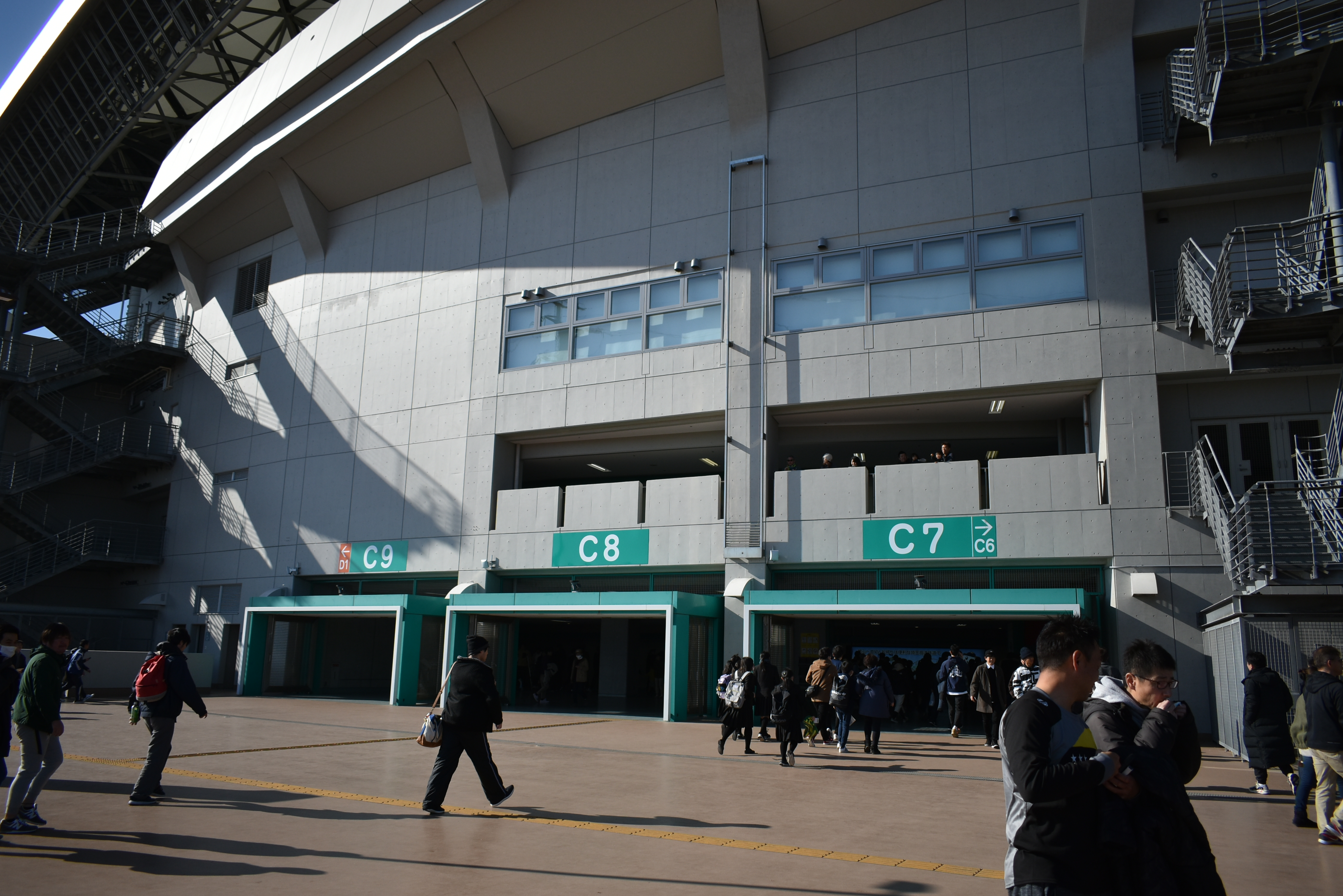
Stadium exterior
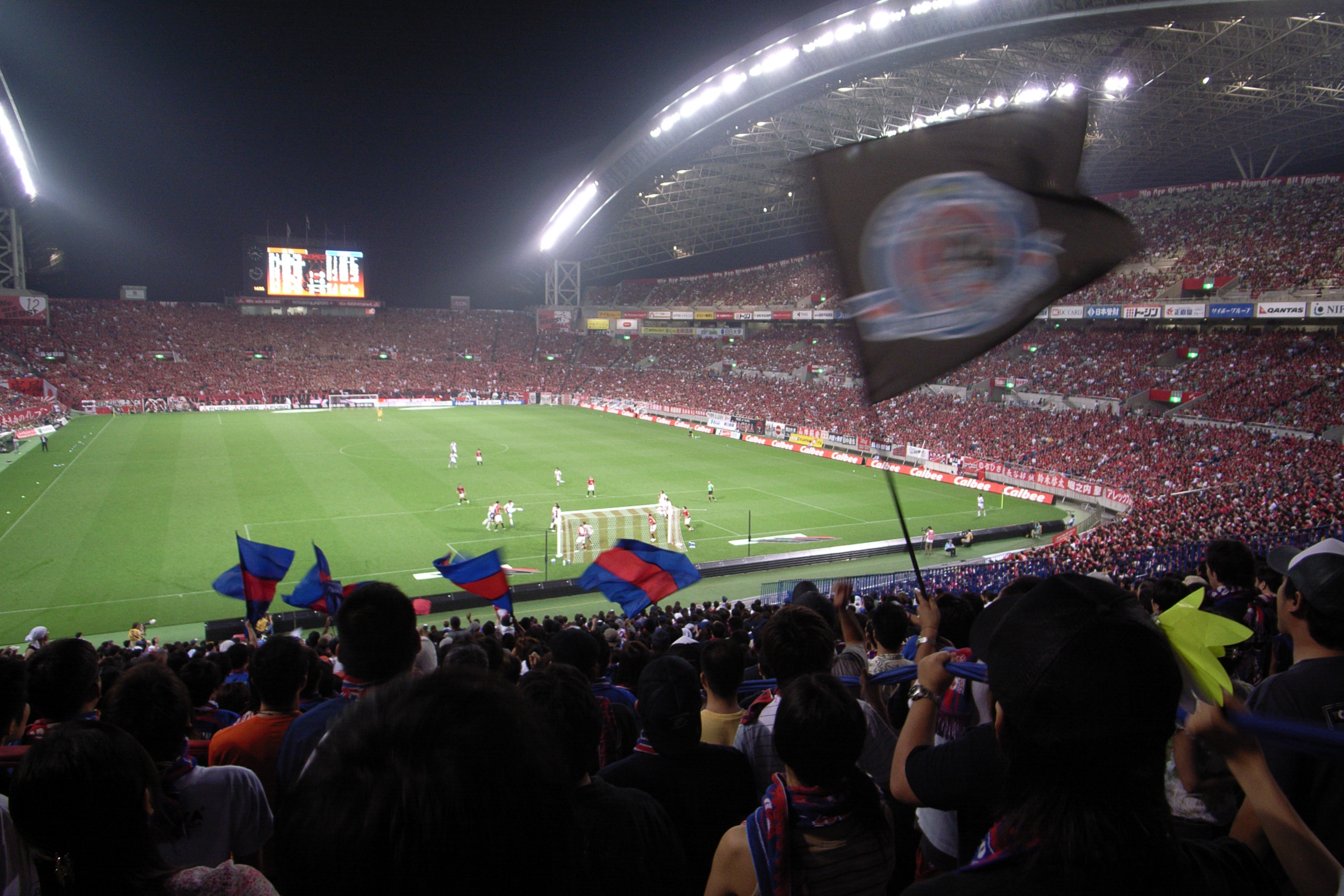

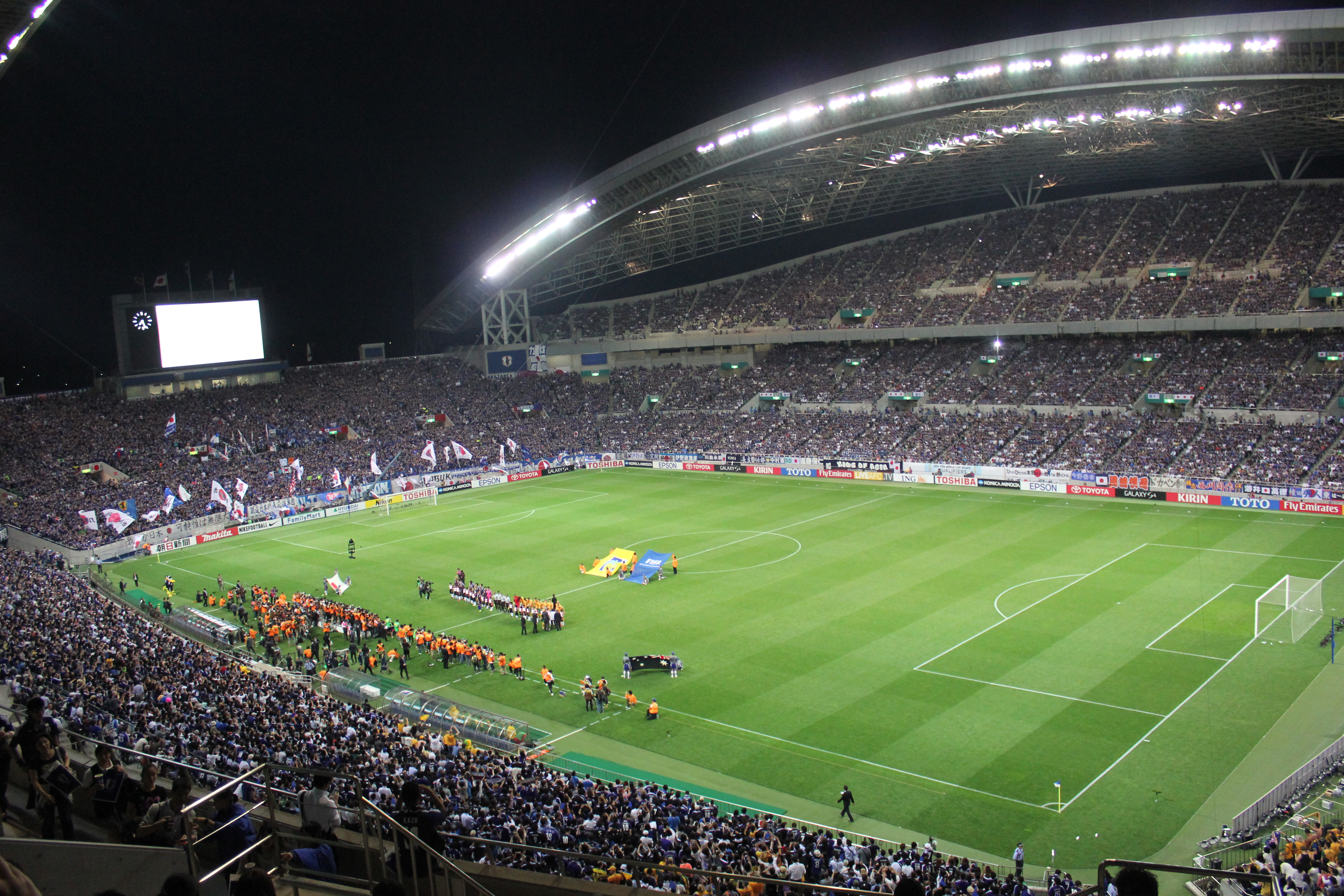
Japan vs Australia in 2014 FIFA World Cup qualification – AFC fourth round.

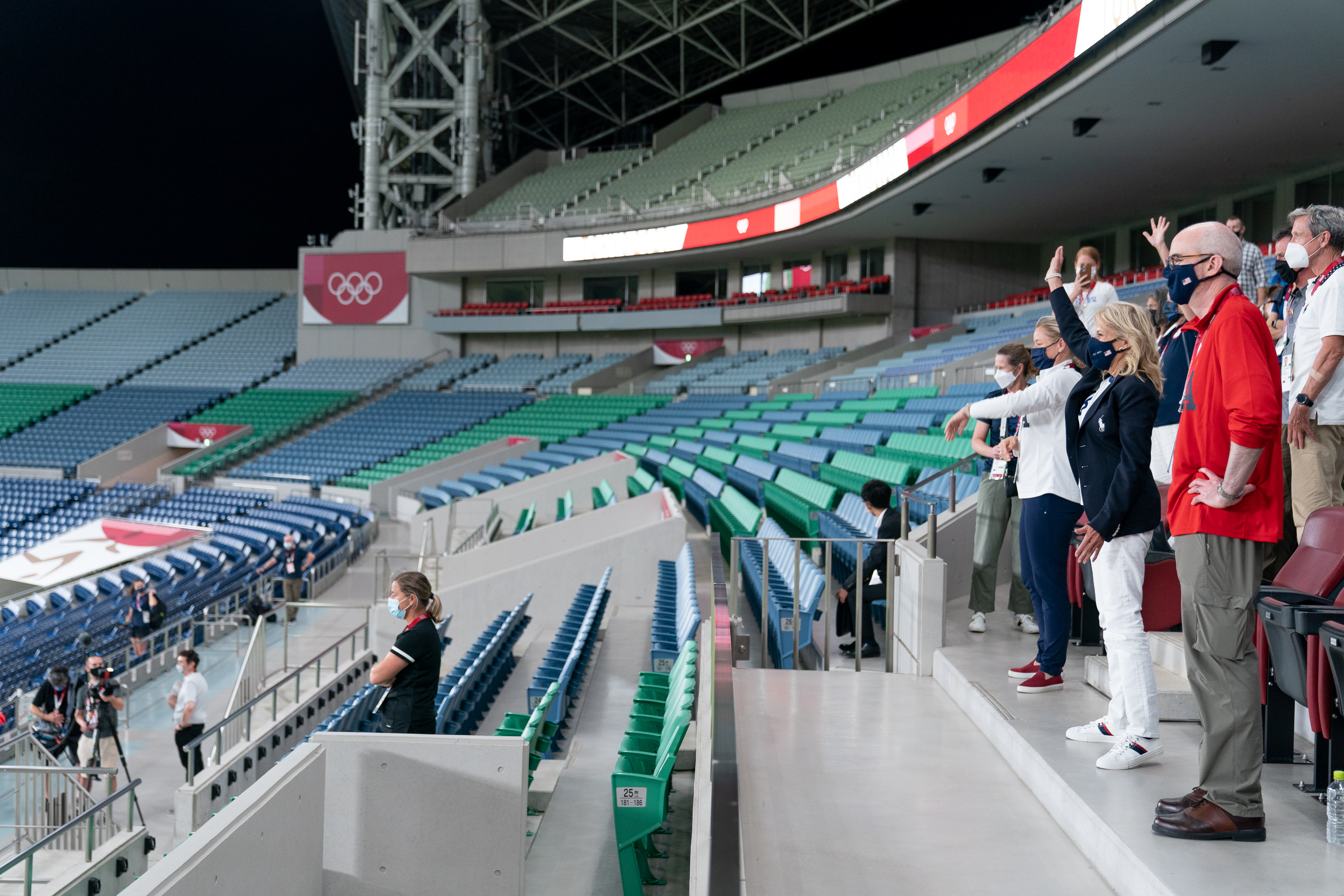
2020 Summer Olympics

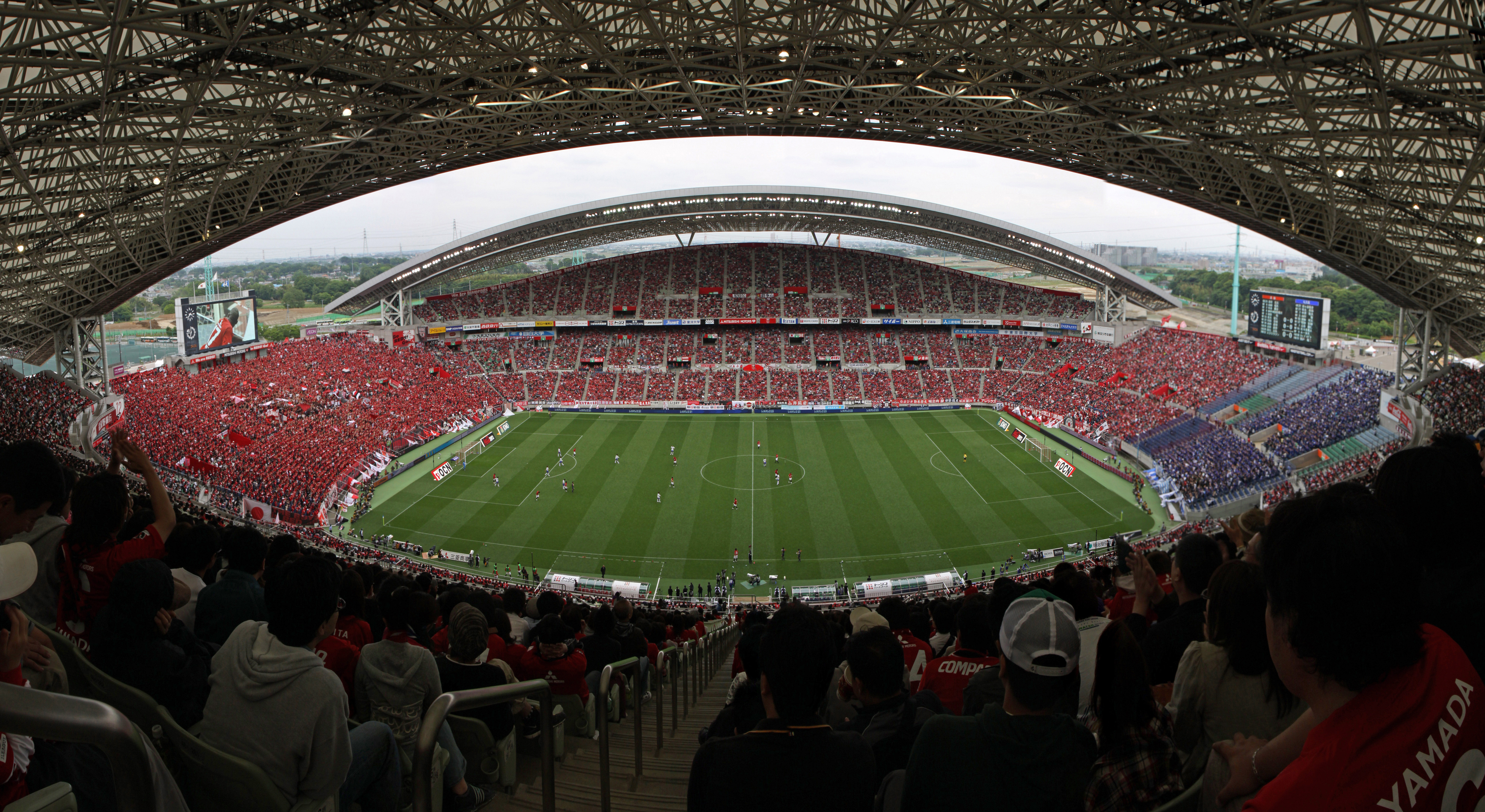
Panorama

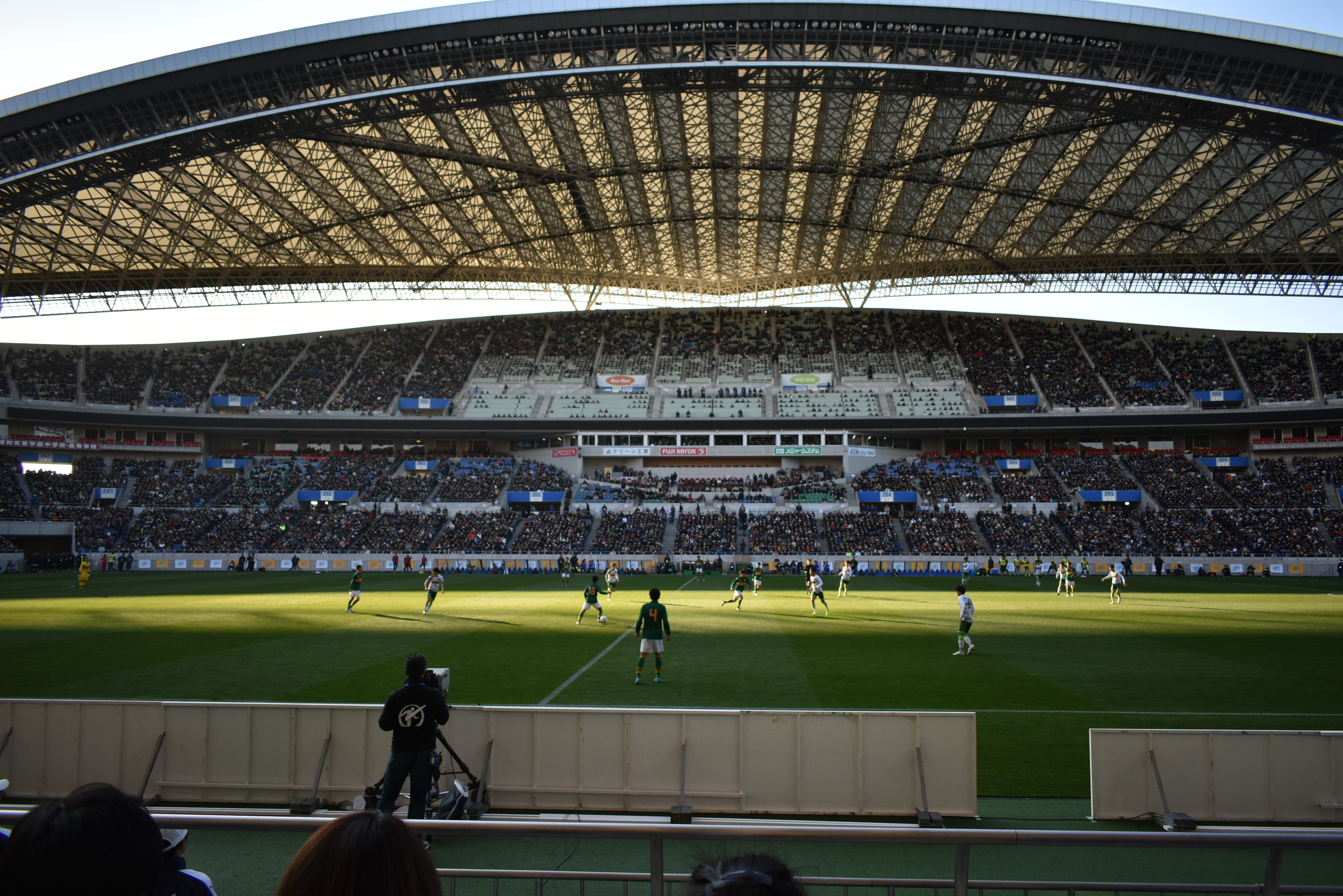
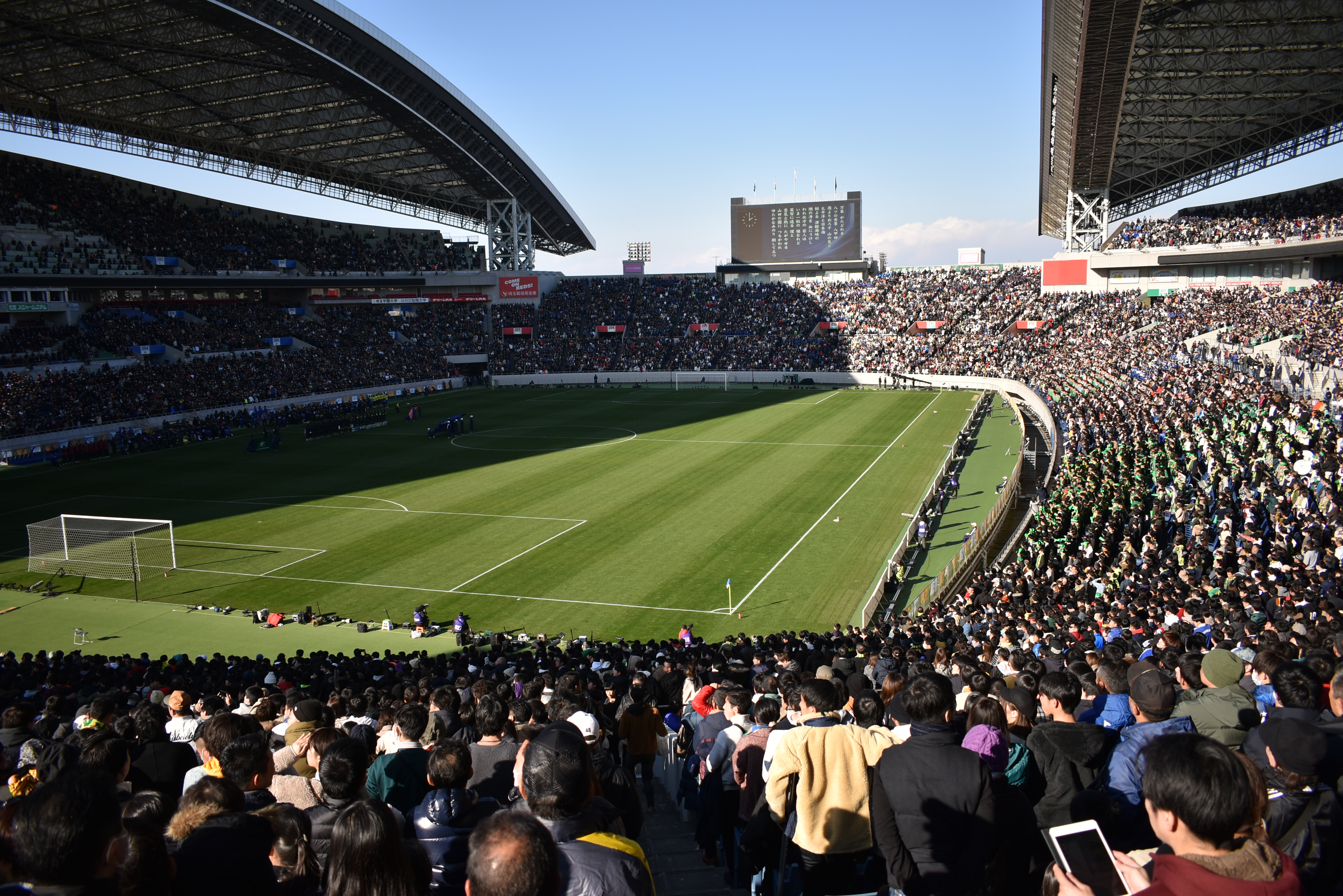
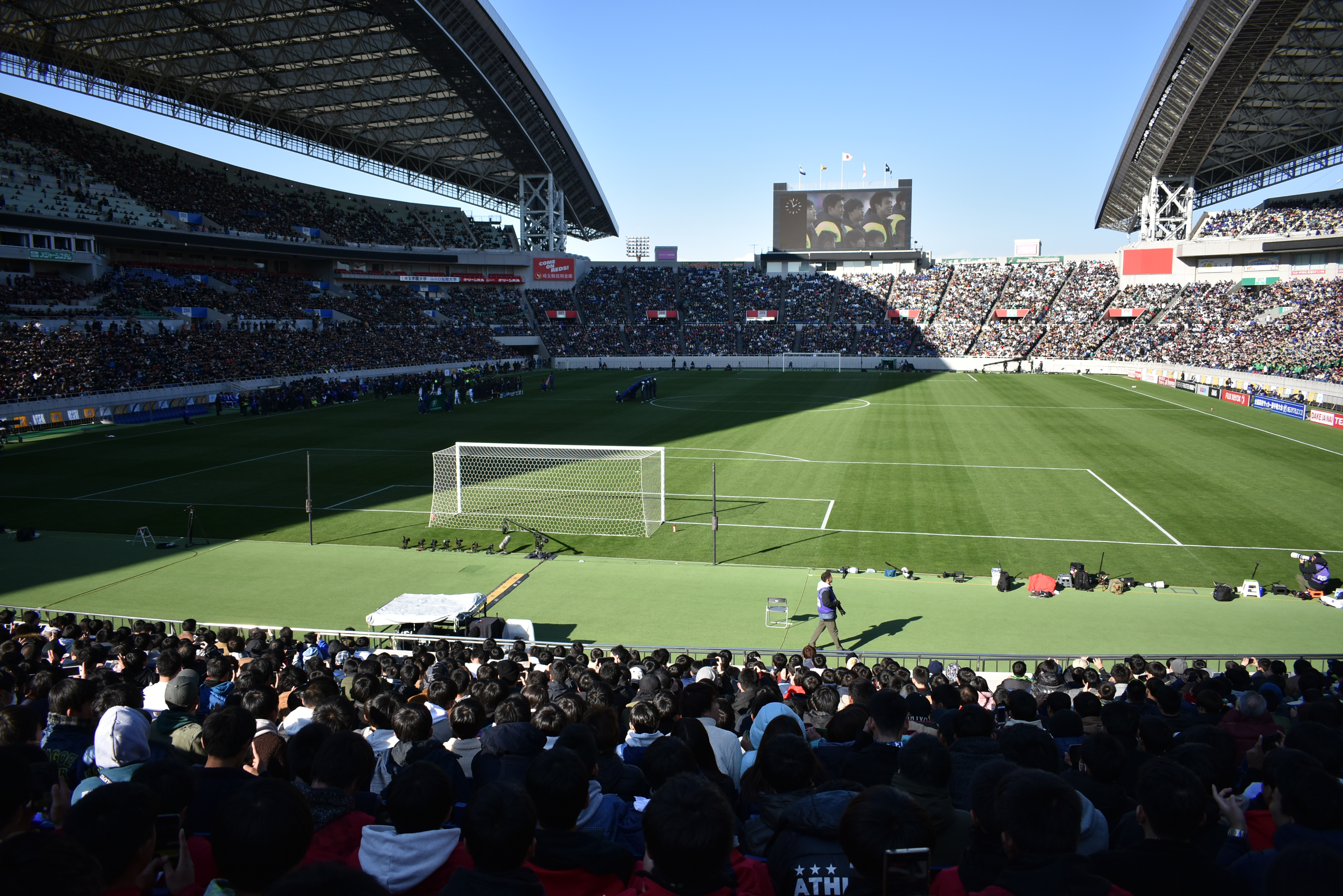
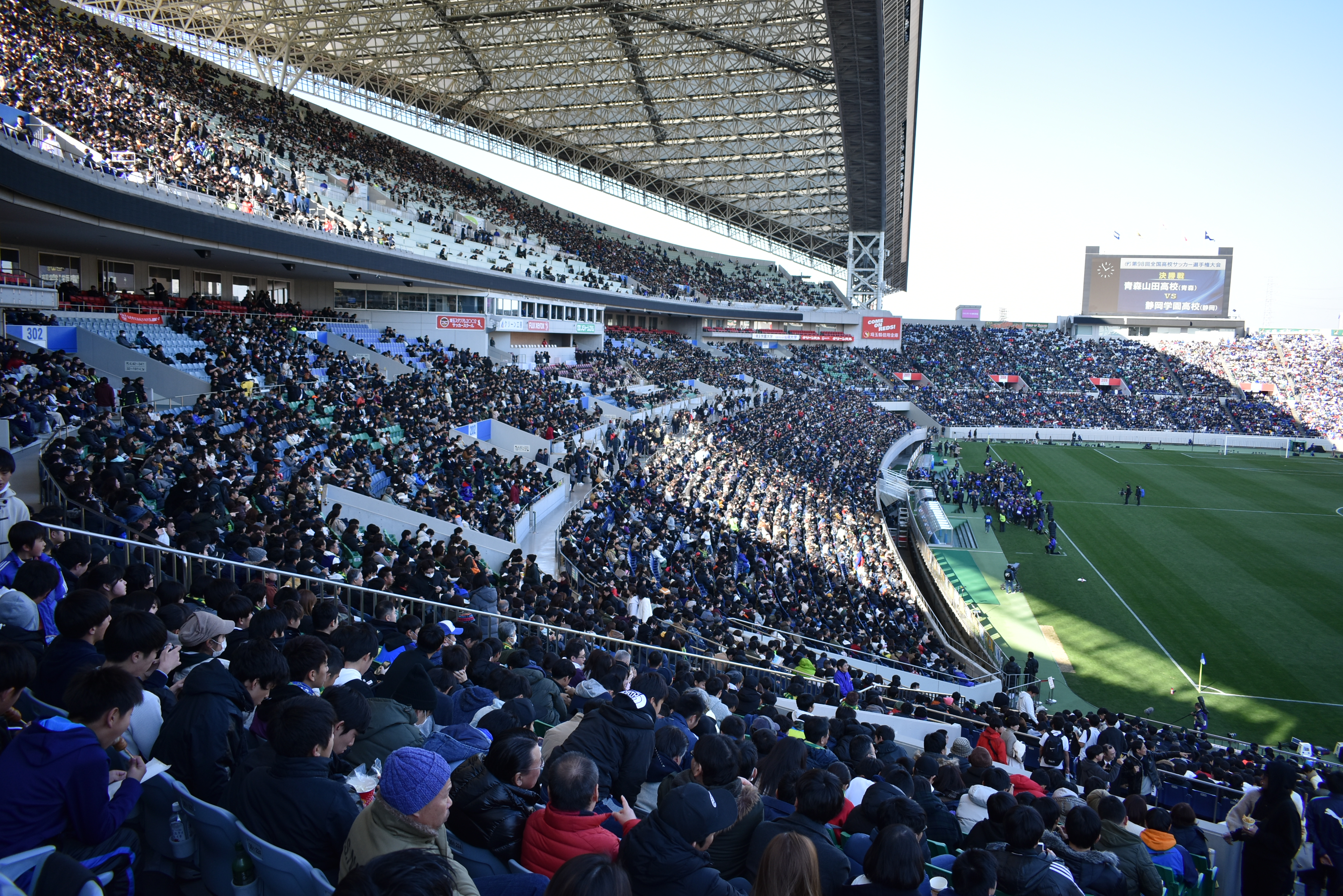

== See also ==
- Lists of stadiums
- List of football stadiums in Japan
- List of stadiums in Japan

Events and tenants
Preceded by National Stadium	All Japan High School Soccer Tournament finals venue 2014–present	Succeeded by TBD
Preceded by National Stadium	Host of the J.League Cup finals 2014–present	Succeeded by current
