= Bicycle locker =

Locker or box that holds bicycles

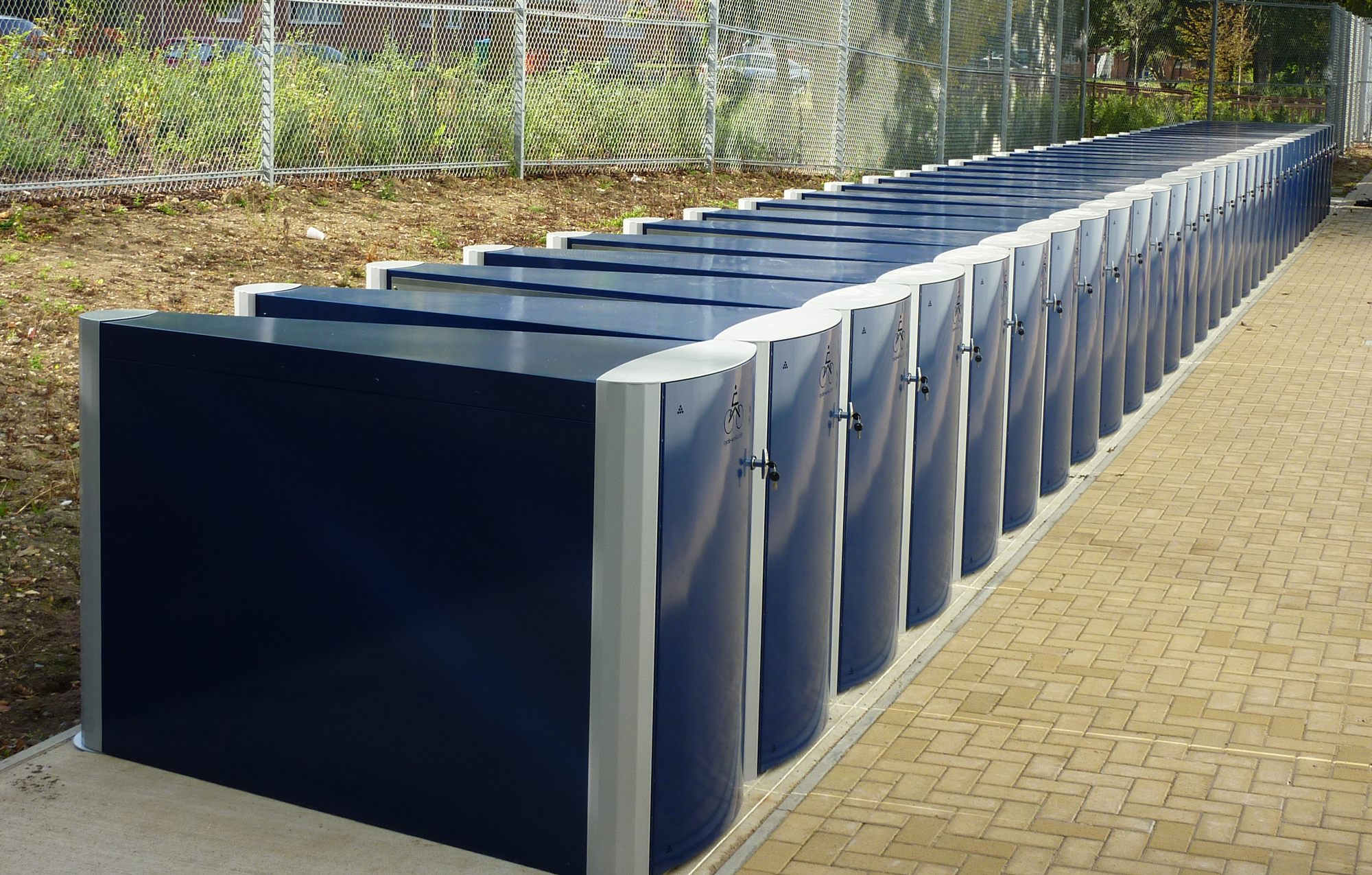
32 Cycle-Works Velo-Safe Lockers installed at Antelope Park, Southampton, UK

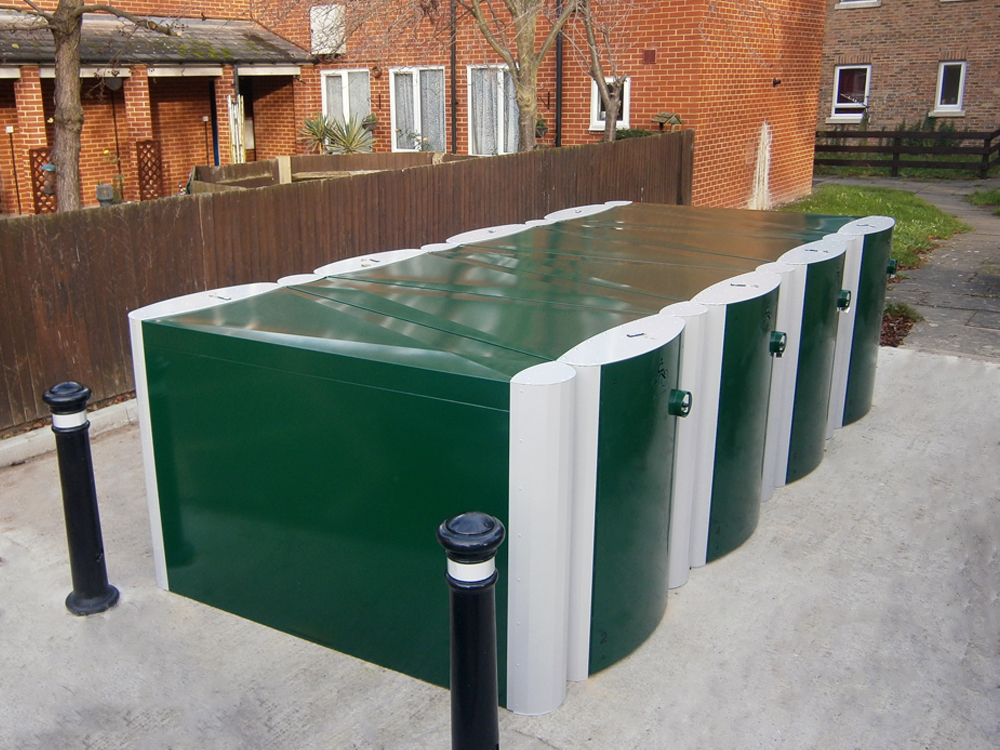
8 Cycle-Works Velo-Safe Lockers installed Back to back in Reading, UK

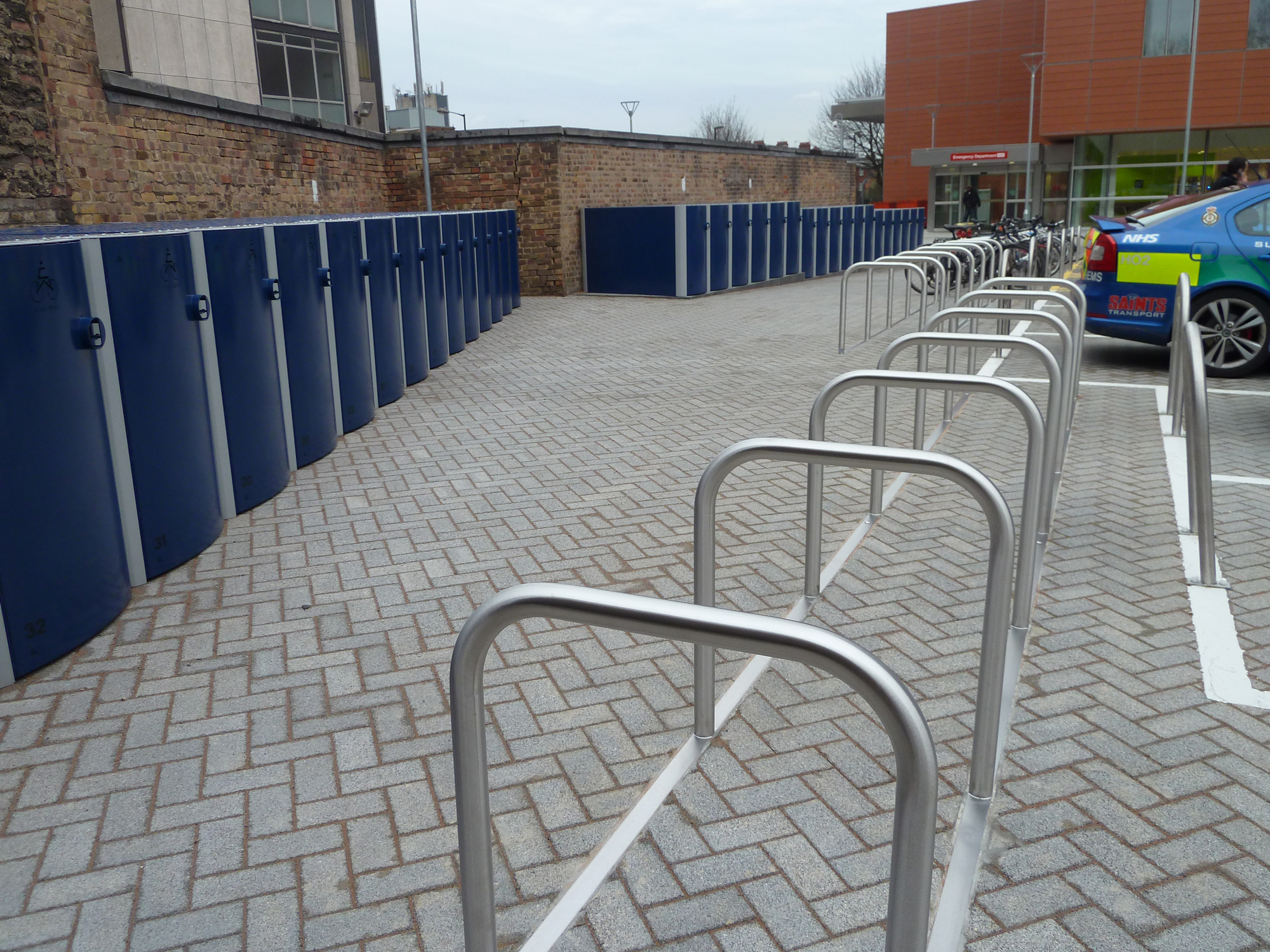
30 Cycle-Works Velo-Safe Lockers installed at Royal London, Barts Hospital

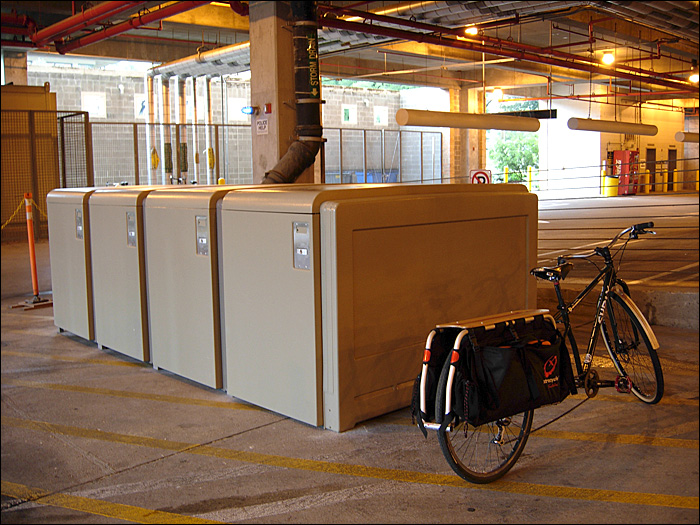
CycleSafe Bike lockers in an undercroft.

A bicycle locker or bike box is a locker or box in which bicycles can be placed and locked, usually 1 or 2 per locker. They are usually provided at places where numerous cyclists need bike parking for extended times (such as during the working day), yet where the bikes might otherwise get damaged or stolen (such as at public bus terminals).

Bicycle lockers are considered the highest standard of bike safety (better than locked compounds or simple bike stands) because they prevent theft, shelter bicycles from the weather, and deter casual vandalism.

== Shapes ==
Lockers are usually either rectangular boxes or formed as triangles where the handlebars of the bicycle are on the wide side of the triangle. Bicycle lockers can support up to 2 bicycles by having a diagonal partition allowing for dual-sided access. Triangle wedged shaped lockers can also be combined to form a rectangular box with two individual lockers facing back to back. They can also be arranged in a circular pattern around a center point or fanning out from a corner. Some lockers can also be installed in a straight line standing shoulder to shoulder. Some rarer types are either upright like school lockers (which requires the bicycle to be suspended from a hook inside) or are stacked twice high, with some attendant difficulties in inserting and removing bikes in the top row.

Bike Lockers are usually built with solid sides to protect against weather, vandalism, and theft. However, problems encountered with this approach (such as being used by homeless people as sleepouts, or for the storage of things other than bicycles) have led to newer designs which incorporate windows or grilles through which inspection staff can see inside.

== Locks ==
Bike locker locks depend on whether the boxes are rented out on a fixed period basis, or whether they are first-come-first served. Those which are rented out for a set period of time usually come with a specific key. Those which are usable on a more casual basis either allow the door to be locked by a padlock brought along by the user, or provide a rental system that dispenses a key or code.

Statistics from the BART rail system suggest that the effective capacity of an on-demand locker bank is 7- 10 times higher than a similar sized exclusive locker bank.

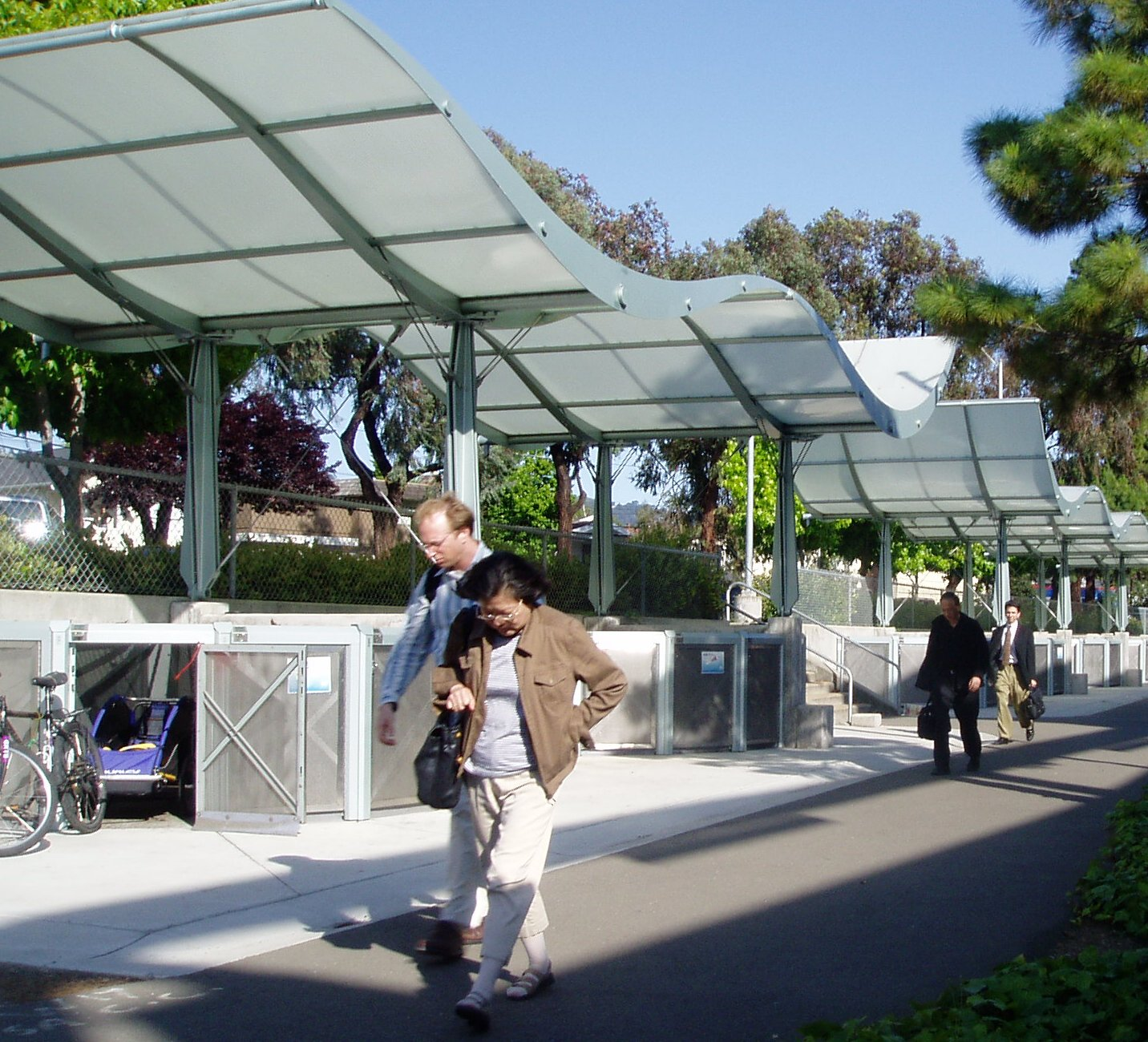
On-demand bicycle lockers arranged in semi-circular banks, Secure on demand bike parking that you pay by the hour in El Cerrito, California, United States. Built by eLock Technologies.

== Automated lockers ==
Automated bicycle parking is becoming more common in Europe. These systems often store the bikes underground and usually function with users using a microchip card and a personal pin code to store and retrieve their bicycles.

One mechanized system is the Bike Tree. When a user presents an access card, a motor lowers a hook from the top of the "tree". The front wheel of the cycle is attached to the hook, and a motor returns the hook to the top of the tree. The system was pioneered by Bicycle Tree International, headquartered in Geneva, Switzerland, a company which has however since ceased operations. JFE Engineering in Japan produce a system called Cycle Tree; the installation at Kasai Station Bicycle Parking Lot in Tokyo has space for 6,480 bicycles, the largest underground mechanical bicycle parking system in the world.

Another more advanced automated bicycle parking system uses a rotary lift system and is integrated in small towers. There are up to 20 bicycle lockers in each tower with a very small foot print area. The system was pioneered by V-Locker Ltd in Dübendorf near Zurich.

With IoT (Internet of Things) smart bicycle locker solutions are emerging. The cyclist can administrate the parking from his/her phone. SafeBikely from Norway delivers lockers to several Norwegian cities.

== See also ==
- Bicycle parking
- Bicycle stand
- Bicycle theft
- Bicycle tree
- Sucker pole
