= Two-wheeler usage in Japan =

Motorized and non-motorized two-wheel transportation in Japan

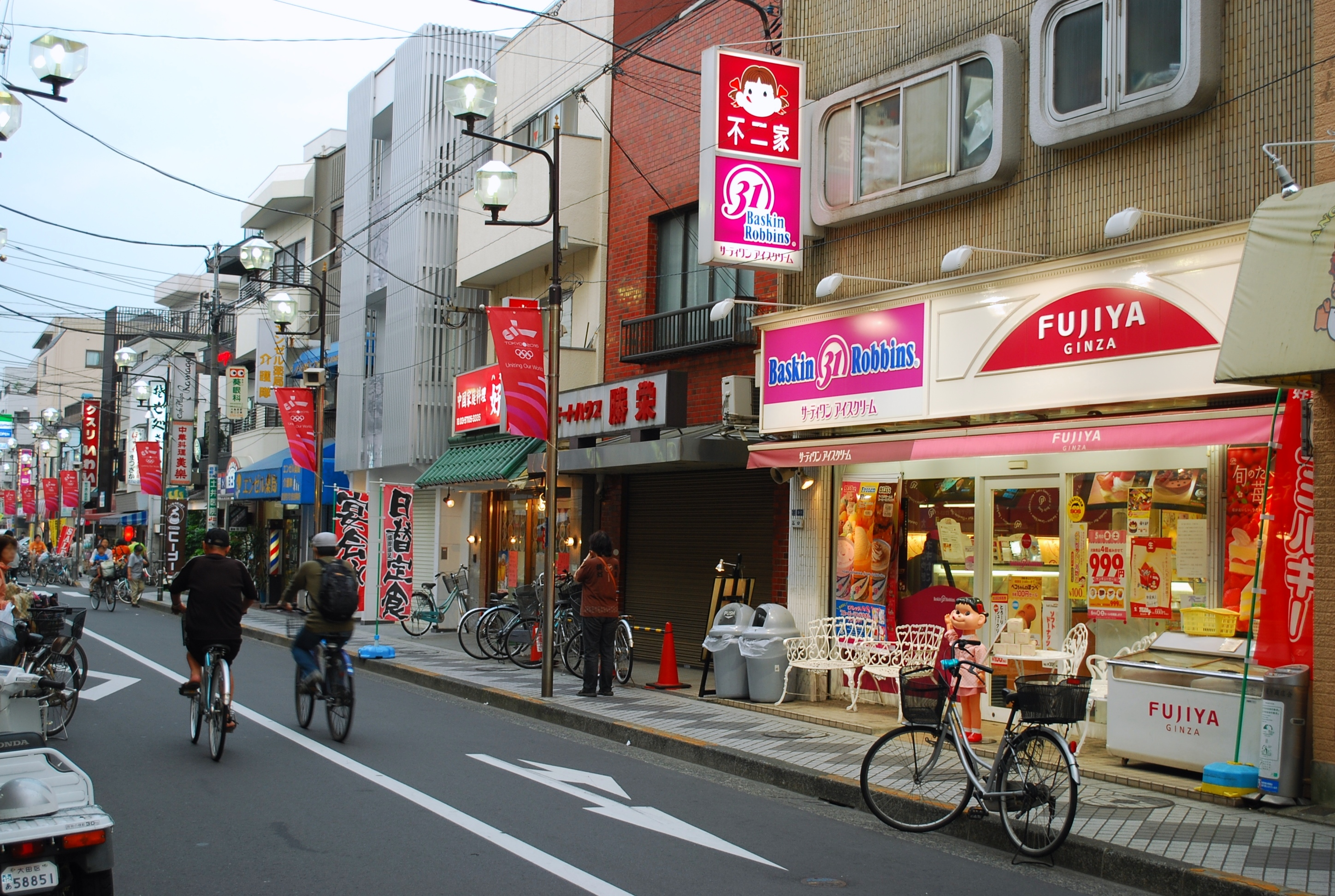
Cycling in the street of Ōta, Tokyo

Two-wheelers are a common sight and widely used in Japan. Of these, bicycles and scooters are the most common.

== Bicycles ==
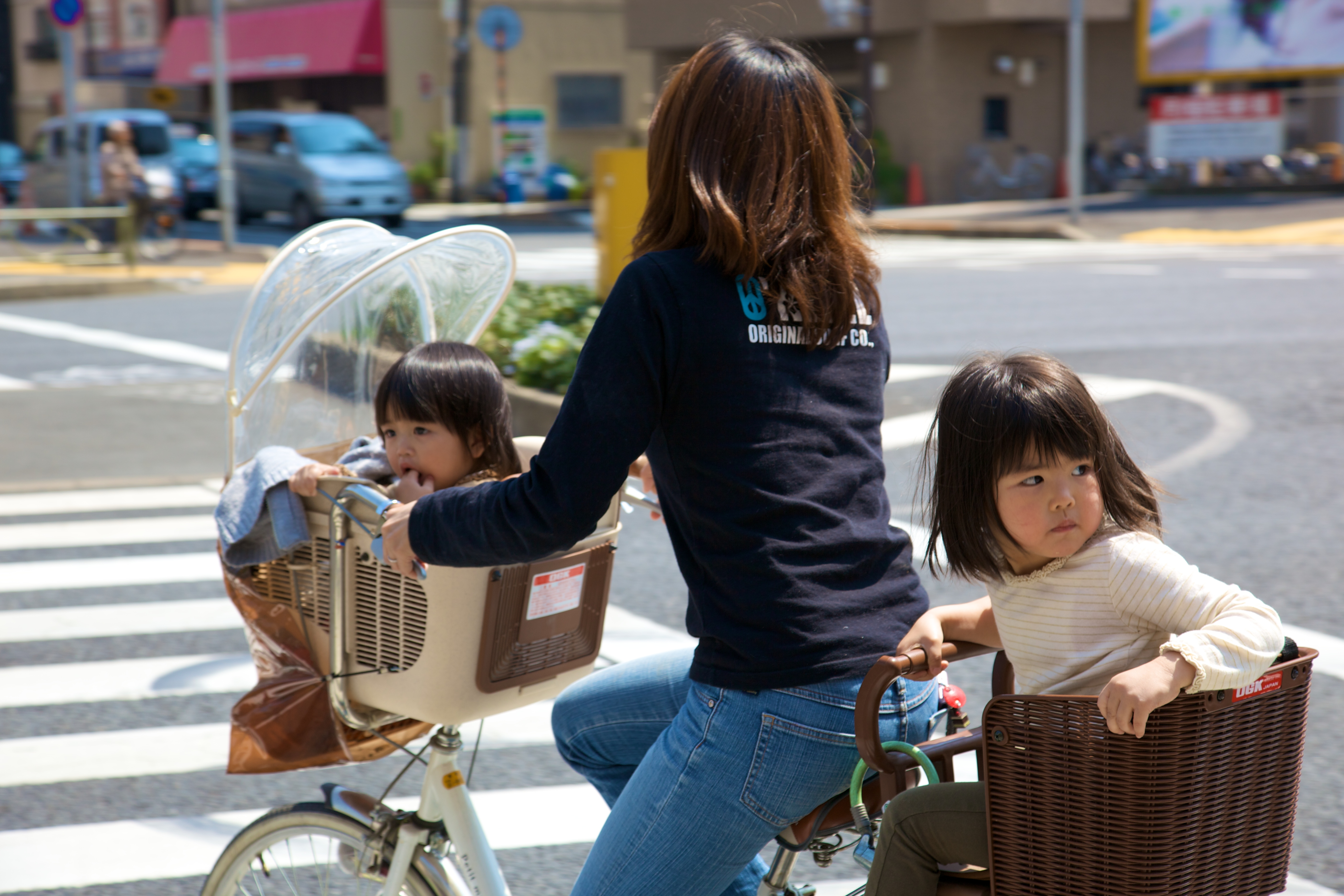
A woman cycling with two young children in Tokyo

There are over 80 million bicycles in Japan. Some 17 percent of trips from home to work and school are made by bicycle.

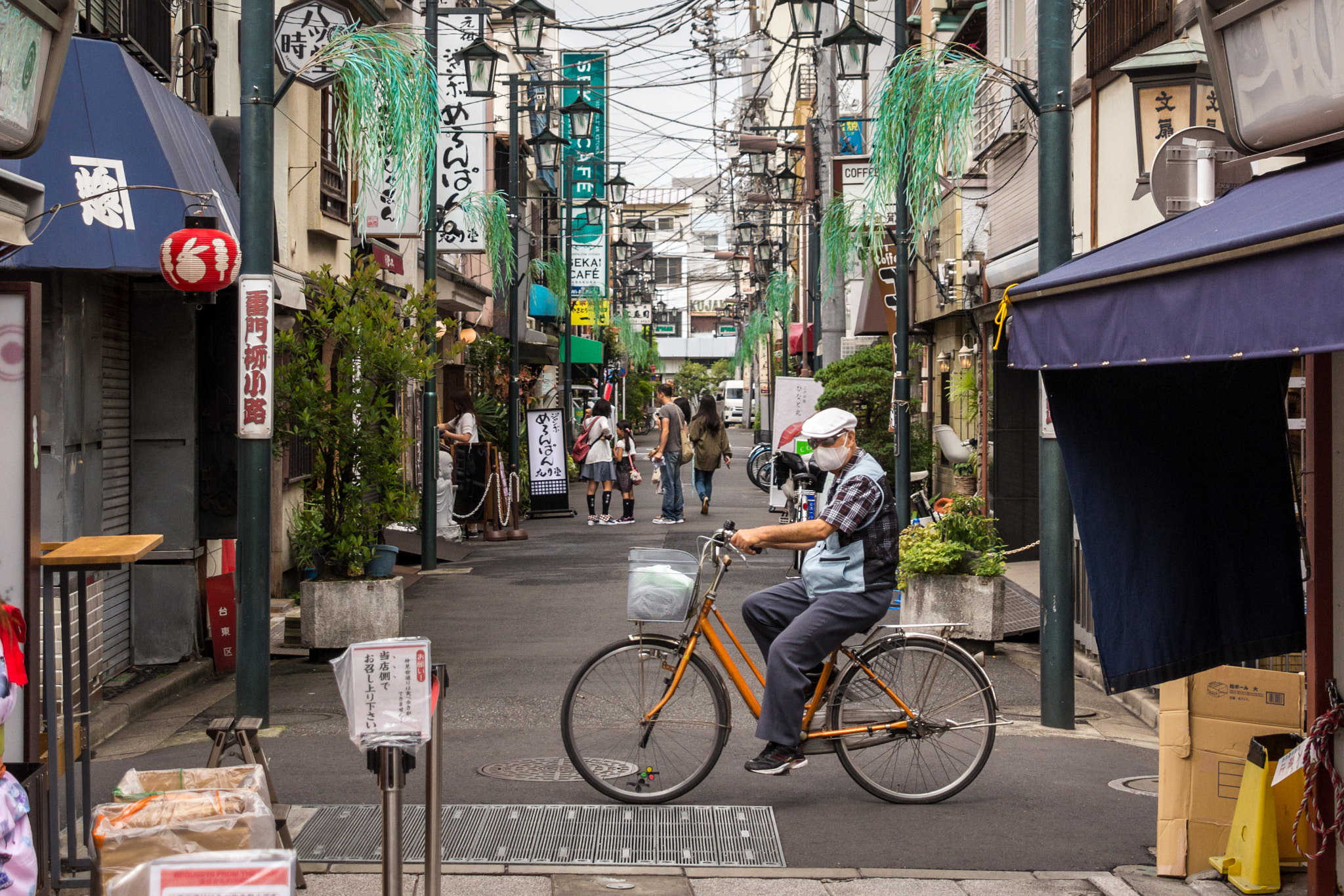
Elderly man riding in Asakusa, Tokyo

In most residential neighbourhoods, historically narrow streets create a natural traffic calming effect that encourages cycling. Motorists on these streets must often drive carefully due to a lack of sidewalks (allowing pedestrians to walk freely in the street), obstructions such as utility poles and blind corners at many intersections. Relatively low speed limits of 20 to 30 km/h (12 to 19 mph) and motorist collision liability are additional factors that encourage more careful driving on residential streets.

Cycling is one of Japan's major modes of transport for trips of up to 3 km (1.9 mi), and makes up a significant proportion of trips within 10 km (6.2 mi). However, due to the high availability of other transport modes, longer distance cycling is less common in Japan than in the United States. Cycling speeds are generally slow and recreational. People generally do not wear gear or helmets as cycling serves primarily as a last mile (transportation) solution. and/or economical or hour independent alternative to extensive railway-feeder bus or municipal bus service.

Bicycles have long been a major staple of Japanese transport (as well as walking), and train stations often accommodate them. A major popularization boom in cycling occurred following the 1970s oil crises and has not abated since. Bicycle sheds dominate bicycle storage mechanisms in Japan, most often found at train stations, however they are giving way to other solutions such as bicycle sharing systems and bicycle trees. In spite of bicycle sheds, there long has existed the problem of insufficient bicycle parking, and bicycles can be found parked haphazardly at the more urban train stations, inviting fines and mishaps, though this trend is also in decline. Unlike in North America, bicycles are not allowed on buses nor do buses have bicycle carriers. Vandalism to locked bicycles for parts is quite uncommon, as there is virtually no black market in bicycle parts due to strong policing and general public disregard for stolen items.

=== Infrastructure ===
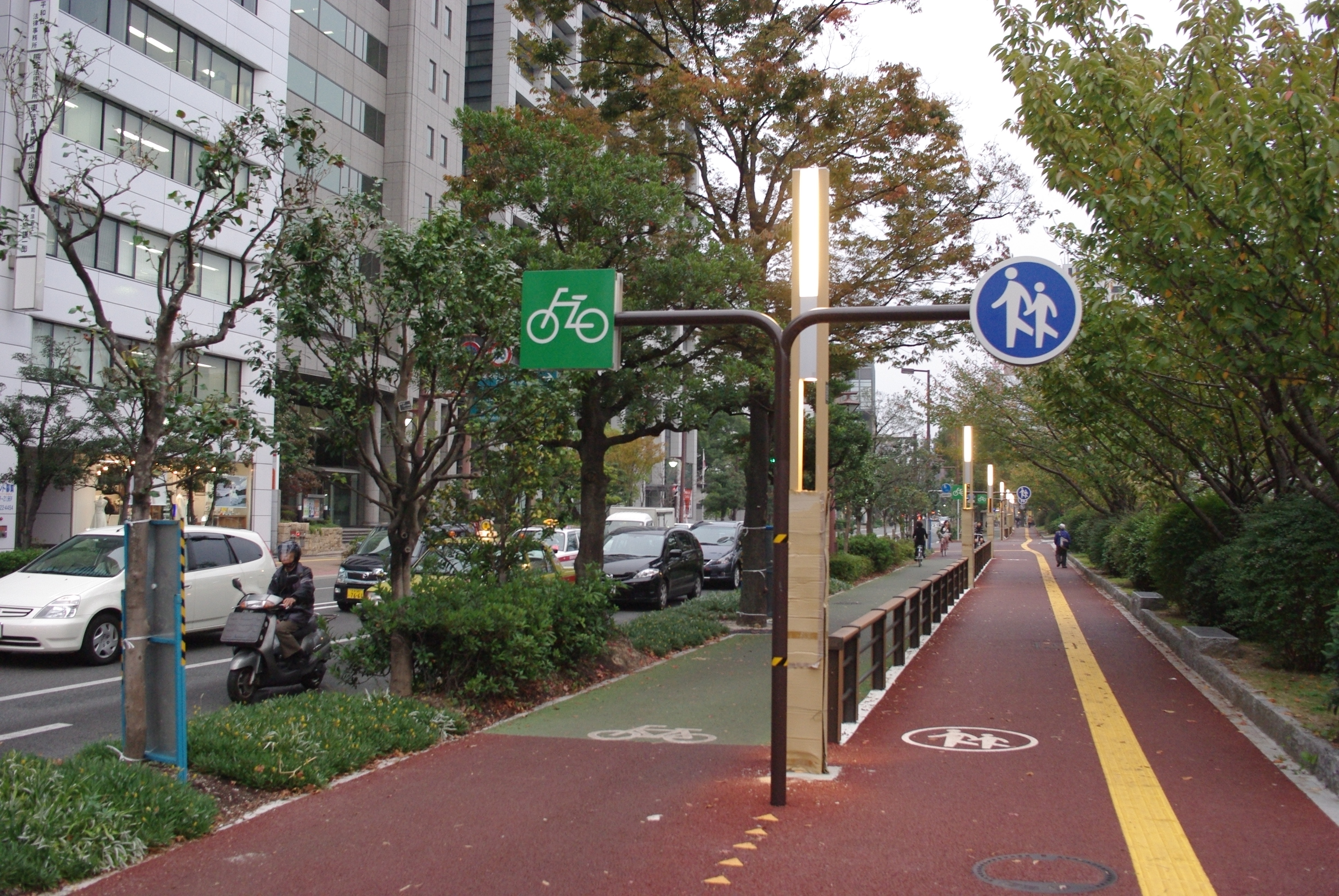
Bike Path in Fukuoka, Japan

In Japan, cycling infrastructure is generally shared with other infrastructure (94%) and generally not marked. There is almost no extensive system of separate cycling facilities with well-maintained discriminated paths, lanes and special bicycle streets. Exclusive bicycle roadway accounts for only 1,978 km (1,229 mi) or 2% of all roadway.

Walking and Cycling Permitted sign found on Japanese sidewalks

While Japan's Road Traffic Act of 1960 (道路交通法, Dōro Kōtsūhō) initially required cyclists to ride on the left hand side of the street (along with other motorized traffic), this led to a dramatic rise in cycling accidents. As a result, rules were loosened to allow cycling on designated sidewalks by the Road Structure Ordinance of 1970, which also introduced the provision of bicycle roads in high traffic areas. Since that time, bicycles have become a common sight on many Japanese sidewalks, while segregated cycling infrastructure still remains relatively rare throughout the country.

Sidewalks where cycling is permitted often contain obstacles such as illegally parked bicycles, utility poles, trees, road signs and street furniture in addition to pedestrians. They are often narrow with uneven, poorly maintained pavement. As a result, cyclists and pedestrians often come into conflict with one another. As an example of this ongoing conflict, from the year 2002 to 2012 the number of bicycle-pedestrian accidents in Japan increased by 30%, while the total number of traffic accidents decreased by a similar margin.

=== Bicycle parking ===
Bicycles sheds are a common site at train stations, and can hold hundreds or even thousands of bicycles. Despite this, there are problems with this system: theft or borrowing with the intent to return is common, abandoned bicycles clog the system with nobody knowing who they belong to, and after hours retrieval can be frustrating.

==== Automated bicycle trees ====
Bicycle trees are a proposed solution to long-standing bicycle storage and security issues. Some are capable of storing thousands of bicycles cleanly, securely, and out of sight, and fitted with an automated storage and retrieval system at train stations. IC cards are utilized in the system. Some 85 of these systems are installed throughout the country.

=== Bike sharing ===
Bicycle sharing systems are a more modern concept in Japan, and largest such system is in Edogawa ward of Tokyo. Since ownership of bicycles is still high, bike sharing would have less appeal in Japan than other nations.

== Scooters ==
Gasoline powered scooters were once quite popular for college students, working age people of both sexes and seniors. Use declined dramatically from June 1, 2006 when new road safety law put parking enforcement into the hands of private traffic wardens, with the intent of freeing up police to pursue violations greater than parking. Prior to introduction of the new law, automobile tires were chalked by police, who could issue a violation after the vehicle had been illegally parked for 15 minutes or greater. Female officers traveling in specially designed vehicles would rotate through congested areas, reaching out of their window with chalk on long sticks to mark tires. The logistics involved meant scooters were all but ignored and could park freely on sidewalks and roadways. However, under the new guidelines, tickets could be issued immediately by a new privatized patrol force. As a consequence of near zero enforcement prior to June 1, 2006, paid hourly parking for scooters was nearly non-existent.

The parking fine for a scooter is 9,000 yen per instance. The registered owner of the scooter is responsible for payment and a request for payment will be sent to the registered address if prior payment with the issued ticket is not made. If payment is made with the ticket, which would require the person making payment to sign the ticket admitting they had parked illegally, a two-point reduction is made on their license. If, within one year, 6 points are lost, a driver's license is suspended for 30 days. If 15 points are deducted a driver's license is revoked for 1 year, after which an individual may apply for a new license from scratch; time-consuming and not always obtainable.

A special moped license category exists, primarily for those who are 16 but not yet 21. At 18, an automobile license can be obtained, which also allows the holder to operate a scooter. However, points even when received for scooter parking violations are applied against whichever license the driver holds. So effectively, for 3 parking scooter violations in a one-year period, the license will be suspended. This would preclude not only driving the scooter, but the suspension would apply to all driving, automobile or otherwise. It is also widely recognized the police target small engine scooters for traffic violations. Up to 50cc's, scooters are not allowed to turn right, unless under very specific situations (e.g. traveling on a one-way) or exceed 30 km/h (19 mph).

Since 2006, efforts have been made to increase available hourly parking for scooters. While a major shortfall of hourly parking continues, an incentive program to land owners of 200,000 yen for each bike (motor or scooter) space saw the rise of many new parking spots for motorized bikes within major cities. This, coupled with a non-statutory relaxation of private traffic warden enforcement, forcing them to focus on automobiles and to not issue tickets to scooters in all but the most severely congested and designated areas have made the ability to find a place to stop once reaching a destination by scooter once again feasible.

Scooters continue to fill a key niche as commercial vehicles for delivery services, often of food or other smaller items. Scooters, especially during rush hours, are generally speedier than automobiles for household delivery (often roads can be narrow and steep grades are not uncommon in mountainous Japan). Unlike China, electric scooters are not so common.

== Motorcycles ==
Japan has a cult of larger engine motorcycle enthusiasts, but as far as transportation is concerned, its more of a recreational vehicle than a utilitarian vehicle.
