= Bicycle tree =

Type of bicycle parking system

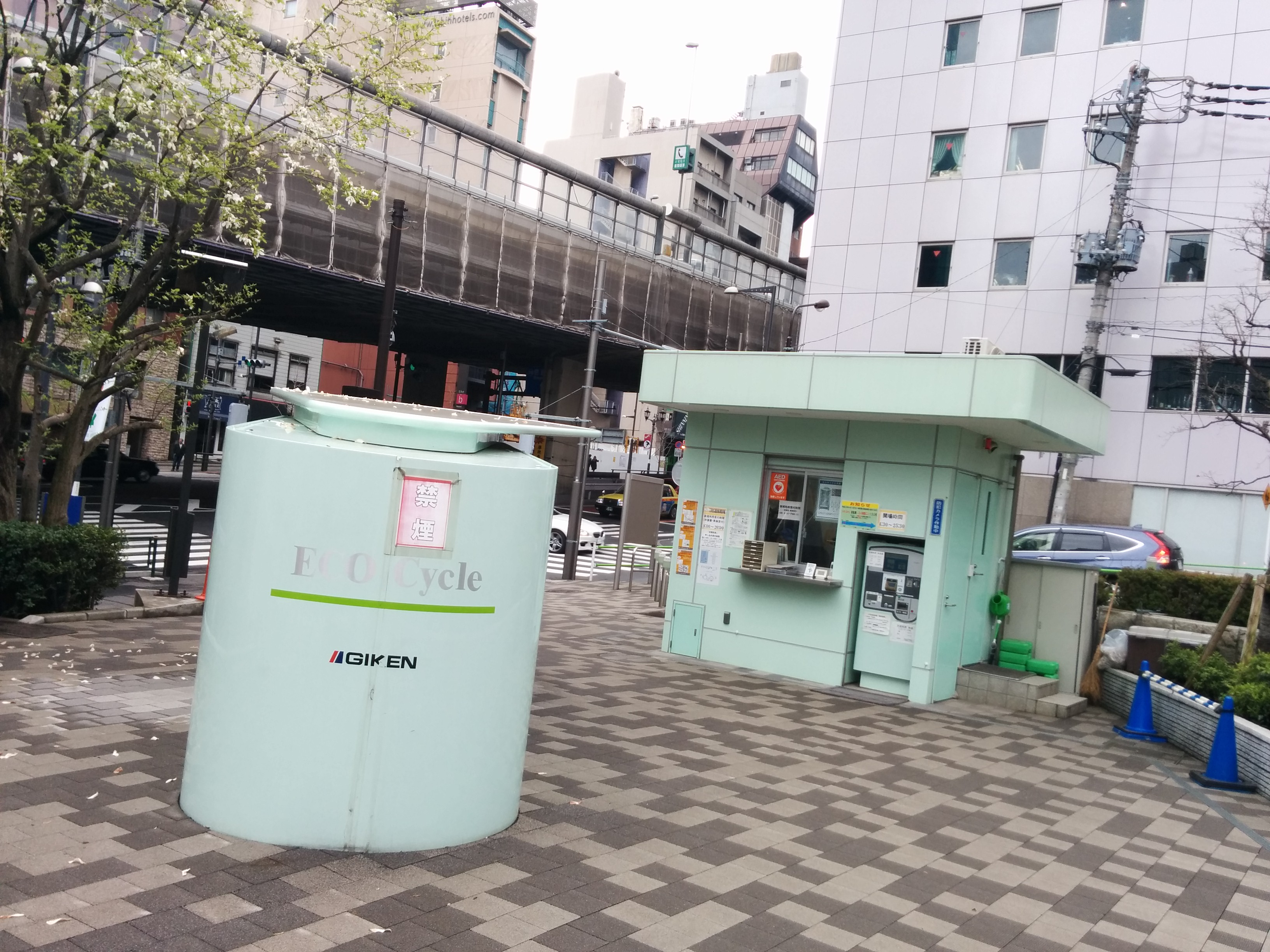
System in Roppongi holding 204 bicycles, with a public area above

A bicycle tree or cycle tree or bike tree is a bicycle parking system that resembles a tree in shape. There are a few types that have been developed.

Some are manual, some use mechanical means to move the bike, assisting the bike by raising into a particular spot, they can handle between 5–20 bicycles depending on size. They are made by various companies in Europe and North America. Still others, like the one made by JFE Steel of Japan, are fully automated and computerized and can handle and locate some 9,400 bicycles for example, underneath a major train station or university.

== Manual ==
Various companies have developed simple bike trees, including ones for sale at a hardware store, such as Harbor Freight Tools, that have hooks to hang 5 bicycles.

== Mechanical assisted ==
A Swiss company, Bike Tree International, designed a system whereby a bicycle can be hoisted into a tree-shaped device after lifting the front of the bike and connecting the wheel to a hook by rope. There were plans to deploy this machine in Geneva. It can handle one or two dozen bicycles.

== Automated storage and retrieval system ==
A similar but much larger device, an automated storage and retrieval system, has been developed by JFE Engineering, a unit of JFE Holdings of Japan. The first bike tree of this type became available for public use in 2006, storing 1,476 bicycles using an integrated circuit based tag system, cleanly stored away above ground in an urban office-like building. Mechanical units have been expanded to hold some 6,480 bicycles, for which retrieval time is 23 seconds, such as in this 15 meter deep underground storage facility. Various municipalities in the Greater Tokyo area run the system or are planning to install them, charging 1800 yen per month for storage or a one time fee of 100 yen. As of February 2013, some 85 systems of this manufacturer and type in use can hold 17,323 bicycles, all in Japan.

== See also ==
- Bicycle locker
- Bicycle stand
