= Seaforth & Litherland railway station =

Railway station in Merseyside, England

Seaforth & Litherland
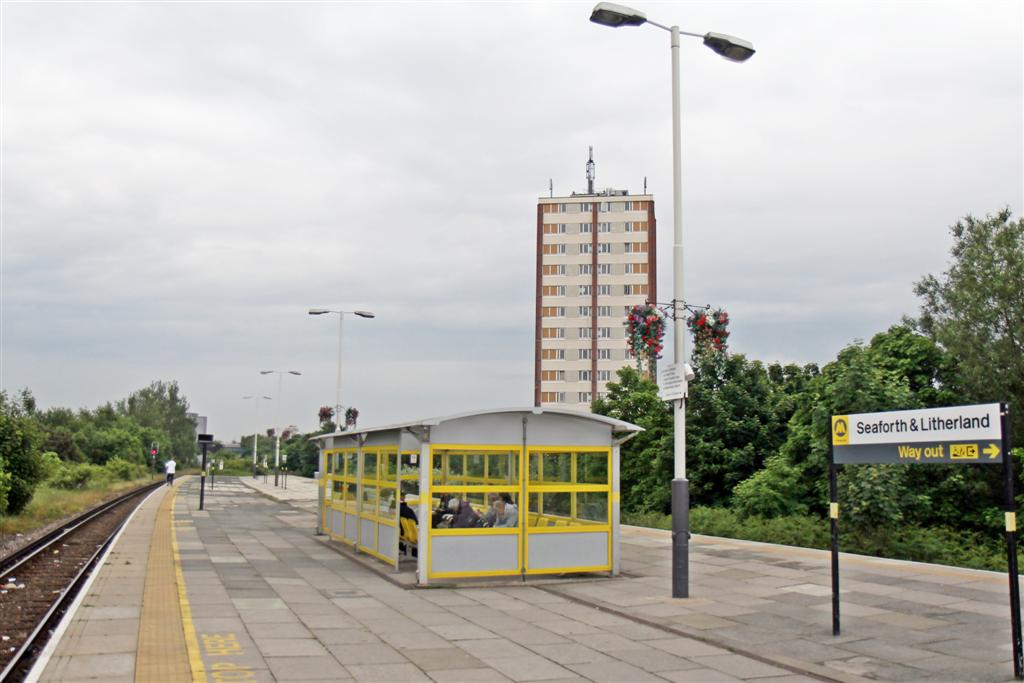

General information
- Location: Seaforth, Sefton; England
- Coordinates: 53.4657°N 3.0050°W
- Grid reference: SJ333970
- Manager: Merseyrail
- Transit authority: Merseytravel
- Platforms: 2

Other information
- Station code: SFL
- Fare zone: C3
- Classification: DfT category E

History
- Original company: Liverpool, Crosby and Southport Railway
- Pre-grouping: Lancashire and Yorkshire Railway
- Post-grouping: London, Midland and Scottish Railway

Key dates
- 1 October 1850: Opened as Seaforth
- 1886/1887: Station rebuilt
- July 1905: Renamed Seaforth and Litherland
- 2 November 1959: Closed for goods

Passengers
- 2021/22: ▲0.716 million
- 2022/23: ▲0.880 million
- 2023/24: ▲0.922 million
- 2024/25: ▼0.852 million
- 2025/26: ▲0.907 million
Location
Notes
- Passenger statistics from the Office of Rail and Road

Seaforth & Litherland railway station is a railway station in Seaforth, Merseyside, England, on the Northern Line of the Merseyrail network. It also serves the adjacent area of Litherland.

There are around four trains per hour, taking around 15 minutes to/from Liverpool Central.

== History ==
The main section of the Liverpool, Crosby and Southport Railway (LC&SR), that between Waterloo and Southport, opened in July 1848.

On 1 October 1850, the line was extended southwards to Sandhills, where it connected with an existing joint line into Liverpool. The joint line was the East Lancashire Railway's (ELR), (former Liverpool, Ormskirk and Preston Railway) line from Preston and the Lancashire and Yorkshire Railway's (L&YR), (former Liverpool and Bury Railway) from Wigan, Bolton and Bury.

This station was opened as Seaforth as part of the extension into Liverpool. It was 4 1/2 miles (7.2 km) from the new southern terminus at Tithebarn Street/Liverpool Exchange station. (Note: The station had two names because the joint owners could not agree on a name. The (L&YR) named the station Liverpool Exchange Station with the (ELR) naming the station Liverpool Tithebarn Street.)

The station was located at a level crossing on south side of Marsh Lane (which became Bridge Road). The station building was on the up platform and had offices with an awning supported by pillars, the down side had a waiting shelter. (Note: Up trains usually headed towards the major conurbation, usually London, some railway companies ran 'up' to their headquarters location. In this case 'up' was towards Liverpool.)

In 1850 the LC&SR had been authorised to lease, sell or transfer itself to the L&YR and on 14 June 1855 the L&YR purchased and took over the LC&SR.

The station was rebuilt in 1886, elevated on an embankment, the road being crossed by two plate-girder bridges each carrying two lines. The new high-level station opened in two stages, trains to Liverpool running from 26 December 1886, and trains to Southport from 9 January 1887. The station now had four platforms with four running lines, there were two platforms on the outer edges and a wide island platform serving the inner lines. The station was described as "large and commodious", it was constructed entirely of wood. The platforms had waiting rooms, offices and large awnings, they were accessed by a covered sloping footway from the north.

Immediately north of the two bridges, on the down side, was a goods yard with a shed and a coal depot. The yard was equipped with a five-ton crane.

Seaforth station was renamed Seaforth and Litherland in July 1905.

On 2 July 1905 the station also became a terminus when the L&YR built a new 46 chains (930 m) long section of line between Seaforth Sands and Seaforth & Litherland, enabling Liverpool Overhead Railway (LOR) trains to run through from Dingle in south Liverpool. (Note: Railways in the United Kingdom are, for historical reasons, measured in miles and chains. A chain is 22 yards (20 m) long, there are 80 chains to the mile.)

Most trains ran through to this new northern terminus but some trains still terminated at Seaforth Sands, the track belonged to the L&YR and the LOR had running powers.

A Dingle-Southport service commenced on 2 February 1906 with specially designed, shorter, lightweight rolling stock built by the L&YR, an hourly service was provided but it was not successful and was withdrawn in August, 1914. Thereafter passengers to and from Southport changed trains at Seaforth & Litherland.

The service to Dingle ceased on 30 December 1956, when the LOR was closed completely.

The closure of the LOR and further service reductions meant that four lines were no longer needed through the station and in 1963 the outer lines and platforms were removed leaving one line running over each bridge and a central, island, platform to service them.

The Lancashire and Yorkshire Railway amalgamated with the London and North Western Railway on 1 January 1922 and in turn was Grouped into the London, Midland and Scottish Railway in 1923.

The goods yard closed on 2 November 1959.

In 1978 the station became part of the Merseyrail network's Northern Line (operated by British Rail until privatised in 1995).

The station underwent improvement work in 2009.

== Facilities ==
The station is staffed 15 minutes before the first service and 15 minutes after the last service. There is platform CCTV, shelters and a booking office. There are departure and arrival screens on the platform for passenger information. The station has a 48-space car park, a cycle rack with 6 spaces and secure storage for 28 cycles. The station is fully wheelchair accessible and access to the station is via a ramp which is 30 metres long.

== Services ==
Trains operate every 15 minutes throughout the day from Monday to Saturday to Southport to the north, and to Liverpool Central to the south. Winter Sunday services are every 30 minutes in each direction.

Preceding station	National Rail	Following station
Waterloo towards Southport	Merseyrail; Northern Line	Bootle New Strand towards Liverpool Central
	Historical railways	
Terminus	Liverpool Overhead Railway (1905 to 1956)	Seaforth Sands towards Dingle
Waterloo towards Southport	Liverpool Overhead Railway; Lancashire and Yorkshire Railway (1906 to 1914)	Seaforth Sands towards Dingle
Waterloo towards Southport	Lancashire and Yorkshire Railway; Liverpool, Crosby and Southport Railway	Marsh Lane towards Liverpool Exchange

== Gallery ==
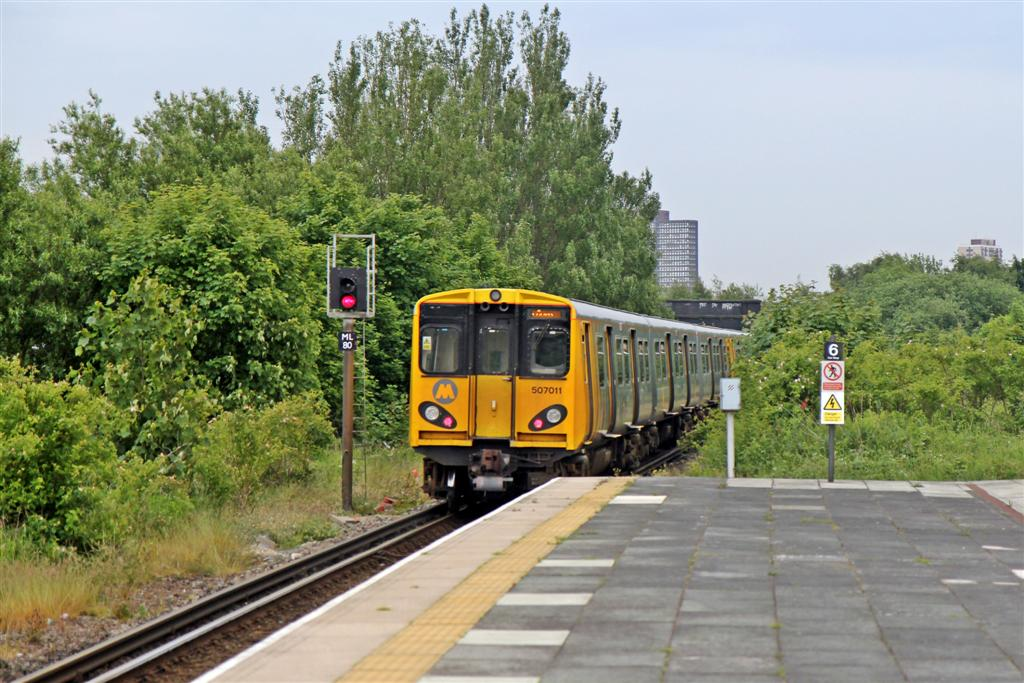
A Merseyrail Class 507 departs towards Liverpool.

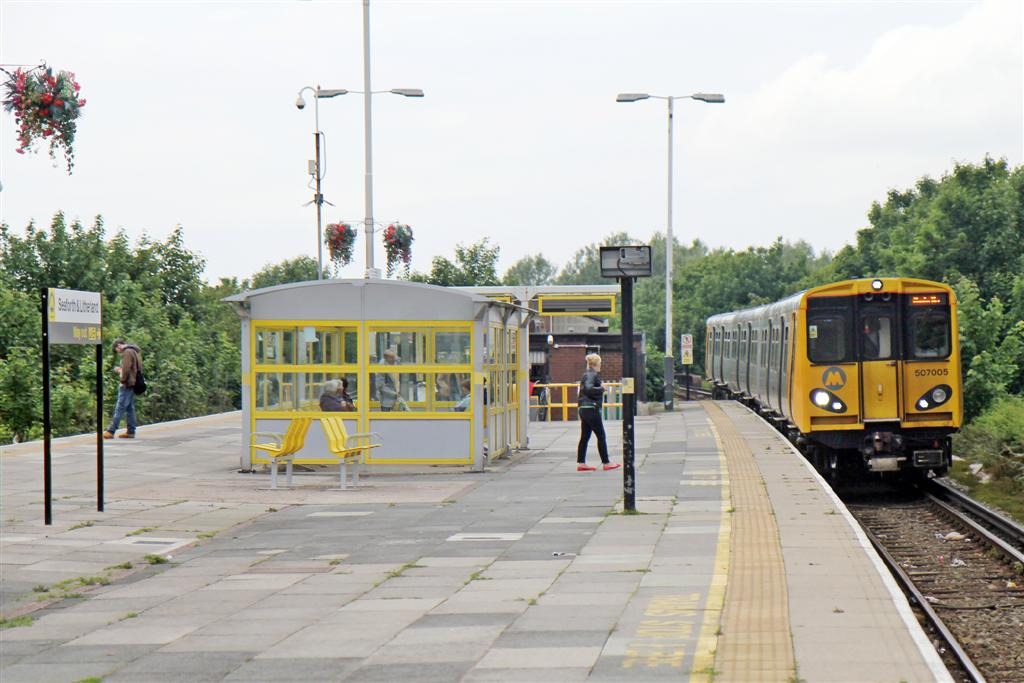
A Merseyrail Class 507 arrives with a service from Southport.

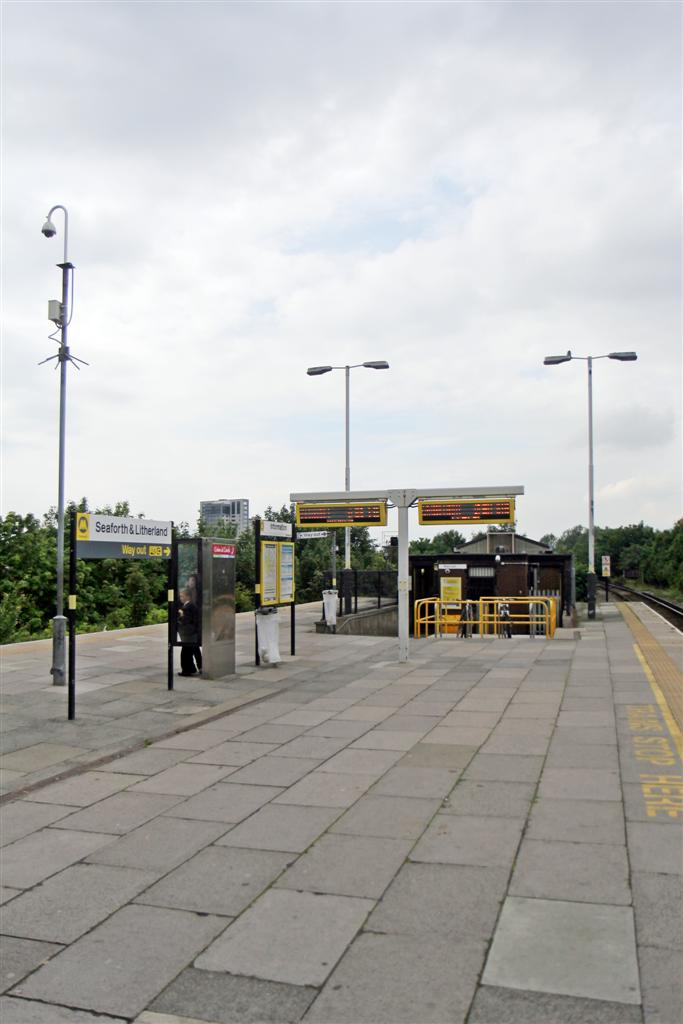
The island platform and entrance.

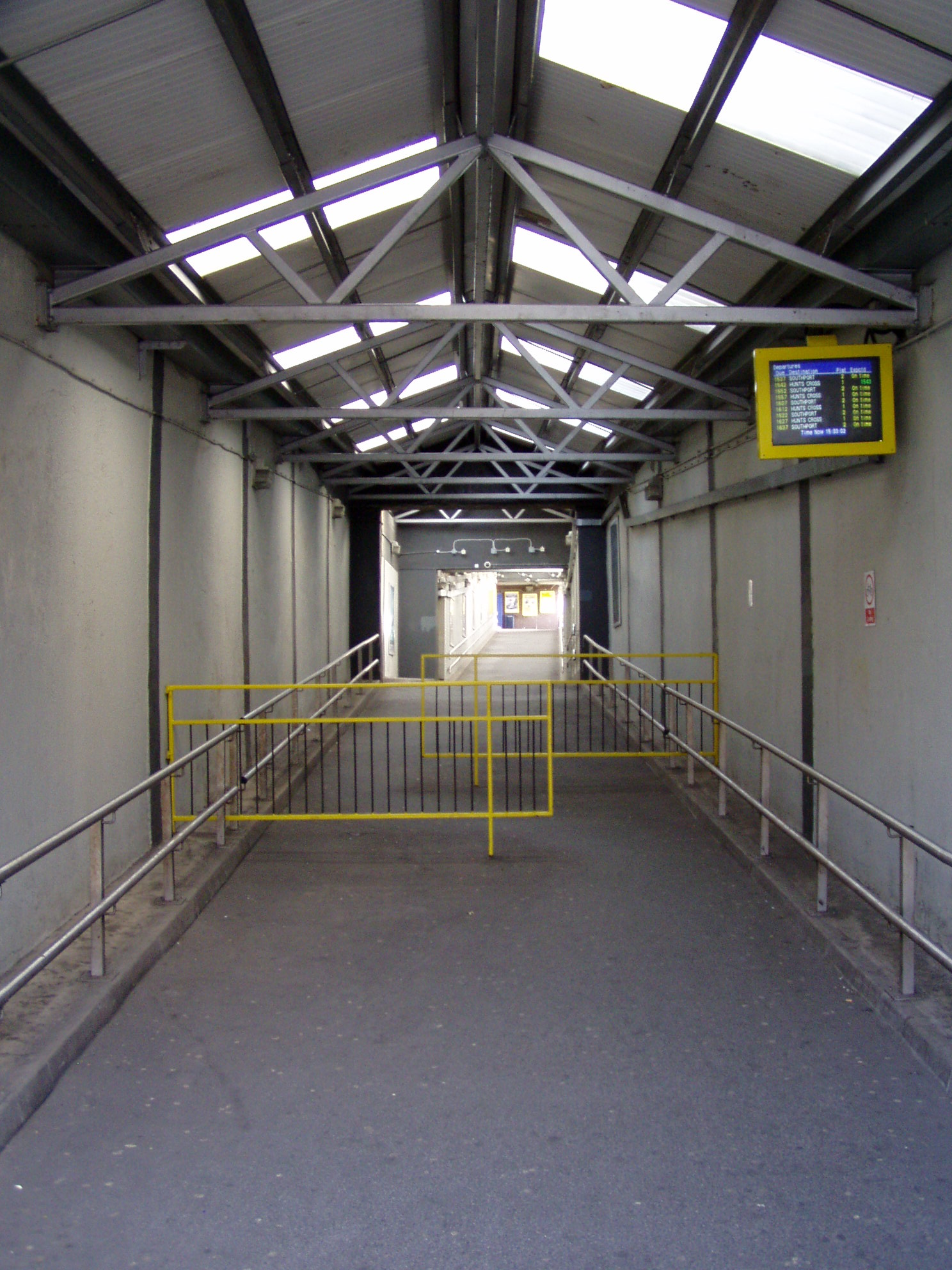
The entrance corridor to the platform.
