= Liverpool Overhead Railway electric units =

Early electric multiple unit train

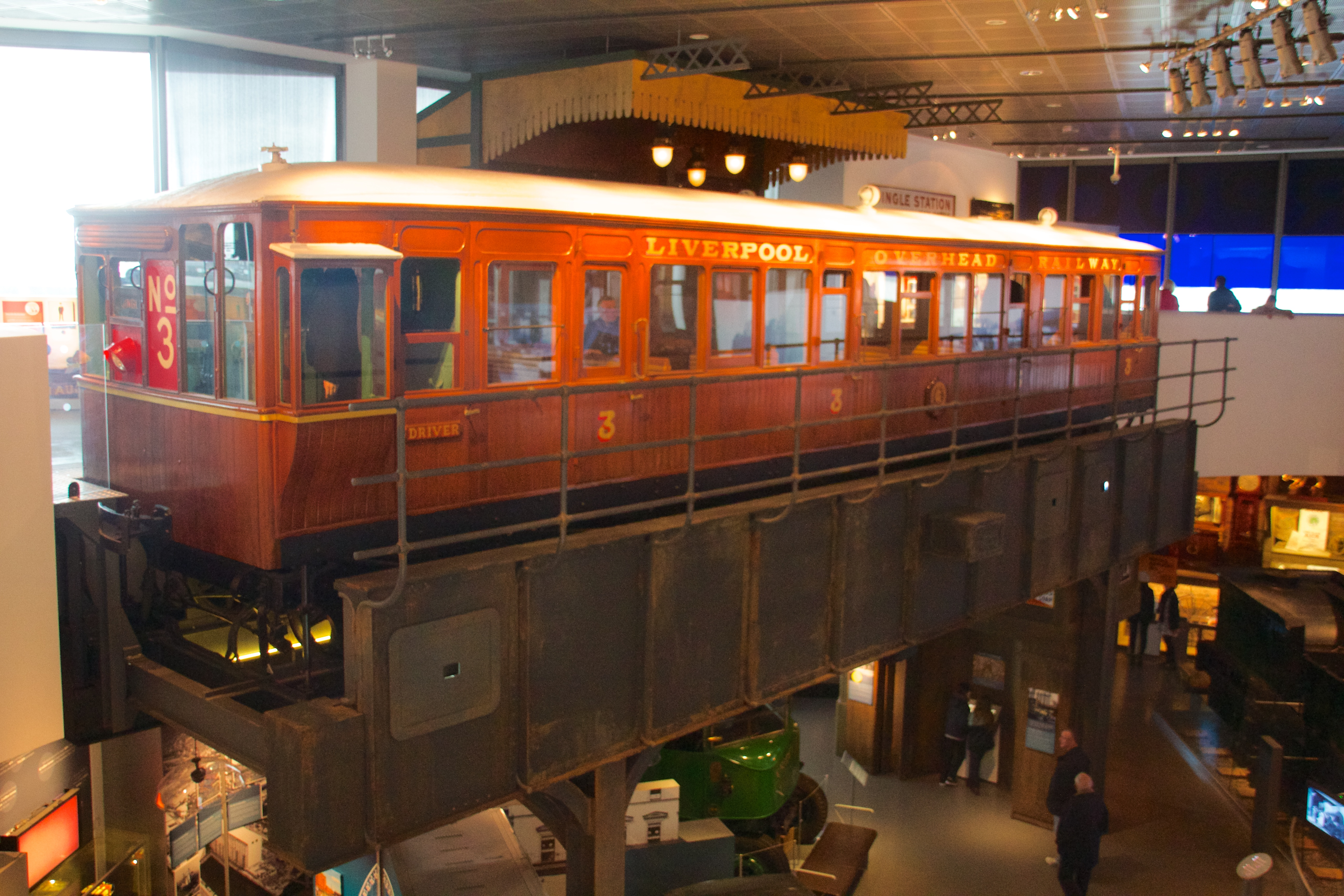
- Liverpool Overhead Railway electric train on display at the Museum of Liverpool.
- In service: 1893–1956
- Manufacturer: Brown, Marshall & Co. Metro-Cammell
- Constructed: 1892–1896; 1916–1918
- Scrapped: 1956
- Number preserved: 2 cars
- Formation: 1–3 cars
- Operators: Liverpool Overhead Railway

Specifications
- Electric system(s): 500–630 V DC (Note: Marsden 2008, p. 68 states the voltage as 600 V DC, whereas Gahan 1982, p. 34 says the LOR was 500 V so when LOR units later ran on the L&YR 630 V system their motors had to be in series mode.)
- Current collection: Third rail
- Track gauge: 4 ft 8 1/2 in (1,435 mm)

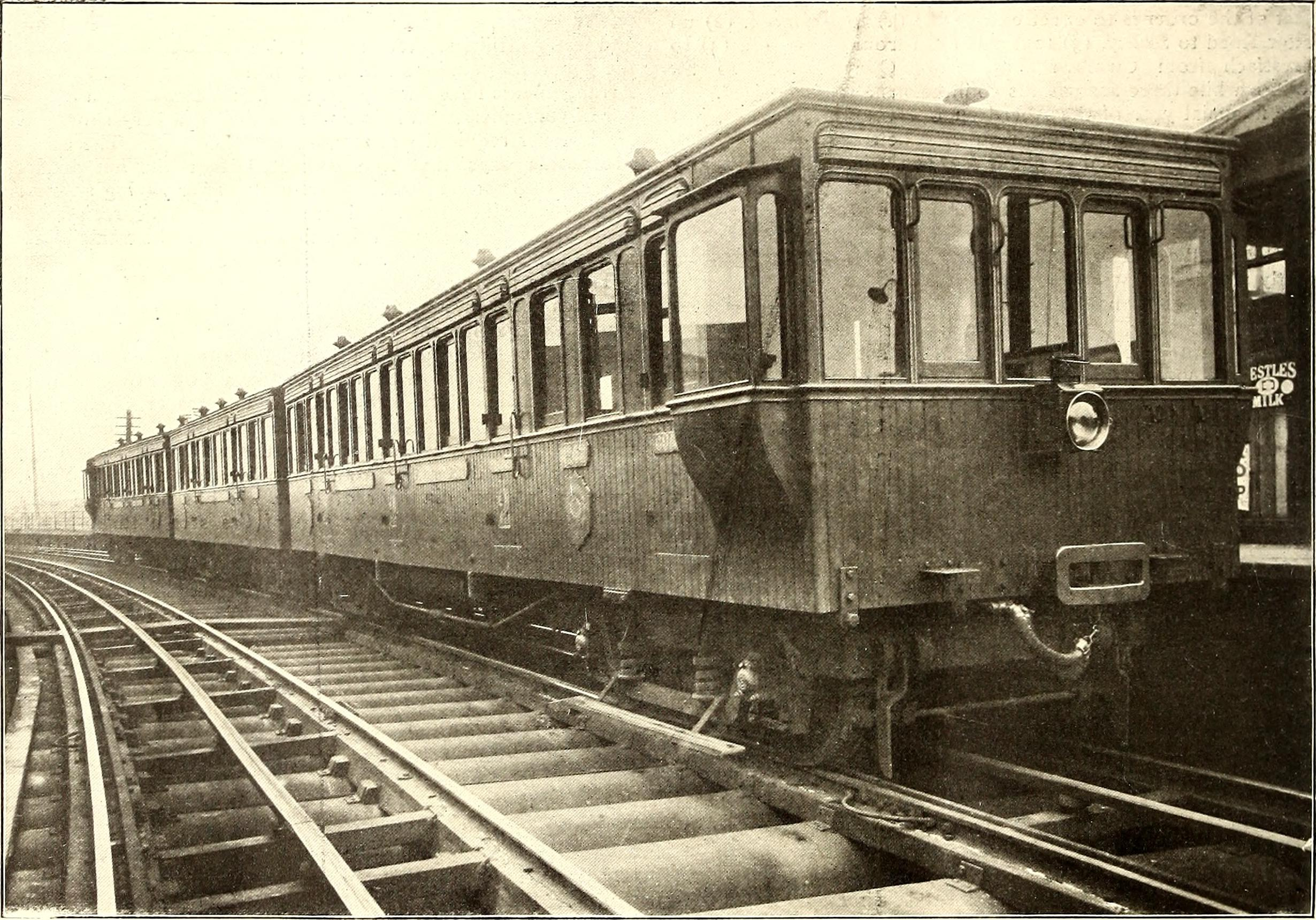
Photo of LOR rolling stock, from The Street Railway Journal (1902).

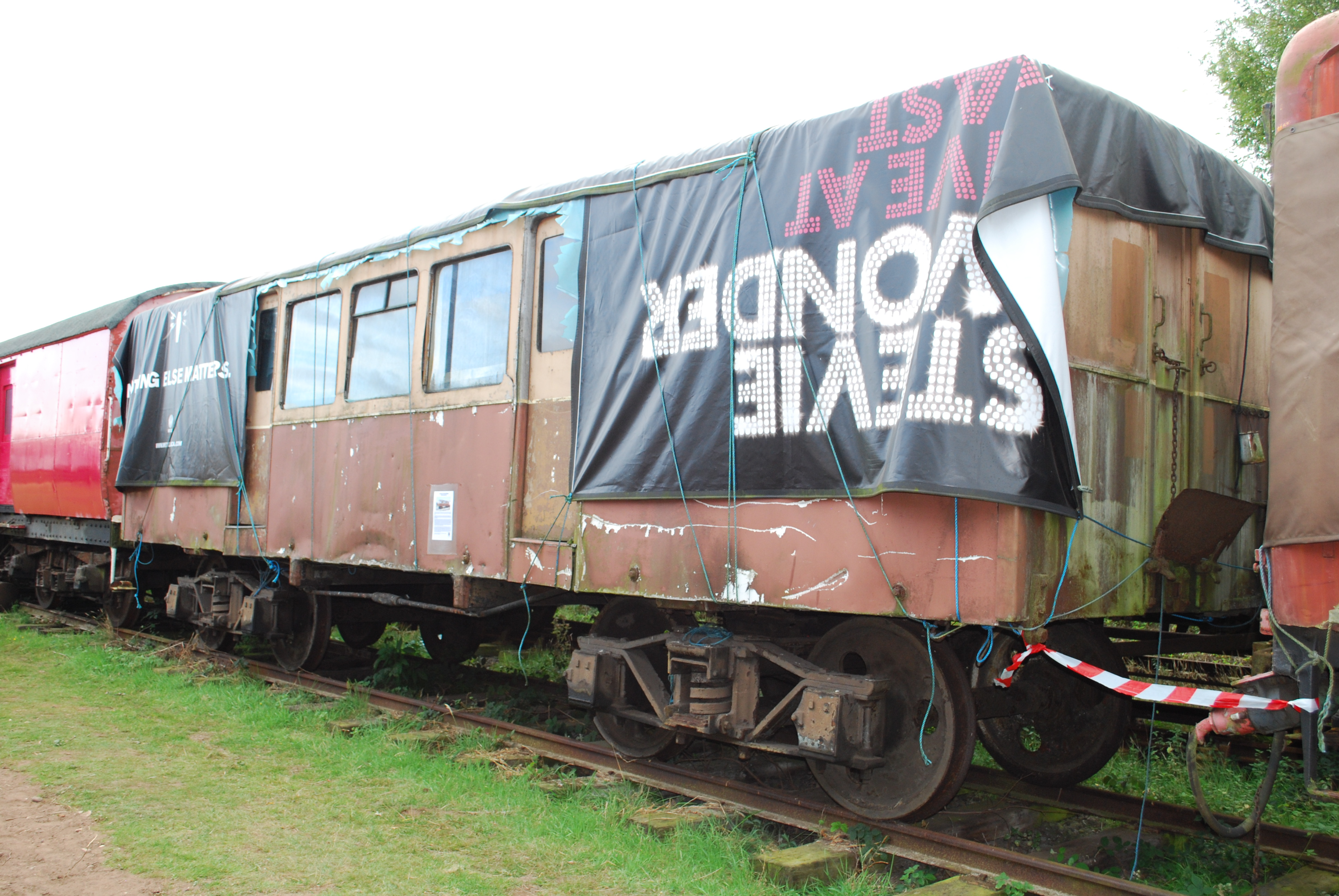
Liverpool Overhead Railway carriage in storage at the Electric Railway Museum, rebuilt in 1947.

The Liverpool Overhead Railway opened on 6 March 1893 with two-car electric multiple units, the first to operate in the world. Each lightweight car had a 60 hp (45 kW) motor that took power from a third rail. In 1902, these were replaced with two 100 hp (75 kW) motors, which reduced the travel time. After 1945, some trains were modernised, replacing the timber body with aluminium and plywood and fitting power operated sliding doors under control of the guard. The trains were all removed from service when the railway closed in 1956. An original example was retained by the Museum of Liverpool and an example of a modernised carriage was stored at the Electric Railway Museum, Warwickshire, now closed.

== Service ==
The Liverpool Overhead Railway was an elevated railway operating in and around the dockside of Liverpool that opened on 6 March 1893 with the first electric multiple units operating in the world. The railway opened with 15 two-car trains, built by Brown, Marshall & Co, each lightweight car with a 60 hp (45 kW) motor and 45 ft (14 m) long, 8 ft 6 in (2.59 m) wide with seating for 41 in second class and 16 in first. Power was provided by a third rail between the tracks and air brakes were fitted, the pressure topped up at terminus stations. In the early days, a single motor coach would run off-peak. Leather high-backed seating was provided in the first class compartment, while third class consisted of wooden seating in bays of six, with hanging straps for standees during peak times.

A further four 2-car trains were built in 1894; these were only 40 feet (12 m) long, followed by enough motor cars and trailers were built in 1896 to allow fifteen 2-car trains and eight 3-car trains to be formed. These newer motor cars were fitted with 70 hp (52 kW) motors. To meet competition from the electric tramways that offered a faster service, in 1902 the motor cars were fitted with two Dick, Kerr & Co. 100 hp (75 kW) motors, which reduced the travel time from end to end from 32 minutes to 20 minutes. At the same time, ten motor cars were widened to 9 ft 4 in (2.84 m) to increase accommodation.

Originally, first and second class accommodation was provided, but after the L&YR began running over the railway in 1905 this became first and third. The conductor rail was moved from the central position to outside the running rails at the same time. The two-car trains were lengthened to three-car with additional trailers built in 1916–1918. The cars were now arranged with transverse seating, the unpowered central coach was fitted with leather-covered seats for first class passengers; third class passengers had wooden seating. The motors were replaced in 1919 by 75 hp (56 kW) motors, and the travel time increased to 31 minutes.

In 1945–1947, a three car train was modernised, replacing the timber body with aluminium and plywood and fitting power operated sliding doors under control of the guard. New trains were considered too expensive so six more trains were rebuilt. The trains were all removed from service when the railway closed in 1956. An original example was retained by the Museum of Liverpool and an example of a modernised carriage is stored at the Electric Railway Museum, Warwickshire.
