= Lancashire and Yorkshire Railway =

Pre-1923 grouping British Railway company

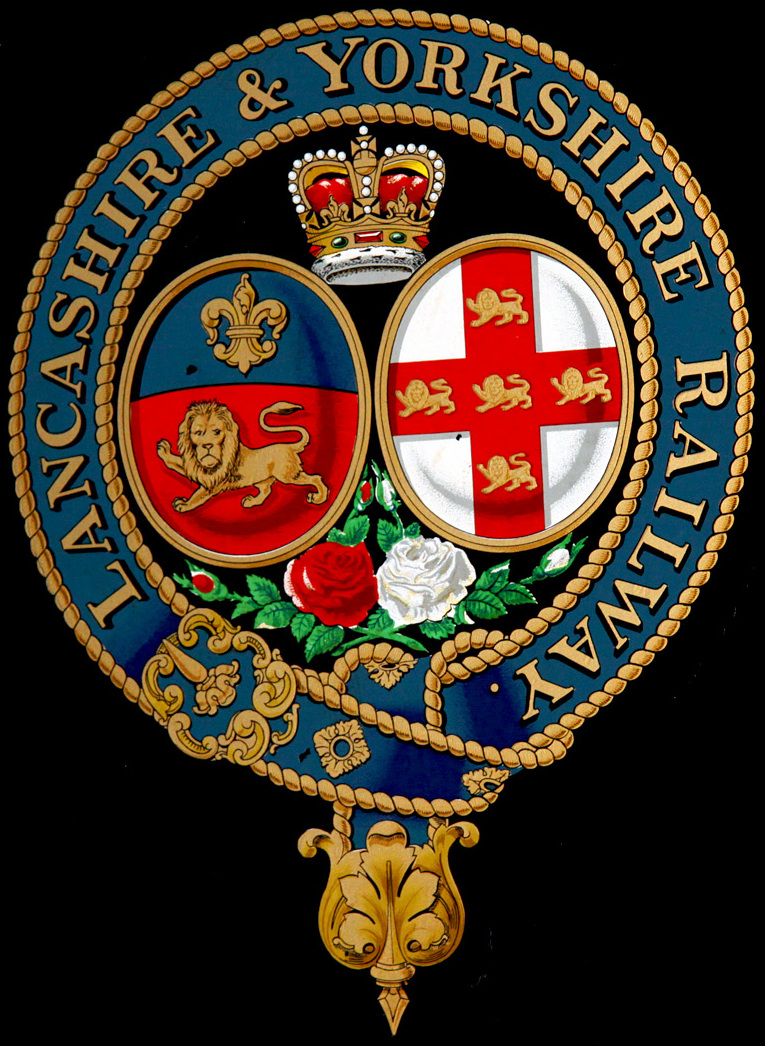

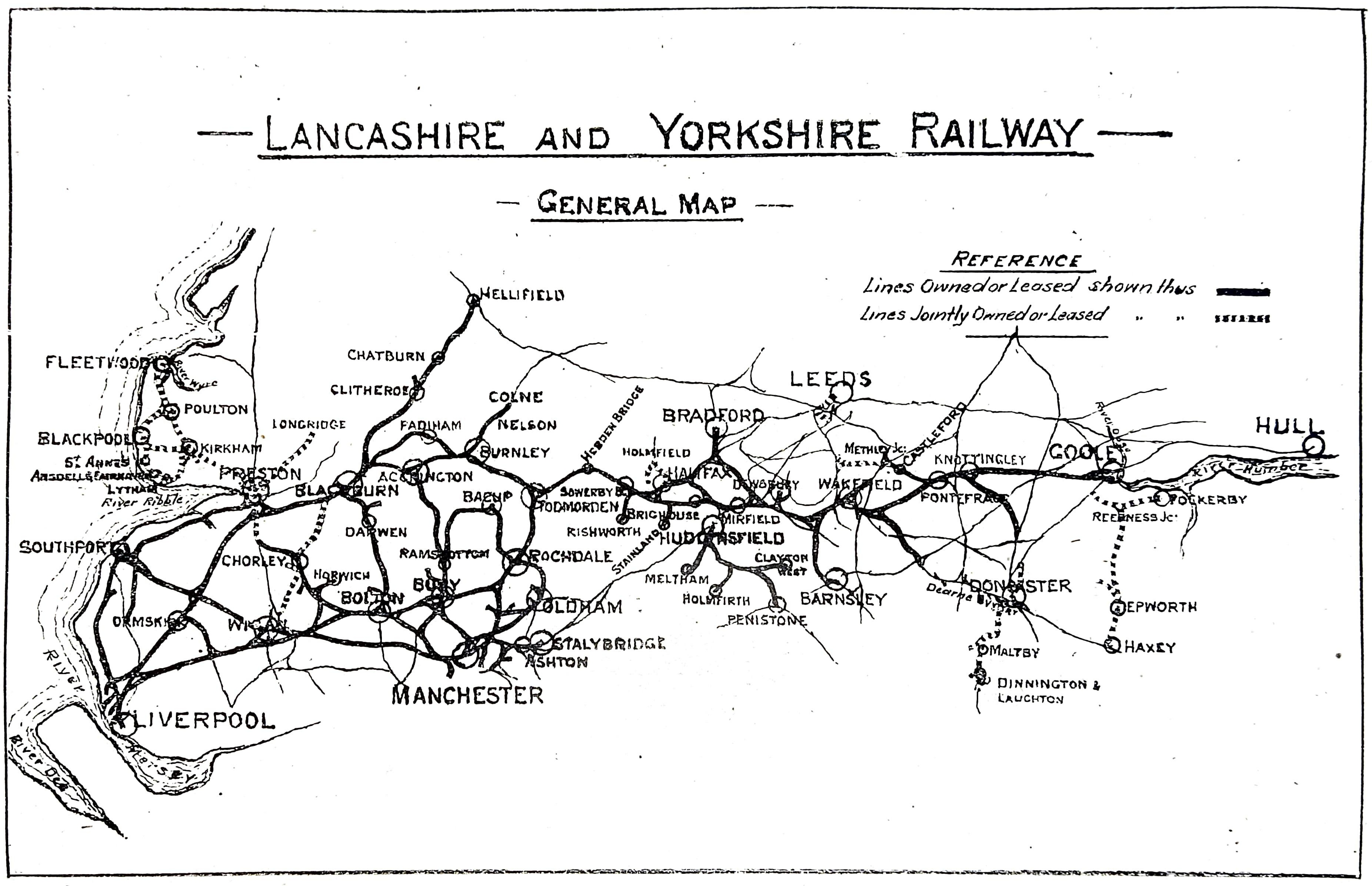
- 1920 map of the railway

Overview
- Headquarters: Manchester
- Reporting mark: LY
- Locale: Lancashire and Yorkshire
- Dates of operation: 9 July 1847; 179 years ago – 1 January 1922; 104 years ago
- Predecessor: Manchester and Leeds Railway
- Successor: London and North Western Railway; London, Midland and Scottish Railway

Technical
- Track gauge: 4 ft 8 1/2 in (1,435 mm) standard gauge
- Electrification: 600 V DC third rail 3.5 kV DC overhead 1,200 V DC side contact third rail
- Length: 601 miles 28 chains (967.8 km) (1919)
- Track length: 2,269 miles 36 chains (3,652.3 km) (1919)

The Lancashire and Yorkshire Railway (L&YR) was a major British railway company before the 1923 Grouping. It was incorporated in 1847 from an amalgamation of several existing railways. It was the third-largest railway system based in northern England (after the Midland and North Eastern Railways).

The intensity of its service was reflected in the 1,650 locomotives it owned – it was by far the most densely trafficked system in the British Isles with more locomotives per mile than any other company – and that one third of its 738 signal boxes controlled junctions averaging one every 3 1/2 miles (6 km). No two adjacent stations were more than 5 1/2 miles (9 km) apart and its 1,904 passenger services occupied 57 pages in Bradshaw, a number exceeded only by the Great Western Railway, the London and North Western Railway, and the Midland Railway. It was the first mainline railway to introduce electrification of some of its lines, and it also ran steamboat services across the Irish Sea and North Sea, being a bigger shipowner than any other British railway company.

It amalgamated with the London and North Western Railway on 1 January 1922. One year later, the merged company became the largest constituent of the London, Midland and Scottish Railway.

== History ==
Manchester and Leeds Railway Act (No. 3) 1847
- Act of Parliament
- Parliament of the United Kingdom
- Long title: An Act to enable the Manchester and Leeds Company to make certain Branches, Extensions, and other Works, and to alter the Name of the Company.
- Citation: 10 & 11 Vict. c. clxiii

Dates
- Royal assent: 9 July 1847

Text of statute as originally enacted

The L&YR was incorporated in 1847 by the Manchester and Leeds Railway Act (No. 3) 1847 (10 & 11 Vict. c. clxiii), being an amalgamation of several important lines, the chief of which was the Manchester and Leeds Railway (itself having been incorporated in 1836).

=== Constituent companies ===
The following companies, in order, were amalgamated into the L&YR. The dates shown are, in most cases, the acts of Parliament authorising the incorporation and amalgamation of each company. In a few instances the effective date is used.

- Manchester and Leeds Railway, 4 July 1836 – 9 July 1847
  - Manchester, Bolton & Bury Canal Navigation and Railway, 23 August 1831 – 18 July 1846
  - Huddersfield and Sheffield Junction Railway, 30 June 1845 – 27 July 1846, now the Penistone Line.
  - Liverpool and Bury Railway, 31 July 1845 – 27 July 1846
  - Preston and Wyre Railway, Harbour and Dock Company, 1 July 1839 – 3 August 1846 (joint LNWR from 28 July 1849, in proportion two-thirds L&YR, one-third LNWR)
    - Preston and Wyre Railway and Harbour Company, 3 July 1835 – 1 July 1839
  - West Riding Union Railways, 18 August 1846 – 17 November 1846
- Ashton, Stalybridge and Liverpool Junction Railway, 19 July 1844 – 9 July 1847
- Wakefield, Pontefract and Goole Railway, 31 July 1845 – 9 July 1847
- Manchester and Southport Railway, 22 July 1847 – 3 July 1854 (joint ELR)
- Liverpool, Crosby and Southport Railway, 2 July 1847 – 14 June 1855
- Blackburn Railway, 24 July 1851 – 12 July 1858 (joint ELR)
  - Bolton, Blackburn, Clitheroe and West Yorkshire Railway, 9 July 1847 – 24 July 1851
    - Blackburn, Darwen and Bolton Railway, 30 June 1845 – 9 July 1847
    - Blackburn, Clitheroe and North Western Junction Railway, 27 July 1846 – 9 July 1847
- Sheffield, Rotherham, Barnsley, Wakefield, Huddersfield and Goole Railway, 7 August 1846 – 2 August 1858 (acquired northern half of line)
- East Lancashire Railway, 21 July 1845 – 13 May 1859
  - Manchester, Bury and Rossendale Railway, 4 July 1844 – 21 July 1845
  - Blackburn, Burnley, Accrington and Colne Extension Railway, 30 June 1845 – 21 July 1845
  - Blackburn and Preston Railway, 6 June 1844 – 3 August 1846
  - Liverpool, Ormskirk and Preston Railway, 18 August 1846 – October 1846
- Fleetwood, Preston and West Riding Junction Railway, 27 July 1846 – 17 June 1866 (joint LNWR)
  - Preston and Longridge Railway, 14 July 1836 – 23 June 1856
- Blackpool and Lytham Railway, 17 May 1861 – 29 June 1871 (joint LNWR)
- Lancashire Union Railway, 25 July 1864 – 16 July 1883 (joint LNWR)
- North Union Railway, 22 May 1834 – 26 July 1889 (joint LNWR)
  - Wigan Branch Railway, 29 May 1830 – 22 May 1834
  - Preston and Wigan Railway, 22 April 1831 – 22 May 1834
  - Bolton and Preston Railway, 15 June 1837 – 10 May 1844
- Bury and Tottington District Railway, 2 August 1877 – 24 July 1888
- West Lancashire Railway, 14 August 1871 – 15 July 1897
- Liverpool, Southport and Preston Junction Railway, 7 August 1884 – 15 July 1897

=== Joint lines ===
The L&YR was a co-owner of several joint railways and joint stations. Besides those listed above, they included:

- Axholme Joint Railway (L&YR, NER)
- Halifax and Ovenden Junction Railway (GNR, L&YR)
- Halifax High Level Railway (GNR, L&YR)
- Huddersfield railway station (LNWR, L&YR)
- Knottingley railway station (GNR, L&YR)
- Leeds Central railway station (GNR, LNWR, L&YR, NER)
- Methley Joint Railway (GNR, L&YR, NER)
- South Yorkshire Joint Railway (GCR, GNR, L&YR, MR, NER)
- Wakefield Kirkgate railway station (GNR, L&YR)

Unless otherwise stated, the owning railways had equal shares. In addition, the L&YR had a one-third stake in the Dearne Valley Railway, the remaining two-thirds of which was owned by private shareholders.

=== The system ===
The system consisted of many branches and alternative routes, so that it is not easy to determine the location of its main line. For working purposes the railway was split into three divisions:

- Western Division:
  - Manchester to Blackpool and Fleetwood;
  - Manchester to Bolton, Wigan, Southport and Liverpool; and the direct line to Liverpool;
- East Lancashire or Central Division
  - Manchester to Oldham, Bury, Rochdale, Todmorden, Accrington, Burnley and Colne. It also included the connection to the LNWR at Stockport for through traffic to London.
- Eastern Division:
  - Todmorden to Halifax, Bradford, Leeds, Huddersfield, Wakefield, Normanton, Goole, and Doncaster.

Whereas there were various lines split between the Central and Western Divisions there was only one route connecting the Eastern and Central Divisions. This line cut through the Pennines between Lancashire and Yorkshire using a number of long tunnels, the longest of which was Summit Tunnel (2,885 yards (2,638 m) in length) near Rochdale. There were six other tunnels each more than 1,000 yards (900 m) long.

=== Manchester Victoria railway station ===
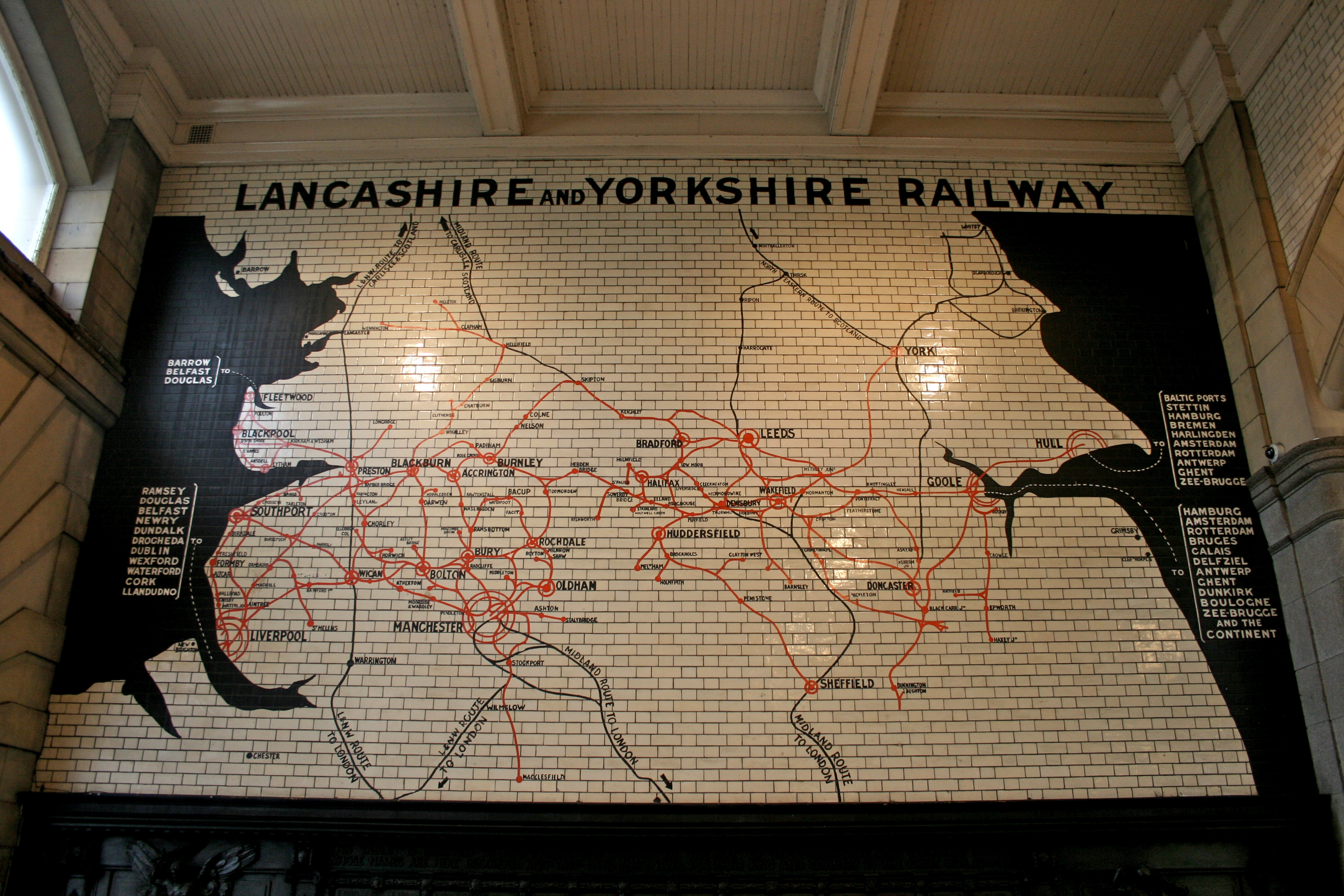
A map of the L&YR system forms part of the War Memorial at Manchester Victoria

Manchester Victoria railway station was one of the largest railway stations in the country at the time. It occupied 13 1/2 acres (55,000 m^{2}) and had 17 platforms with a total length of 9,332 feet (2,844 m). After the grouping, a structural change led platform 11 to run through and join with platform 3 in the LNWR's adjacent Exchange station; at 2,238 feet (682 m) between ramps it became the longest railway platform in Britain. Lately the station capacity has been reduced to two platforms for Metrolink trams, two bay platforms, and four through platforms under Manchester Arena, which now replaces a significant area once occupied by the station. The main façade and station building of the original Hunts Bank station still exist and are kept in relatively good condition.

=== Electrification ===
The L&YR was the first in the country to electrify a mainline route, and when amalgamated into the LNWR in 1922, the combined total length of the suburban lines in Liverpool and Manchester reached 46 miles (74 km), with the main principle routes being :

- Liverpool Exchange – Southport and Crossens: 22 March 1904
- Liverpool – Aintree (two routes): July and December 1906
- Southport – Meols Cop: 1909
- Aintree – Ormskirk: 1913
- Bury Bolton Street - Holcombe Brook: 1913 (Converted to 3rd Rail in 1918)
- Manchester Victoria - Bury Bolton Street: 1916

==== Liverpool to Southport ====
The first route to be electrified was between Liverpool Exchange and Southport. The primary reasoning for this was due to the line because increasingly traffic heavy, with up to 36 through and 40 local trains daily, with the terminating facilities at Liverpool Exchange no longer able to cope with any more additional traffic. Alongside this, the completion of the electrification of the Liverpool Tramways Company's lines in 1901 also saw passenger numbers decrease, and such the decision to electrify the route was put forward as early as 1902 by the recently appointed General Manager John Audley Frederick Aspinall.

It was originally intended for the services on the line to be mixed traffic, making use of both current steam traction and the to-be-built electric stock, with single coach electric units being considered. This would ultimately be rejected, with all passenger services to be operated by electric stock. Come October 1902, the final decisions had been made, and it was decided that Dick, Kerr & Co. would be the ones to undertake the electrification of the whole route, with the overall estimated cost coming in at £286,724 for the full Southport to Liverpool line. In 1903, the L&YR Board decided that the line between Southport and Crossens would also be electrified, due to the large residential population along the route.

The line would first be electrified first using a fourth rail system, similar to what had been used on the tube railways in London, with the positive rail being energised at 650 Volts D.C. (Then trains themselves would only require 600). As standard, a fourth rail would be laid down the middle for the return current, although this would be later removed. The L&YR would have a power station built between Hightown and Formby by the River Alt, referred to as "Power House", in order to provide the necessary power required for the full route. Four sub-stations would also be constructed, one at Power House itself, then at Bank Hall, Seaforth and Litherland, and Birkdale. It has been noted that the speed at which the route was electrified was remarkably quick, with partial services beginning on 22 March 1904, with full services starting on 13 May, roughly two years after the final decisions had been made.

==== Extensions to the Liverpool and Southport line ====
In 1906, the old North Mersey Branch to Aintree would be electrified, with services beginning on 1 June. In the meanwhile, the line from Aintree to Kirkdale was also being electrified, with services beginning in December of the same year. On the line between Crossens and Southport, electric services would reach Meols Cop on 15 February 1909, with only one platform being electrified as to permit trains to pull in and reverse out again to either Southport and Crossens, with the aid of the triangle junction just West of Meols Cop, which itself would see and new workshop built in the middle of it in 1912, coming into use the following year. On the 1 October 1909, electrification on the North Mersey Branch would reach Maghull, with services reaching Town Green on 3 July 1911, before finally reaching Ormskirk on 12 July 1913. A new terminus station for the North Mersey Branch would open to the public in 1914, referred to as Gladstone Dock, not to be confused with the later Liverpool Overhead Railway station of the same name, using the Lightweight Stock that was now surplus due to the withdrawal of the Southport to Dingle services. The station would not be profitable, due to passengers favouring the nearby and more convenient Seaforth Sands railway station, and was closed in 1924 by the LMS.

==== Liverpool Overhead Railway connection ====
By 2 July 1905, a new connecting route from Seaforth and Litherland to the Liverpool Overhead Railway at Seaforth Sands railway station was opened, permitting the L&YR to operate services from Southport to Dingle, with this service beginning on 2 February 1906, running hourly. Whilst the trains of the LOR would not run beyond Seaforth and Litherland, specially laid on services did run up to Aintree, in order to serve the Grand National at Aintree.

==== Manchester to Bury ====
Due to the notable success of the electrification in the Liverpool area, the L&YR moved to see the lines it owned around Manchester similarly electrified, although only two lines would have this done so, the Bury Line, and notably short branch to Holcombe Brook. The Bury Line would be electrified during the Holcombe Brook experiment, although to the L&YR's now standard fourth rail system. Although unlike the other systems, the rail would be energised to 1200 V D.C., which necessitated the collector shoes to make contact on the side of the rail instead. Alongside this, similar to the Southport lines, the fourth rail would be removed. A power station would be constructed at Clifton Junction, although this would close in 1933, with power taken from the National Grid. The line re-opened with electric services on 7 April 1916.

==== Holcombe Brook Branch ====
The small branch up to Holcombe Brook would be the first line electrified in 1913, although this was due to Dick, Kerr & Co. wishing to experiment with a new electrification system much different from that seen in Liverpool at their expense, as they had a potential contract in South America that could benefit from this. This would be in the form of overhead lines, energised to 3500 V D.C., and a notably simple catenary construction. Service would begin in July 1913, and last until 1918, when the line would be converted to a similar system used on the then newly electrified Bury line.

==== Rolling Stock ====
For the newly electrified lines in Liverpool, and later Manchester, new bespoke stock was constructed. One notable feature of most stock on the Liverpool lines is that due to the incredibly wide loading-gauge of the lines out of Liverpool Exchange, stock was able to be built to 10 ft (3 m) in width, which not only gave them a very distinct look, but also made them the widest stock built in the UK before or since.. Stock on the Manchester lines would be built to the standard UK loading gauge.. All stock would be painted in the L&YR's standard coaching stock livery buff and purple-brown.

=== Livery ===
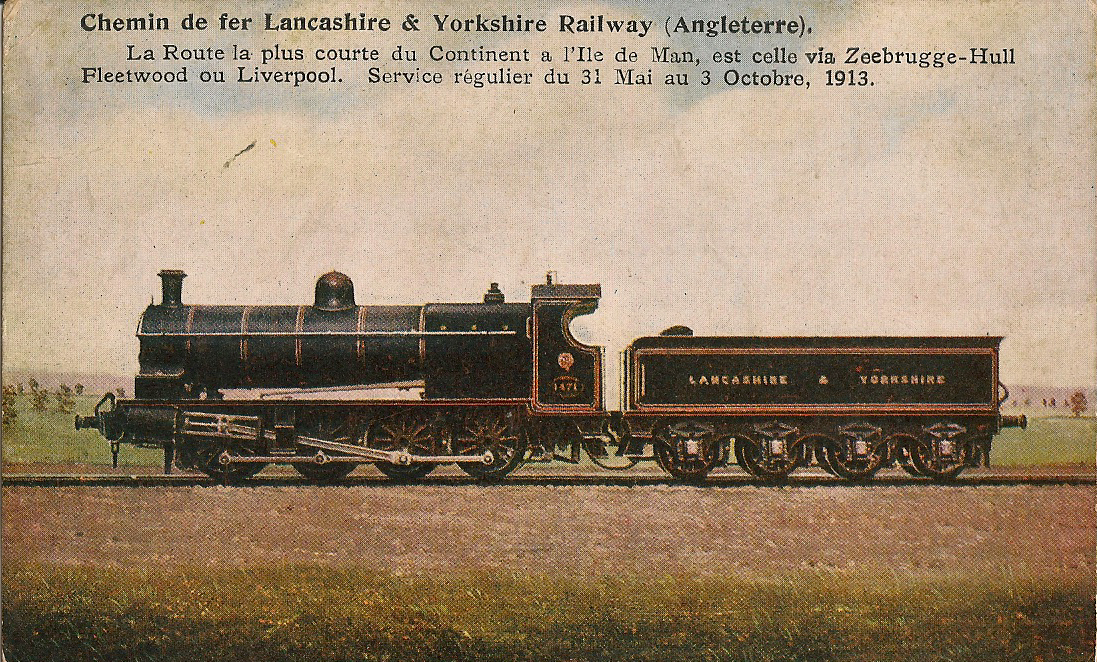
L&YR 0-8-0 Tender Engine on a period post card

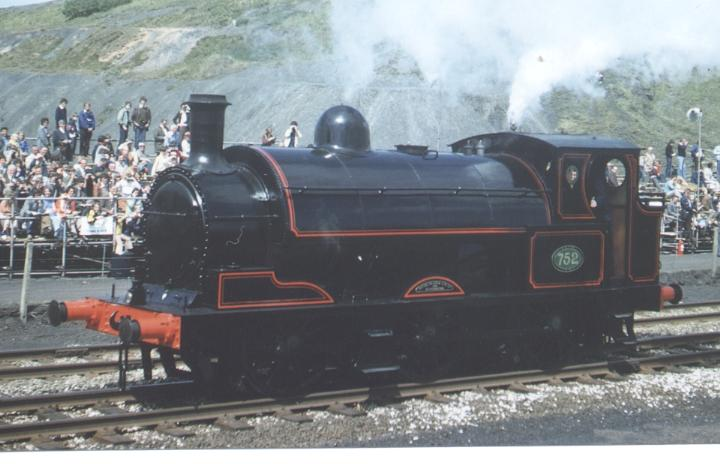
L&YR Aspinall 0-6-0 ST No. 752 at Rainhill in 1980 showing the LYR freight loco colours of black with red lining

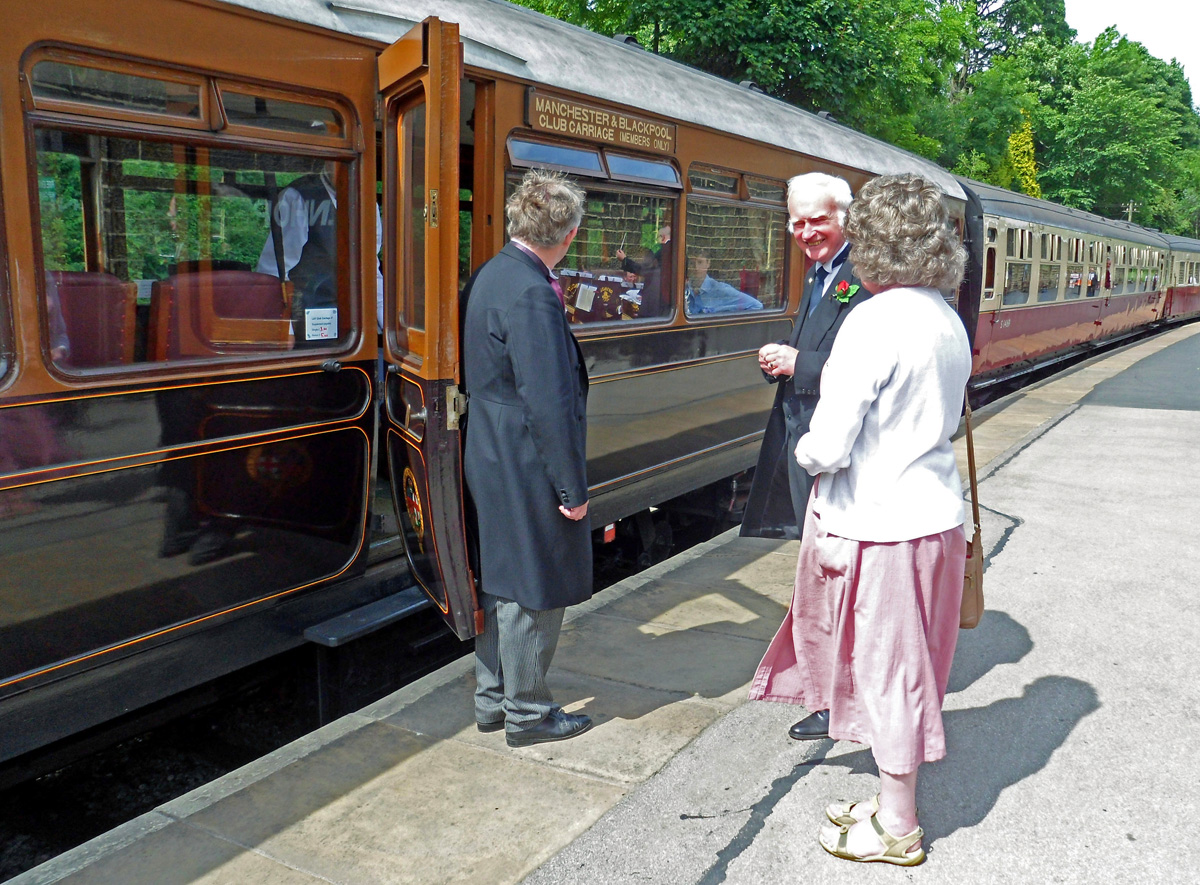
L&YR Blackpool–Manchester Club saloon of 1912 in contemporary colours

Locomotives of the Lancashire and Yorkshire Railway were originally painted dark green with ornate brasswork and copper-capped chimneys. Lining was black and white. In 1876 the dark green was changed to a light green and goods engines were painted plain black. 1878 saw the goods locomotives also appearing in light green. This livery was discontinued from 1883 when all locomotives were painted black. Lining was red and white for passenger locomotives and, if present, red only for goods locomotives.

Passenger coaching stock was originally painted teak, changing in 1875 to an overall light brown. In 1879 a decision was made to use 'a little brighter shade'. Finally in June 1881 it was announced that the lower panels were to be painted 'lake colour'. Between 1896 and 1914 the upper panels became buff with the lower in purple-brown, ends were dark brown. Roofs were normally dark grey but some did appear in red oxide.

Wagons were unpainted until 1902 except for the ironwork which was black. After 1902 it was painted dark grey. The graphical symbol of an inverted solid triangle within a circle was replaced in 1902–03 with the letters LY. Brake vans were black and special traffic wagons were painted in various colours, such as red for gunpowder, white for fish, and pale blue for butter.

The football team of the L&YR Carriage and Wagon works at Newton Heath, Manchester, evolved into Manchester United F.C.

=== Post-grouping history ===
On 25 March 1921, the L&YR and LNWR agreed terms under which the two railways would amalgamate. Before this could occur, the Railways Act 1921 became law on 19 August 1921, under which the L&YR and LNWR would be forced to amalgamate on 1 January 1923 with each other and with other railways, such as the Midland Railway and the Caledonian Railway. The Act included provisions for two or more railways to amalgamate voluntarily before 1923; and the L&YR and LNWR took the opportunity to implement their March 1921 agreement, and on 1 January 1922 both railways were dissolved and a new company was formed, which was also named the London and North Western Railway; its board of twenty directors included six from the former L&YR. The 1923 Grouping duly occurred one years later, which involved the expanded LNWR forming part of the new London Midland and Scottish Railway (LMS). The general manager, secretary and chief mechanical engineer positions of the expanded company were taken by L&YR employees. Ex-L&YR lines formed the core of the LMS's Central Division.

The LMS did little to develop the former L&YR routes, which in many places ran parallel to ex-LNWR or ex-Midland routes now forming part of the same network. Nationalisation followed in 1948 followed by a period of rationalisation and modernisation. The L&YR system has survived largely intact, although the following routes have been closed, many within the L&YR's old East Lancashire division:

- Bury to Manchester (converted to Manchester Metrolink operation in 1992)
- Bury to Clifton Junction, closed 1966
- Bury/Radcliffe to Bolton, closed 1970
- Bury to Rochdale, closed to regular passenger traffic 1970, but now partly preserved as the East Lancashire Railway heritage railway line
- Bury to Accrington/Bacup, closed to regular passenger traffic in 1966, but now partly preserved as the East Lancashire Railway heritage railway line
- Bury to Holcombe Brook, fully closed 1963
- Rochdale to Bacup, fully closed 1967
- Rochdale to Manchester via Oldham – The Oldham Loop, now converted to Manchester Metrolink operation
- Blackburn to Burnley via Padiham – The North Lancs or Great Harwood Loop, closed 1964
- Blackburn to Chorley, closed 1960
- Preston to Southport, closed 1964
- Preston to Longridge, closed 1930
- Southport to Altcar, closed 1952

=== The routes today ===
Most ex-L&YR routes are now operated by Northern. Manchester Victoria station has been rebuilt in a more modest form and retains the former terminal building. The Caldervale Line, as named by West Yorkshire Metro, is also operated by Northern and uses a large part of the former L&YR.

== Accidents and incidents ==
- The Helmshore rail accident on 4 September 1860 saw 11 people killed and 77 injured when the rear portion of a Lancashire & Yorkshire Railway passenger excursion train became detached and ran back down the line where it collided with an oncoming passenger excursion train.
- The Burscough Junction crash occurred on 15 January 1880 at the Burscough Junction station on the Liverpool to Preston line, resulting in nine fatalities.
- A passenger train ran into a goods train near Mosesgate on 27 October 1880. Several passengers were injured and about a dozen carriages and a number of wagons were damaged.
- An excursion train was in collision with a West Lancashire Railway passenger train at Preston Junction, Lancashire on 3 August 1896 due to the driver of the excursion train misreading signals. One person was killed and seven were injured.
- A passenger train was derailed on 15 July 1903 at Waterloo station, then in Lancashire (now Merseyside) caused by a broken spring and spring bridle on the locomotive, while negotiating a 23-chain-radius (460 m) curve at speed. Seven people were killed and 116 were injured.
- An express passenger train collided with a light engine at Sowerby Bridge, Yorkshire on 22 October 1903 due to a signalman's error. A third train collided with the wreckage at low speed. One person was killed.
- A collision between a London and North Western Railway (LNWR) empty stock train and a passenger train at Huddersfield, Yorkshire on 21 April 1905 killed two people. The driver of the LNWR train had overrun signals, but fatigue was a contributory factor.
- The Hall Road rail accident at Blundellsands in what is now Merseyside on 27 July 1905 saw 20 killed and 48 injured when two Lancashire & Yorkshire Railway electric passenger trains collided due to human error on the part of a signalman and a train driver.
- Two locomotives were shunted into a siding at Hindley & Blackrod Junction, Lancashire on 22 January 1909, but one of them remained foul of the main line. A passenger train collided with it, killing one person and injuring 33.
- A passenger train was derailed on the Charlestown Curve when the track spread under it on 21 June 1912. Four people were killed and twelve were injured.
- A freight train became divided on 28 October 1913. The rear portion ran back and was derailed at Lockwood, Yorkshire.
- On 18 March 1915, an express passenger train overran signals and was in a rear-end collision with an empty stock train at Smithy Bridge, Lancashire. Four people were killed and 33 were injured.
- A viaduct at Penistone, Yorkshire collapsed on 2 February 1916 due to subsidence. A locomotive was on the bridge at the time, but its crew had time to escape before it fell.
- A freight train became divided at Pendlebury, Lancashire. The rear portion was too heavy for the banking locomotive to hold, and it was pushed back downhill and derailed by catch points, as were the wagons.
- The Lostock Junction train collision near Bolton on 17 July 1920 saw four fatalities and 148 injured as the result of a near head-on collision between two Lancashire & Yorkshire Railway passenger trains due to a signal having been passed at danger

== Locomotives ==
The Lancashire and Yorkshire Railway locomotive works were originally at Miles Platting, Manchester. From 1889 they were at Horwich.

During its existence the L&YR stationed its locomotives at around sixty different depots, some of which belonged to another railway, or were shared. Not all were open at the same time: small depots were occasionally closed, with their duties being moved either to another existing depot, or to a new larger depot. By the early 20th century there were 32 depots, of which 27 were owned outright, three were jointly owned with the LNWR, and two belonged to another railway. Each was given a code number:

1. Newton Heath
2. Low Moor
3. Sowerby Bridge
4. Leeds
5. Mirfield
6. Wakefield
7. Normanton
8. Barnsley
9. Knottingley
10. Goole
11. Doncaster (Great Northern Railway)
12. Hull (North Eastern Railway)
13. Agecroft
14. Bolton
15. Horwich
16. Wigan
17. Southport
18. Sandhills
19. Aintree
20. Bury
21. Bacup
22. Accrington
23. Rose Grove
24. Colne
25. Lower Darwen
26. Hellifield
27. Lostock Hall
28. Chorley
29. Ormskirk
30. Fleetwood (joint with LNWR)
31. Blackpool Talbot Road (joint with LNWR)
32. Blackpool Central (joint with LNWR)

== Surviving stock ==
Surviving coaching stock of L&YR origin go as far as 1878, with Directors Saloon No. 1 being privately preserved at the Keighley & Worth Valley Railway. Multiple coaches are preserved by Lancashire and Yorkshire Railway Trust, at the Keighley & Worth Valley Railway, 6-wheel 5-comp third No. 1507, Blackpool Club Car No. 47, 6-wheel 4-comp First No. 279 and Brake third No. 1474.

Many L&YR carriages, that were sold to the Barry Railway Company also survive, one being a birdcage brake from 1882. A dynamometer car also survives at the Midland Rail Centre in Butterley.

Mostly covered goods vans survive in the form of L&YR goods stock, some of these vans also passed into Cadbury ownership for use at Bournville. A brake van also survives at the Kent & East Sussex Railway and the body of a CCT van at the Cambrian Heritage Railways in Oswestry.

== Shipping ==
The L&YR had the largest ship fleet of all the pre-grouping railway companies. In 1902 the assets of the Drogheda Steam Packet Company were acquired for the sum of £80,000 (equivalent to £8,500,000 in 2025). In 1905 they took over the Goole Steam Shipping Company.

By 1913 they owned 26 vessels, with another two under construction, plus a further five under joint ownership with the London and North Western Railway. The L&YR ran steamers between Liverpool and Drogheda, Hull and Zeebrugge, and between Goole and many continental ports including Amsterdam, Copenhagen, Hamburg, and Rotterdam. The jointly owned vessels provided services between Fleetwood, Belfast and Derry.

== See also ==
- John Hargreaves Jnr
- Locomotives of the Lancashire and Yorkshire Railway

== Bibliography ==
- Awdry, C. (1990). Encyclopaedia of British Railway Companies. Wellingborough: Patrick Stephens Ltd. ISBN 978-1-85260-049-5.
- Beaumont, Martin (2015). Sir John Hawkshaw 1811–1891. Lancashire & Yorkshire Railway Society. ISBN 978-0-9559467-7-6.
- Blakemore, Michael (1984). The Lancashire and Yorkshire Railway. Ian Allan. ISBN 0-7110-1401-9.
- Casserley, H.C. (April 1968). Britain's Joint Lines. Shepperton: Ian Allan. ISBN 0-7110-0024-7. 469 CEX 468.
- Coates, Noel (1997) 150 Years of the Lancashire & Yorkshire Railway, Hawkshill Publishing, ISBN 1-900349-11-6
- Earnshaw, Alan (1992) The Lancashire & Yorkshire Railway: Then & Now, Ian Allan, ISBN 0-7110-2058-2
- Forbes, N.N.; Felton, B.J.; Rush, R.W. (1976). The Electric Line of the Lancashire and Yorkshire Railway (1 ed.). Electric Railway Society. SBN 855340142.
- Haigh, A (1978) Railways in West Yorkshire, Dalesman Books, ISBN 0-85206-459-4
- Haws, Duncan (1993). Merchant Fleets – Britain's Railway Steamers – Eastern & North Western + Zeeland and Stena. Hereford: TCL Publications. ISBN 978-0-946378-22-7.
- Littleworth, Chris (2002). Signal Boxes on Lancashire and Yorkshire Railway Lines - North-East Lancashire. Signalling Record Society. ISBN 978-1-873228-21-0.
- Littleworth, Chris (2013). Signal Boxes on Lancashire and Yorkshire Railway Lines - North and West of Manchester: Part One. Lancashire & Yorkshire Railway Society. ISBN 978-0-9559467-5-2.
- Littleworth, Chris (2014). Signal Boxes on Lancashire and Yorkshire Railway Lines - North and West of Manchester: Part Two. Lancashire & Yorkshire Railway Society. ISBN 978-0-9559467-6-9.
- Marshall, John (1969). The Lancashire and Yorkshire Railway, Volume 1. Newton Abbot: David & Charles. ISBN 978-0-7153-4352-4.
- Marshall, John (1970). The Lancashire and Yorkshire Railway, Volume 2. Newton Abbot: David & Charles. ISBN 978-0-7153-4906-9.
- Marshall, John (1972). The Lancashire and Yorkshire Railway, Volume 3. Newton Abbot: David & Charles. ISBN 978-0-7153-5320-2.
- Mason, Eric (1975) [1954]. The Lancashire & Yorkshire Railway in the Twentieth Century (2nd ed.). Shepperton: Ian Allan. ISBN 978-0-7110-0656-0.
- Nock, O.S. (1969) The Lancashire and Yorkshire Railway – A Concise History, Ian Allan, ISBN 0-7110-0130-8
- Paget-Tomlinson, E.W. (2006). The Illustrated History of Canal & River Navigations. Landmark countryside collection. Ashbourne: Landmark. ISBN 978-1-84306-207-3.
- Reed, M.C. (1996). The London & North Western Railway. Penryn: Atlantic Transport Publishers. ISBN 0-906899-66-4.
- Rennison, Robert William (1996). Civil Engineering Heritage. Thomas Telford. ISBN 978-0-7277-2518-9.
- Wells, Jeffrey (1995). An Illustrated Historical Survey of the Railways in and Around Bury. Challenger Publications. ISBN 1-899624-29-5.
