= Waterloo railway station (Merseyside) =

Railway station in Merseyside, England

Waterloo (Merseyside)
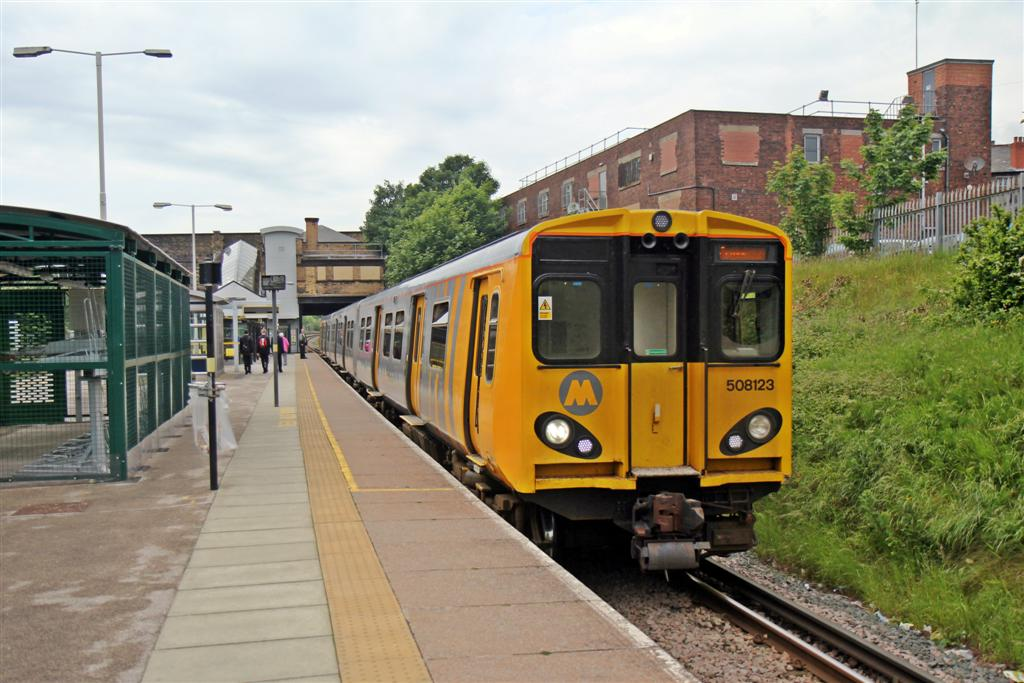
- A Merseyrail Class 508 at the station.

General information
- Location: Waterloo, Sefton; England
- Coordinates: 53.4749°N 3.0256°W
- Grid reference: SJ320980
- Manager: Merseyrail
- Transit authority: Merseytravel
- Platforms: 2

Other information
- Station code: WLO
- Fare zone: C3
- Classification: DfT category E

History
- Original company: Liverpool, Crosby and Southport Railway
- Pre-grouping: Lancashire and Yorkshire Railway
- Post-grouping: London, Midland and Scottish Railway

Key dates
- 24 July 1848: Opened as Waterloo
- 1 October 1850: Extension to Liverpool opened
- 24 July 1881: Station resited
- 14 May 1984: Renamed Waterloo (Merseyside)

Passengers
- 2021/22: ▲1.238 million
- 2022/23: ▲1.324 million
- 2023/24: ▲1.435 million
- 2024/25: ▲1.509 million
- 2025/26: ▲1.640 million
Location
Notes
- Passenger statistics from the Office of Rail and Road

Waterloo railway station is a railway station serving the town of Waterloo in Merseyside, England, on the Northern Line of the Merseyrail network.

== History ==
Waterloo railway station opened on 24 July 1848 as the original southern terminus of the Liverpool, Crosby and Southport Railway (LC&SR) when it opened its line from here to Southport Eastbank Street.

The terminus was located on the north side of South Road and an engine shed was located a short distance to the south of the station on the seaward side of the line.

A correspondent writing in the Liverpool Mercury in 1849 commented that the station had "a platform with an ample shed that were well built, admirable and worthy of the importance of the line", the facilities had improved "strikingly" since opening and it now had "good waiting rooms, comfortable furniture and a well arranged pay office" (presumably the booking office), there was even a temporary refreshment shed with genuine Eccles cakes.

Unfortunately this admirable situation did not prevail for long, another correspondent in the Liverpool Mercury in 1855 complained that the "waiting room had been dismantled of its furniture", had its "floor covering removed" and become a "neglected spot" frequented by porters and others.

Whilst the station was the southern terminus of the railway a horsedrawn omnibus service was operated to Tithebarn Street in Liverpool city centre. 74 trips were run each day with an average of 14 passengers per journey. When the LC&SR opened a booking office in Dale Street the journeys were extended to there.

When the line was extended south towards Liverpool on 1 October 1850 a level crossing was installed at South Road and the engine shed was relocated to the east side of the line just north of South Road.

The original station site became a goods and mineral depot, there was a goods shed and a five-ton crane. The goods yard closed on 27 November 1967.

The station was re-sited to the south side of road on 24 July 1881, the level crossing being replaced by an overbridge with the station entrance on the bridge. There is a wide island platform with waiting rooms, at the Liverpool end of the platform is a footbridge giving access from both sides.

The station was renamed Waterloo (Merseyside) on 14 May 1984.

In 1850 the LC&SR had been authorised to lease, sell or transfer itself to the L&YR and on 14 June 1855 the L&YR purchased and took over the LC&SR.

The Lancashire and Yorkshire Railway amalgamated with the London and North Western Railway on 1 January 1922 and in turn was Grouped into the London, Midland and Scottish Railway in 1923. Nationalisation followed in 1948.

In January 1977, Merseyside Passenger Transport Executive extended the railway station to an adjacent turning roundabout for local buses, named Waterloo Interchange. Local bus services were timed to call at the Interchange with the arrival and departure of Merseyrail services to and from Liverpool. This was the largest such scheme in Merseyside, similar interchange facilities were provided at Kirkby railway station in 1980. These arrangements lasted until 25 October 1986, after which bus services were deregulated and all bus/rail coordination was abandoned.

In 1978 the station became part of the Merseyrail network's Northern Line (operated by British Rail until privatised in 1995).

=== Accidents and incidents ===
On 15 July 1903, a Lancashire and Yorkshire Railway passenger train entered the station at excessive speed and was derailed. Seven people were killed and 116 were injured.

== Facilities ==
The station is staffed 15 minutes before the first service and 15 minutes after the last service. There is platform CCTV, shelters and a booking office. A self-serve ticket machine is also provided in the booking hall. There are departure and arrival screens on the platform for passenger information. The station has secure storage for 30 cycles. The station is fully wheelchair accessible: access to the platforms is via steps or a lift from the ticket office. There is another entry point by means of a ramp from the bus station across South Road, although this has been closed for several years. The station also connects with local bus services.

== Services ==
Trains run northbound to Southport and southbound to Liverpool Central at 15 minute frequencies on Mondays to Saturdays. On Sundays, they run every 30 minutes.

Preceding station	National Rail	Following station
Blundellsands & Crosby towards Southport	Merseyrail; Northern Line	Seaforth & Litherland towards Liverpool Central
	Historical railways	
Crosby towards Southport	Lancashire and Yorkshire Railway; Liverpool, Crosby and Southport Railway (until 1850)	Terminus
Crosby towards Southport	Lancashire and Yorkshire Railway; Liverpool, Crosby and Southport Railway (from 1850)	Seaforth

== Gallery ==
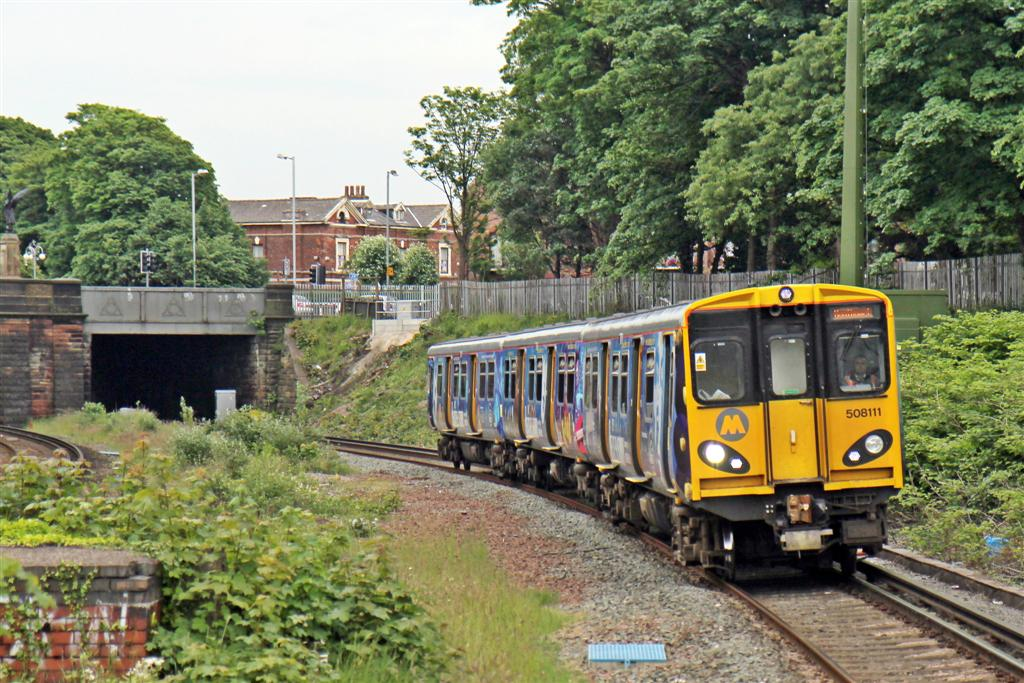
A Merseyrail Class 508 approaches the station, from Liverpool.

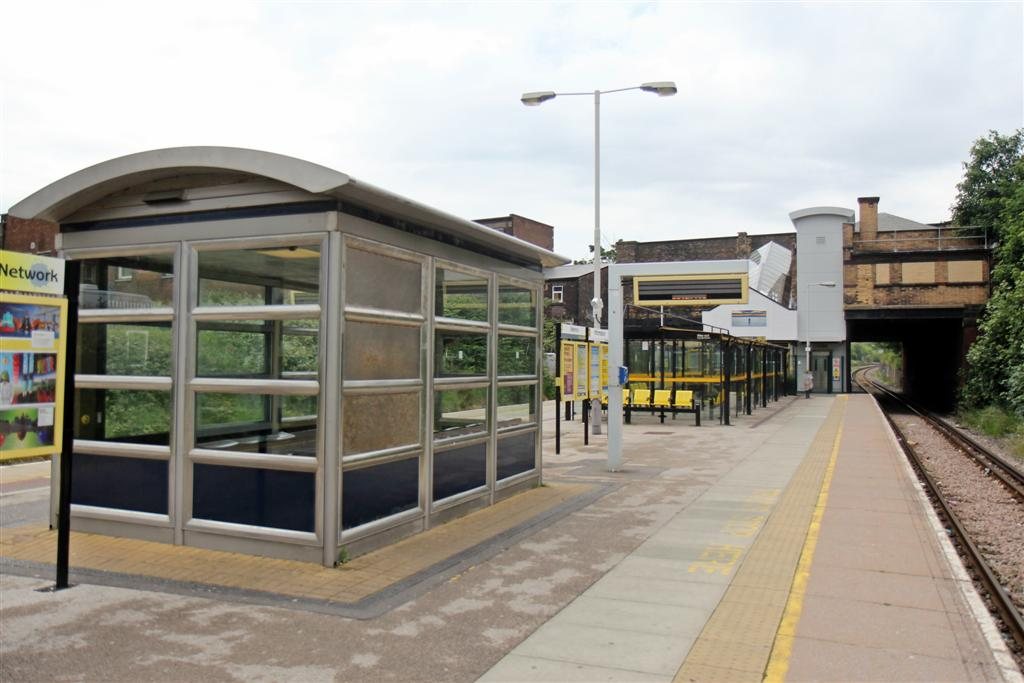
Looking towards the station entrance, from the platform.

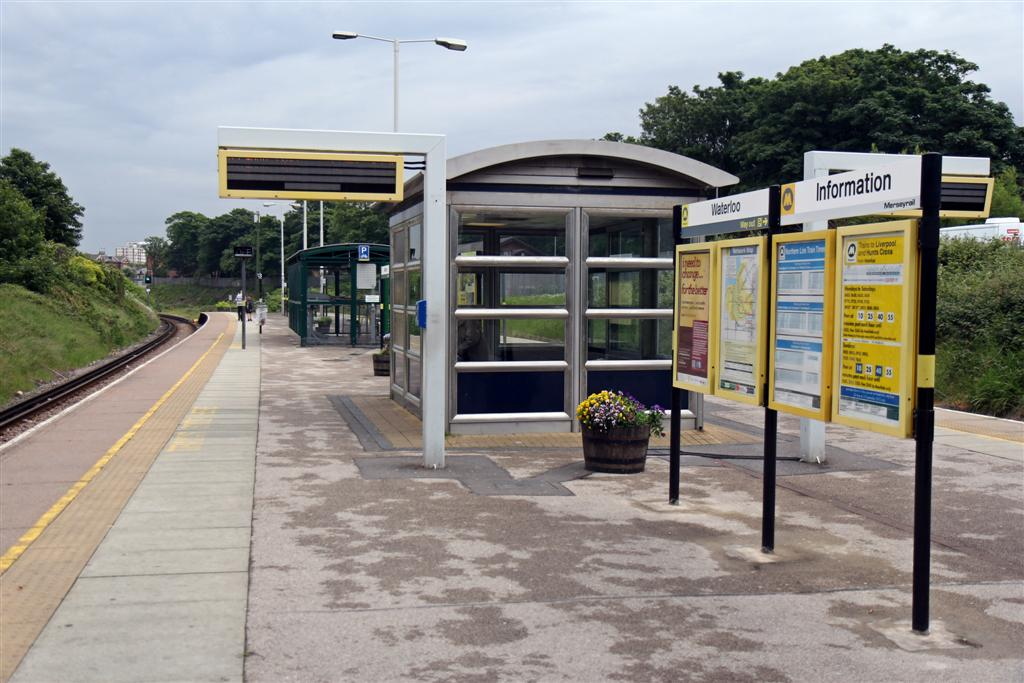
Platform buildings and furniture at the station.

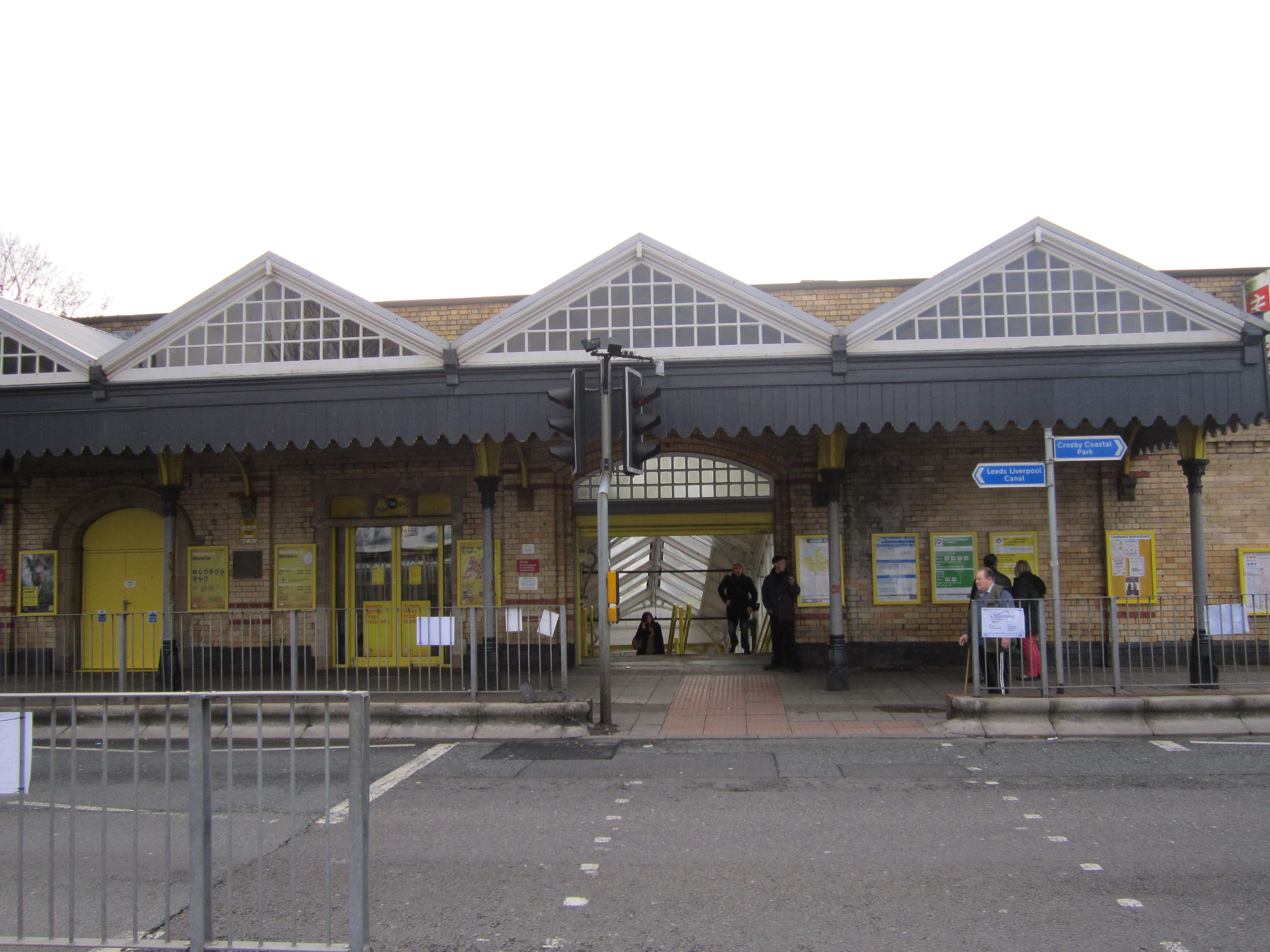
The entrance to the station, from the road.

== Bibliography ==
- Awdry, Christopher (1990). Encyclopaedia of British Railway Companies. Sparkford: Patrick Stephens Ltd. ISBN 1-8526-0049-7. OCLC 19514063. CN 8983.
- Clinker, C. R. (October 1978). Clinker's Register of Closed Passenger Stations and Goods Depots in England, Scotland and Wales 1830–1977. Bristol: Avon-Anglia Publications & Services. ISBN 0-905466-19-5. OCLC 5726624.
- Ferneyhough, Frank (1975). The History of Railways in Britain. Reading: Osprey. ISBN 0-85045-060-8. OCLC 2120140.
- Gahan, John W. (1985). Seaport to Seaside: Lines to Southport and Ormskirk - 13 decades of trains and travel. ISBN 978-0-907768-07-5.
- Marshall, John (1969). The Lancashire & Yorkshire Railway. Vol. 1. Newton Abbot: David & Charles. ISBN 978-0-7153-4352-4.
- Pettitt, Gordon; Comfort, Nicholas (2015). The Regional Railways Story. Oxford Publishing Company. ISBN 978-0-86093-663-3.
- Quick, Michael (2023) [2001]. Railway passenger stations in Great Britain: a chronology (PDF). version 5.05. Railway & Canal Historical Society.
- The Railway Clearing House (1970) [1904]. The Railway Clearing House Handbook of Railway Stations 1904 (1970 D&C Reprint ed.). Newton Abbot: David & Charles Reprints. ISBN 0-7153-5120-6.
- Trevena, Arthur (1980). Trains in Trouble. Vol. 1. Redruth: Atlantic Books. ISBN 0-906899-01-X.
