= Alexandra Dock railway station (Liverpool Overhead Railway) =

Disused railway station in Liverpool, England

Alexandra Dock

General information
- Location: Liverpool, Liverpool, Merseyside; England
- Coordinates: 53.4487°N 3.0055°W
- Platforms: 2

Other information
- Status: Disused

History
- Post-grouping: Liverpool Overhead Railway

Key dates
- 6 March 1893: Opened
- 30 December 1956: Closed completely
Location

Alexandra Dock was a station located on the Liverpool Overhead Railway, west of Regent Road (A565) and within the MDHC Dock Estate. The station was named after the adjacent Alexandra Dock.

The station was opened on the 6 March 1893 by the Marquis of Salisbury and was the northern terminus of the line until it was extended to Seaforth Sands just over a year later.

The station closed, along with the rest of the line, on 30 December 1956. No evidence of this station remains.

== See also ==
- Alexandra Dock railway station, LNWR surface station serving the same dock

Preceding station	Disused railways	Following station
Langton Dock	Liverpool Overhead Railway	Gladstone Dock
