= Seaforth Sands railway station =

Former railway station in England

Seaforth Sands
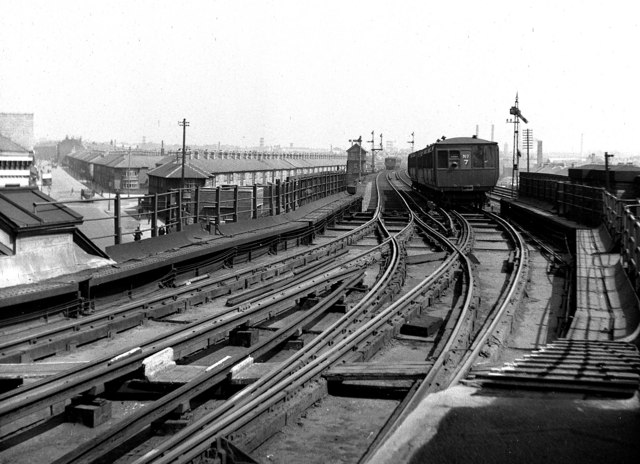

General information
- Location: Liverpool, Liverpool, Merseyside; England
- Coordinates: 53.4590°N 3.0107°W
- Platforms: 2 (4 between 1905-1925)

Other information
- Status: Disused

History
- Post-grouping: Liverpool Overhead Railway

Key dates
- 30 April 1894: Opened
- 30 Dec 1956: Closed completely
Location

Seaforth Sands was a terminus station located on the Liverpool Overhead Railway at Seaforth, west of Crosby Road South, Seaforth Road, Knowsley Road and Rimrose Road junctions.

== History ==
The station opened on 30 April 1894, as a northern extension from Alexandra Dock with a total cost of £10,000. In 1901 the country's second moving escalator was installed in the station. The escalator was later removed, in 1906, due to multiple occurrences of long skirts becoming trapped in the machinery.

With the LOR's second northern extension to Seaforth & Litherland on 2 July 1905, a 'through' station was built alongside the terminus. The original terminus platforms remained in use until 1925 when they were demolished and replaced by a large carriage shed.

It was the last overhead station before the junction with the North Mersey Branch. The weight gauge meant that while LOR trains could operate on the Lancashire and Yorkshire Railway electrified network, the reverse was not true.

As LOR trains ran at a lower voltage than the Lancashire and Yorkshire electric trains, LOR trains were permitted to operate with their motors in series mode only on the North Mersey Branch.

The station was victim to a serious arson attack on 4 February 1956; the attack occurred overnight, with evidence of an old tyre having been found inside the station building. Fifty firemen fought the fire, which consumed two trains and damaged the station buildings, bringing it under control within an hour. The total damage caused was around £30,000 and required the complete rebuilding of one of the platform buildings.

The station closed, along with the rest of the line, on 30 December 1956. No evidence of this station remains.

Preceding station	Disused railways	Following station
Terminus	Lancashire and Yorkshire Railway; Liverpool, Crosby and Southport Railway	Seaforth & Litherland
Terminus	Lancashire and Yorkshire Railway; North Mersey Branch	Linacre Road
Gladstone Dock (LOR)	Liverpool Overhead Railway	Terminus
