= Gladstone Dock railway station (Liverpool Overhead Railway) =

Former railway station in England

Gladstone Dock

General information
- Location: Liverpool, Liverpool, Merseyside; England
- Coordinates: 53.4545°N 3.0110°W
- Platforms: 2

Other information
- Status: Disused

History
- Post-grouping: Liverpool Overhead Railway

Key dates
- 16 June 1930: Opened
- 30 December 1956: Closed completely
Location

Gladstone Dock was a station on the Liverpool Overhead Railway, between Alexandra Dock and Seaforth Sands. It was opened on 16 June 1930, the final station to open on the network.

It was named after the adjacent Gladstone Dock, and was the only station on the network to be accessible directly from the dockside, with two steel bridges connecting the platforms, as it primarily served the passenger liners which frequently docked nearby. Only the northbound platform was directly accessible from the street.

The station was opened at 6am on the first day of operation without a formal ceremony. It was originally only open on weekdays, but service was intended to be extended to be extended to weekends.

The station was damaged during the Liverpool Blitz, requiring it to be rebuilt.

The station closed, along with the rest of the line on 30 December 1956. No evidence of the station remains.

Preceding station	Disused railways	Following station
Alexandra Dock	Liverpool Overhead Railway	Seaforth Sands
