= Dingle railway station =

Former station on the Liverpool Overhead Railway, England

Dingle
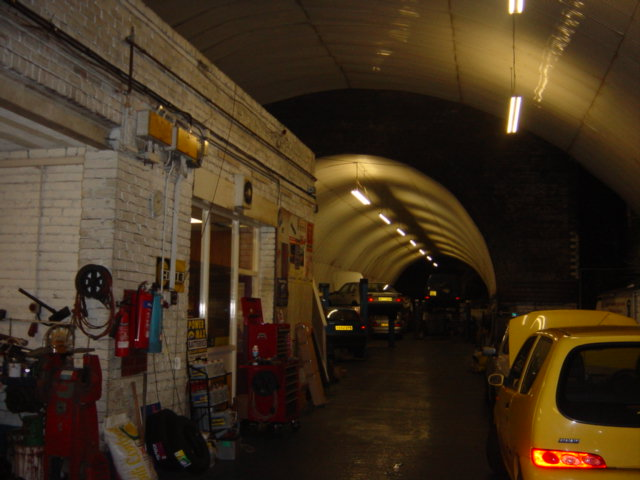
- The former station site, 2005

General information
- Location: Dingle, Liverpool, England
- Coordinates: 53.3814°N 2.9584°W

Other information
- Status: Disused

History
- Original company: Liverpool Overhead Railway

Key dates
- 21 December 1896: Station opened
- 30 December 1956: Station closed
Location

Dingle is a disused underground railway station located on the Liverpool Overhead Railway (LOR), at the south end of Park Road, in Dingle, Liverpool, England. It was the only below ground station on the line. Trains accessed the station via a half-mile tunnel, bored from the cliff face at Herculaneum Dock to Park Road.

== History ==
The extension to a new southern terminus at Dingle was opened on 21 December 1896 with the first trains leaving from Dingle station at 5am that morning, carrying a large number of dock workers. There were plans for the tunnel to extend further inland, with a few more stations when funds were available.

Preceding station	Disused railways	Following station
Terminus	Liverpool Overhead Railway	Herculaneum Dock

=== Incidents ===
On the evening of 23 December 1901, a motor on a train pulling into the station fused, causing large amounts of sparking, which ignited a stack of wooden sleepers by the railside. The resulting fire spread to the train carriages and station; six people died: the train's guard and driver, the station foreman, a carriage cleaner and two passengers. The general manager of the railway stated that the fusing would "scarcely have caused £5 worth of damage" if not for the wind which was blowing into the tunnel and fanning the flames. The station was closed for more than a year.

=== Closure ===
The station was closed permanently on 30 December 1956, along with the rest of the Liverpool Overhead Railway.

== The site today ==
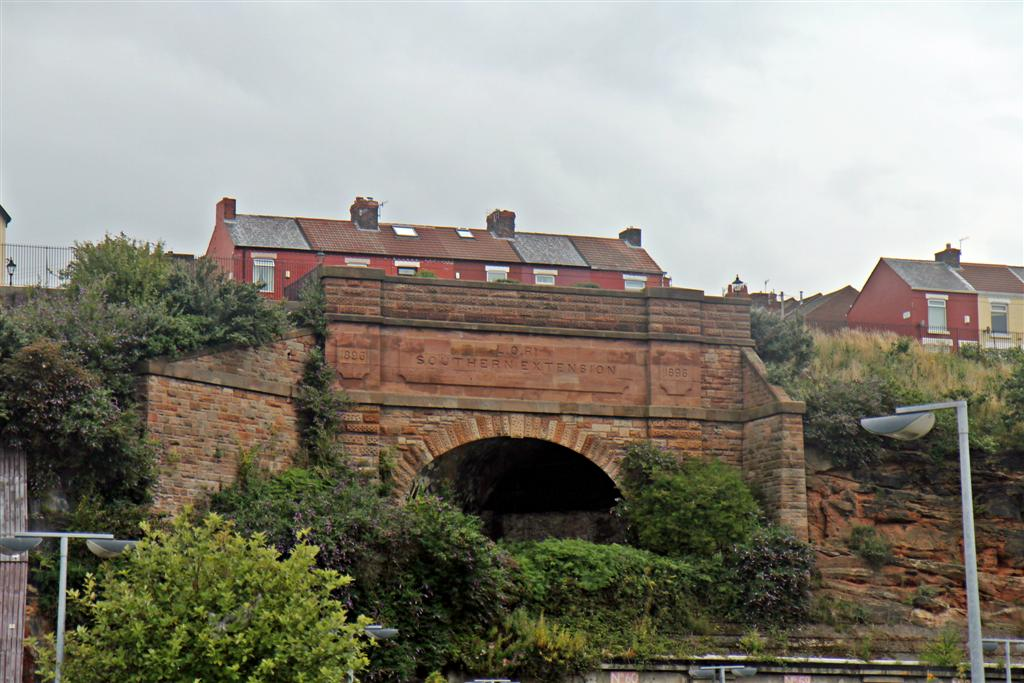
The Southern Extension Tunnel is the entrance to Dingle station

It is the last remaining part of the Overhead railway, with the surface entrance still standing. The former platform and track area were in use as a garage until 2015.

At approximately 11:30am on 24 July 2012, part of the tunnel near Dingle railway station collapsed. A number of homes above this section of the tunnel were evacuated. In October 2013 work commenced to repair the tunnel, with residents allowed back into their homes in February 2014.
