= Fazakerley (disambiguation) =

Fazakerley is a suburb of Liverpool, Merseyside, England.

Fazakerley also refers to:

- Dixons Fazakerley Academy, a secondary school
- Fazakerley railway station
- Fazakerley (ward), a Liverpool City Council ward
- New Hall, Fazakerley
- ROF Fazakerley, an ordnance factory

== People with the surname ==
- Nicholas Fazakerley (1685?–1767), English lawyer and politician
- John Nicholas Fazakerley (1787–1852), British politician

== See also ==
- Fazackerley (surname)
