= Ford railway station (Merseyside) =

Former railway station in England

Ford
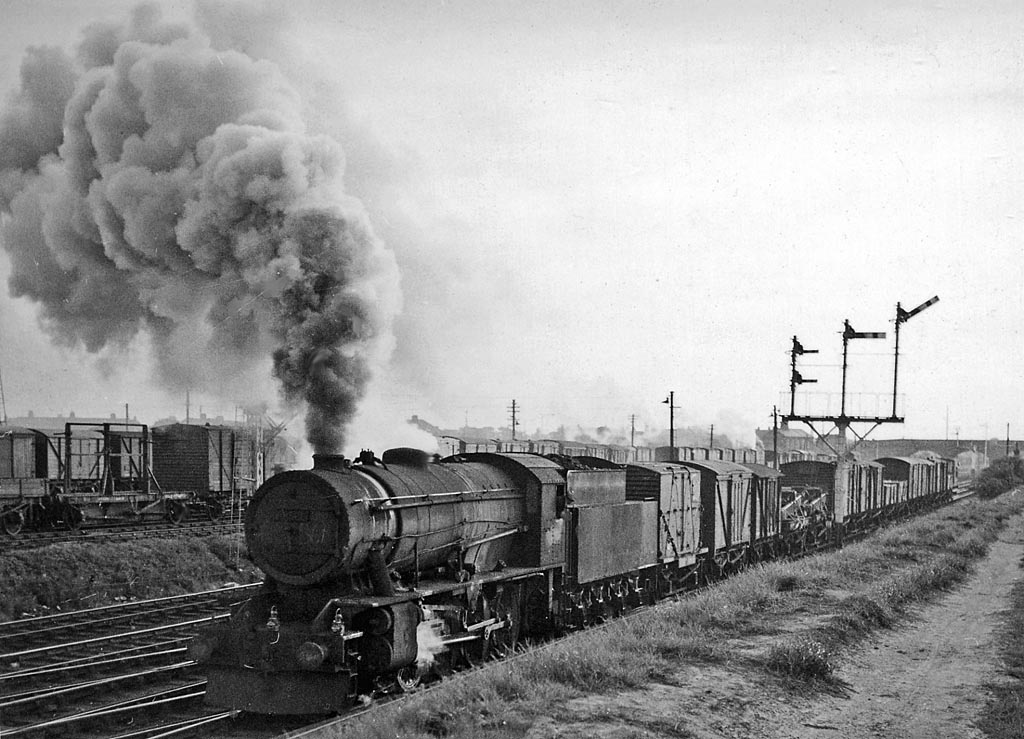
- Railway near Ford station in 1959, the site of which was near the road bridge in the background

General information
- Location: Netherton, Sefton; England
- Coordinates: 53.4696°N 2.9749°W
- Grid reference: SJ354974
- Line: North Mersey Branch
- Platforms: 2

Other information
- Status: Disused

History
- Original company: Lancashire and Yorkshire Railway
- Pre-grouping: Lancashire and Yorkshire Railway
- Post-grouping: London, Midland and Scottish Railway

Key dates
- 1 June 1906: Opened
- 2 April 1951: Closed
Location

Ford railway station was a station located on the North Mersey Branch, north Liverpool, Merseyside, England.

== History ==
The North Mersey Branch line through the station site was opened by the Lancashire and Yorkshire Railway (L&YR) for freight on 27 August 1866, the branch connecting the North Mersey goods station to the main line between Liverpool Exchange and Wigan.

The station opened for service on 1 June 1906 when the Seaforth connecting line was opened and the line between Aintree and Marsh Lane & Strand Road using the connecting line was electrified.

The station was located at the west end of Aintree Sorting sidings where Captains Lane crossed the line on an over bridge. The station was to the east of road, a wooden booking office was located at road level with separate steps leading down to each platform, one either side of the running lines. The platforms were of all wooden construction with simple waiting shelters.

There was an early short-lived service through, and probably using, the station when a connection was made with the Liverpool Overhead Railway (LOR) near their Seaforth Sands station and through services were run from Aintree through the station onto the LOR to Dingle, this route needed lighter and smaller trains to operate along the LOR and twelve were built for this service, it was not a successful venture and stopped in September 1908, the trains being redeployed.

In 1910 there were 17 services in each direction on a week day, with about half of the Aintree services continuing on to Maghull (electric trains started running to here on 1 October 1909). In the other direction the services ran over the Seaforth connecting line through Marsh Lane & Strand Road to Liverpool Exchange.

In 1914 a section of line from where the connecting line joined the branch toward the docks was electrified and Gladstone Dock station opened. A new service began from Gladstone Dock to Aintree, there were seven trains each day in each direction with an extra service on Saturdays. The service ceased on 7 July 1924 when Gladstone Dock station closed.

On race days at Aintree racecourse passenger trains, including those of the Liverpool Overhead Railway would pass through the station site on special services to and from Aintree Sefton Arms station (on these occasions the L&YR stations at Aintree were differentiated by adding Sefton Arms or Racecourse).

The Lancashire and Yorkshire Railway amalgamated with the London and North Western Railway on 1 January 1922 and in turn was Grouped into the London, Midland and Scottish Railway in 1923. Nationalisation followed in 1948.

In 1939 the London, Midland and Scottish Railway (LMS) was operating about 22 services each way that stopped at the station. By 1944 this had reduced to around twelve each way.

The station closed on 2 April 1951 but the line continued to be used by freight trains. The LOR service for the Grand National ceased when the LOR closed at the end of 1956.

Demolition of Ford station was completed on 1 May 1959.

== Reopening proposals ==
This section of the line still exists, although has no passenger services running and is no longer electrified, with the only trains running being for engineer access to the Ormskirk line.

Plans to open this section as part of Merseyrail's Northern Line have been put forward in Sefton's transport plan, with the first details to emerge about its possible reopening being published by the media on 28 February 2008.

Abbreviations

Preceding station	Disused railways	Following station
Aintree	Lancashire and Yorkshire Railway; North Mersey Branch and Liverpool, Crosby and Southport Railway	Linacre Road towards Marsh Lane & Strand Road and Liverpool Exchange
Aintree	Lancashire and Yorkshire Railway; North Mersey Branch	Linacre Road towards Gladstone Dock

== See also ==
- Ford district

== Bibliography ==
- Bolger, Paul (1994). Merseyside and District Railway Stations. The Bluecoat Press.
- Bradshaw, George (1968) [April 1910]. April 1910 Railway Guide. Newton Abbot: David & Charles. ISBN 978-0-7153-4246-6. OCLC 30645.
- Bradshaw, George (1944). Bradshaw's Guide for Great Britain and Ireland: March 1944 (PDF). Henry Blacklock.
- Ferneyhough, Frank (1975). The History of Railways in Britain. Reading: Osprey. ISBN 0-85045-060-8. OCLC 2120140.
- Gahan, John W. (1985). Seaport to Seaside: Lines to Southport and Ormskirk - 13 decades of trains and travel. ISBN 978-0-907768-07-5.
- Marshall, John (1970). The Lancashire & Yorkshire Railway. Vol. 2. Newton Abbot: David & Charles. ISBN 978-0-7153-4906-9.
- LMS Railway (1939). London Midland & Scottish Passenger Railway Timetable- July 3rd to September 24th, inclusive, 1939. London: LMS.
- Quick, Michael (2023) [2001]. Railway passenger stations in Great Britain: a chronology (PDF). version 5.05. Railway & Canal Historical Society.
