= Aintree railway station (disambiguation) =

Aintree railway station may refer to:

- Aintree railway station, a former Lancashire and Yorkshire Railway station now on the Ormskirk branch of the Merseyrail network's Northern line, also formerly known as Aintree Sefton Arms
- Aintree Central railway station on the Southport & Cheshire Lines Extension Railway, formerly known as Aintree and Aintree Racecourse
- Aintree Racecourse railway station, a former temporary Lancashire and Yorkshire Railway station on the North Mersey Branch, built to serve the Aintree Racecourse
- Fazakerley railway station, a former Lancashire and Yorkshire Railway station on the Liverpool and Bury Railway, now on the Headbolt Lane branch of the Merseyrail network's Northern line, and between 1850 and 1860 known as Aintree
