= Bootle Oriel Road railway station =

Merseyrail railway station in Bootle, Sefton

Bootle Oriel Road
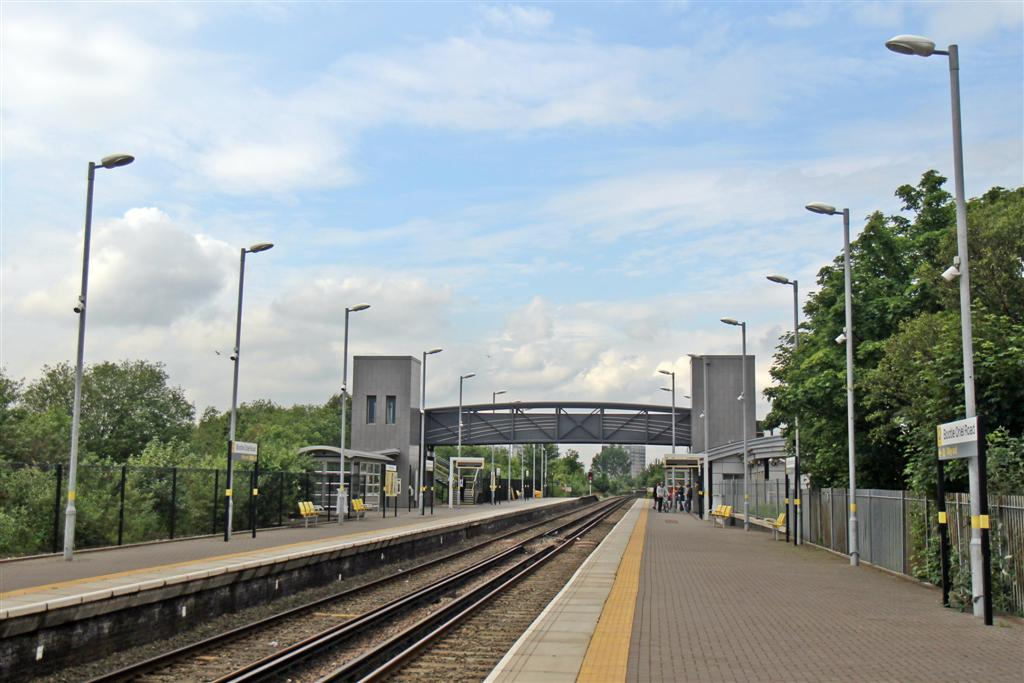

General information
- Location: Bootle, Sefton; England
- Coordinates: 53.4468°N 2.9957°W
- Grid reference: SJ339949
- Manager: Merseyrail
- Transit authority: Merseytravel
- Platforms: 2

Other information
- Station code: BOT
- Fare zone: C1/C3
- Classification: DfT category E

History
- Original company: Lancashire and Yorkshire Railway
- Pre-grouping: Lancashire and Yorkshire Railway
- Post-grouping: London, Midland and Scottish Railway

Key dates
- 1 May 1876: Station opened as Bootle
- 2 June 1924: Renamed to Bootle Oriel Road

Passengers
- 2021/22: ▲0.504 million
- 2022/23: ▲0.584 million
- 2023/24: ▲0.602 million
- 2024/25: ▲0.692 million
- 2025/26: ▲0.762 million
Location
Notes
- Passenger statistics from the Office of Rail and Road

Bootle Oriel Road railway station is a railway station in Bootle, Merseyside, England. It is situated near the town's Victorian civic centre, opposite Bootle Town Hall, although the surrounding area is now largely residential. It is located on the Northern Line of the Merseyrail network.

== History ==
Bootle Oriel Road railway station was opened as Bootle on 1 May 1876 by the Lancashire and Yorkshire Railway (L&YR) on its Liverpool to Southport line (the former Liverpool, Crosby and Southport Railway) to replace two stations, Bootle Village and Miller's Bridge, it was sited between them. The station was constructed by Dransfield and Company at a cost of £6,684 (equivalent to £667,000 in 2025 (Note: UK Consumer Price Index inflation figures from 1209–2024 based on data from "Inflation calculator". Bank of England. London. 18 February 2026.)).

The station was built largely of "yellow glazed bricks with an over-abundance of roofing supported on numerous iron columns". There are four platforms, the centre ones being a wide island, connected by a subway. the booking office faces onto Oriel Road and there is a cab rank.

There an additional two tracks that avoid the station on the western side behind a wall descending to Bankfield Goods Yard.

The station was renamed to Bootle Oriel Road on 2 June 1924.

Most of the services through the station were going to or from Liverpool Exchange and Southport, there were additional commuter services on this line that terminated at Blundellsands and Crosby prior to electrification in 1904 and Hall Road afterwards. From 1906 to 1951 services also ran through the station on a route from Liverpool Exchange to Aintree.

Passengers from the London and North Western Railway's Bootle Balliol Road station could access the station via a long sloping footpath and a short walk along Oriel Road.

The Lancashire and Yorkshire Railway amalgamated with the London and North Western Railway on 1 January 1922 and in turn was Grouped into the London, Midland and Scottish Railway in 1923. Nationalisation followed in 1948.

In 1978 the station became part of the Merseyrail network's Northern Line (operated by British Rail until privatised in 1995).

== Facilities ==
There is a booking office where staff are available 15 minutes before the first train until 15 minutes after the last train. Both platforms can be accessed via ramps or lifts. There is car parking for 4 cars and secure cycle storage for 24 cycles, plus toilets and a payphone. Train running information is provided via automated announcements, digital CIS displays, customer help points on each platform and timetable posters.

== Services ==
Trains operate every 15 minutes throughout the day from Monday to Saturday, to Southport to the north, and to Liverpool Central to the south. Sunday services are every 30 minutes in each direction.

Preceding station	National Rail	Following station
Bootle New Strand towards Southport	Merseyrail; Northern Line	Bank Hall towards Liverpool Central
	Historical railways	
Marsh Lane towards Southport	Lancashire and Yorkshire Railway; Liverpool, Crosby and Southport Railway	Liverpool North Docks towards Liverpool Exchange
Marsh Lane towards Aintree	Lancashire and Yorkshire Railway; North Mersey Branch	Liverpool North Docks towards Liverpool Exchange

== Gallery ==
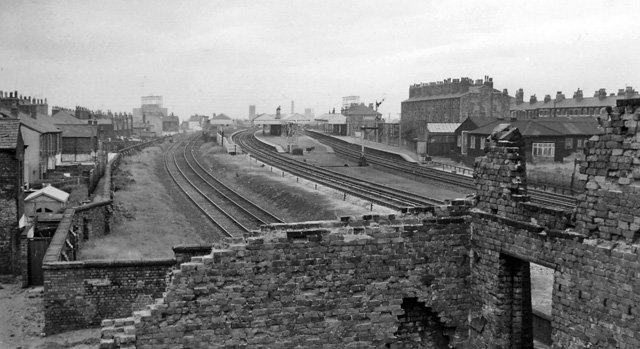
Bootle Oriel Road in 1962. The two extra tracks on the left are the goods lines from Bankfield.

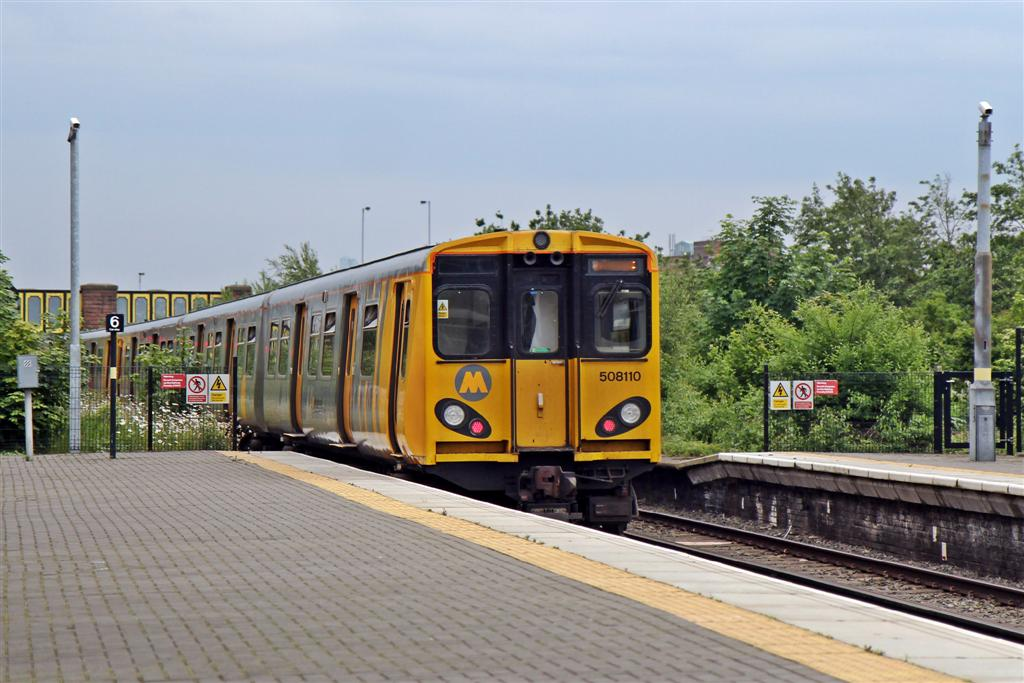
A Merseyrail Class 508 departs from the station.

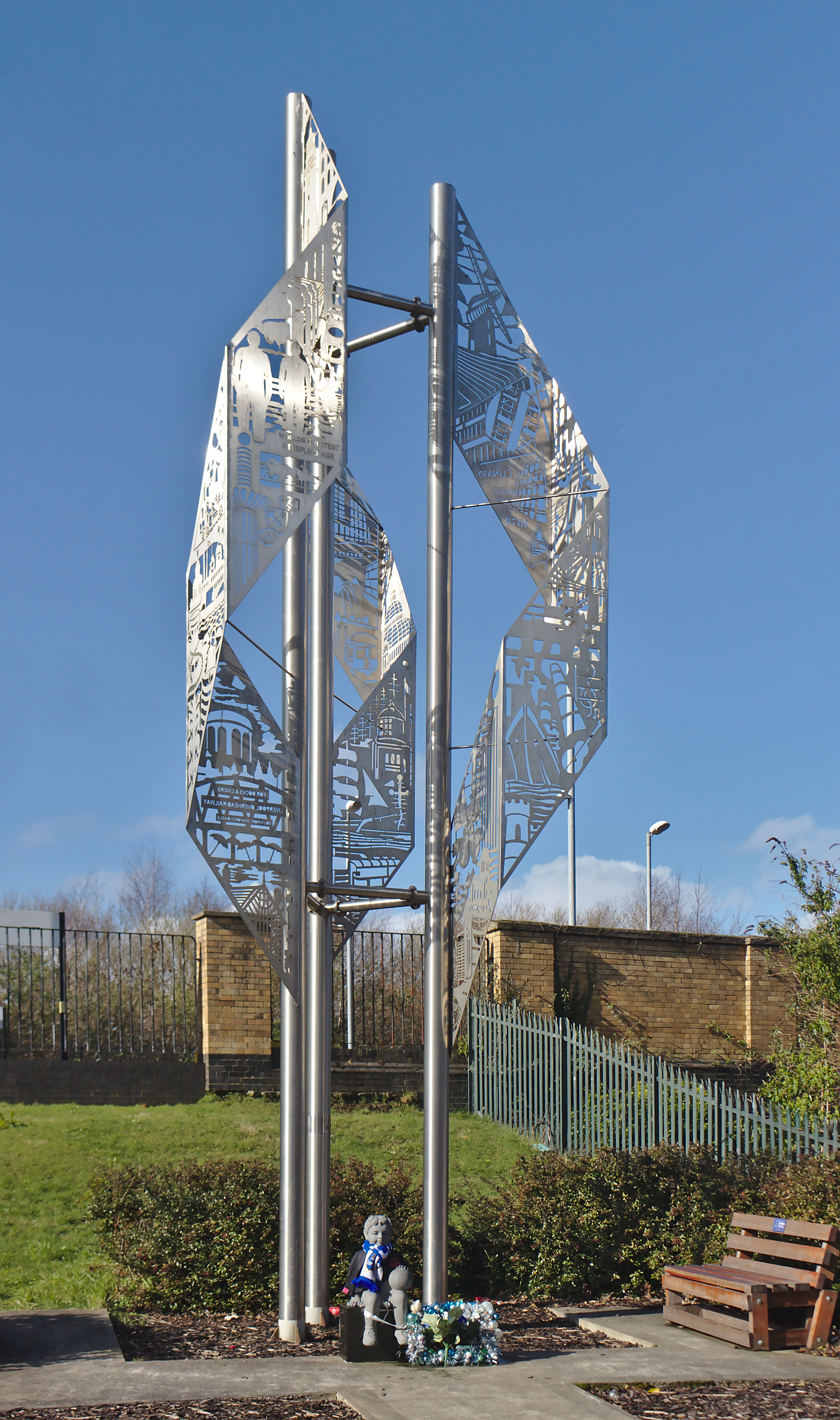
The Liverpool sculpture outside the station.

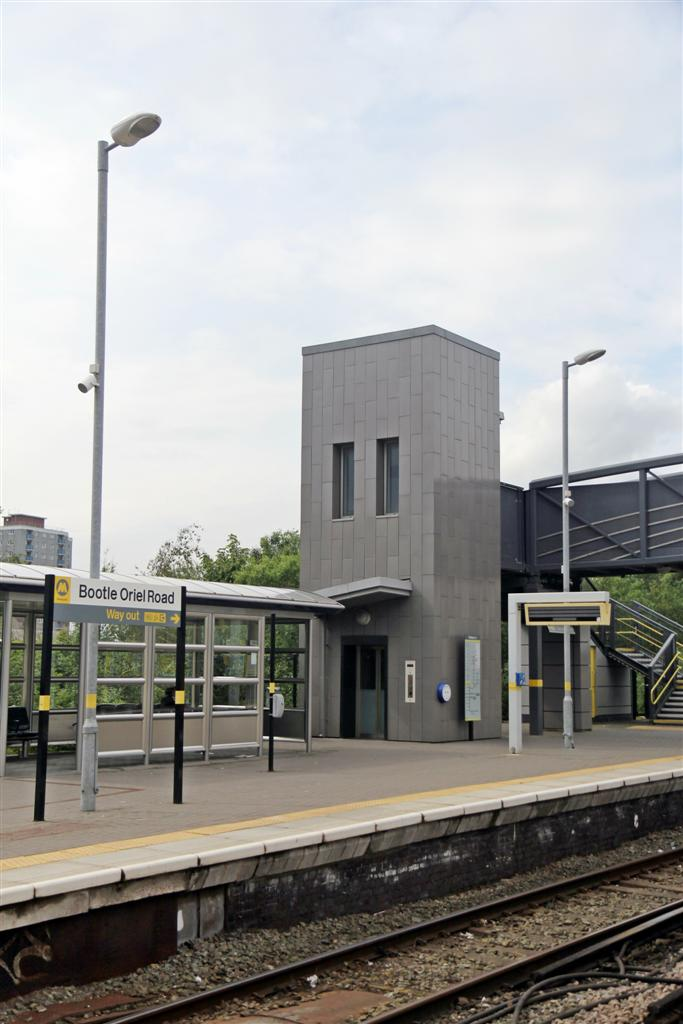
Special access to the new footbridge.
