= Angel of Mercy =

Angel of Mercy may refer to:

== People, figures, roles, characters ==
- Abdul Sattar Edhi, founder of the Edhi Foundation
- Angel of mercy (criminology)
- Angel of Mercy, in the Islamic, Jewish and Christian traditions, a messenger from God, especially the archangel Michael
- Angel of mercy, affectionate nickname for a nurse

== Places, fictional locations ==
- Angels of Mercy Hospital, Los Angeles, California, USA; a fictional hospital in the TV show City of Angels (2000 TV series)

== Arts, entertainment, media ==
=== Film ===
- The Angel of Mercy (film), a 1946 film by Youssef Wahbi
- Angel of Mercy (1993 film) by Miloslav Luther
- Angel of Mercy, a 1939 film directed by Edward L. Cahn

=== Television ===
- "Angel of Mercy" (The Bionic Woman), a 1976 episode
- "Angel of Mercy" (Doctors), a 2004 episode
- "Angel of Mercy" (Ratched), a 2020 episode
- "Angels of Mercy", a 1976 episode of season 2 of Laverne & Shirley

=== Literature ===
- Angels of Mercy, a 1994 occult book by Rosemary Ellen Guiley
- Angels of Mercy: A Woman's Hospital on the Western Front: 1914-1918, a 2013 non-fiction book by Eileen Crofton

==== Novels ====
- Angel of Mercy, 1994 novel by Andrew Neiderman
- Angel of Mercy, 2000 novel by Lurlene McDaniel
- Angels of Mercy, 1998 novel by Lyn Andrews
- Angels of Mercy, a novel series by C. J. Lyons

=== Music ===
- Angels of Mercy, a 1992 album by Susan Ashton

==== Songs ====
- "Angel of Mercy", a song by Maurice Gibb and his daughter, Samantha Gibb, released in 2010 on the Bee Gees box set Mythology
- "Angel of Mercy", a song by Black Label Society from the album Catacombs of the Black Vatican
- "Angel of Mercy", a song by the heavy metal band Chastain from the album Ruler of the Wasteland, covered by HammerFall
- "Angel of Mercy", a song from the album Communiqué by Dire Straits
- "Angel of Mercy", a song from the album A Different Kind of Weather by The Dream Academy
- "Angel of Mercy", a blues song by Homer Banks and Raymond Jackson, on the album I'll Play the Blues for You by Albert King
- "Angel of Mercy", a song from the album Rogues en Vogue by Running Wild
- "Angel of Mercy", a song by Al Stewart from the album Famous Last Words
- "Angel of Mercy", a song from the album Junction Seven by Steve Winwood
- "Angels of Mercy", a song from the album Rulebreaker by Primal Fear

== Other uses ==
- Angel of Mercy (helicopter), a nickname for the Korean War medevac version of the Bell H-13 Sioux helicopter

== See also ==
- Kate Hopkins, Angel of Mercy, a U.S. radio drama
- Merciful Angel, code name used during the NATO bombing of Yugoslavia
- Mercy Angel, a 1994 CD record by Lindsey Horner
