= Bootle New Strand railway station =

Railway station in Bootle, Merseyside, England

Bootle New Strand
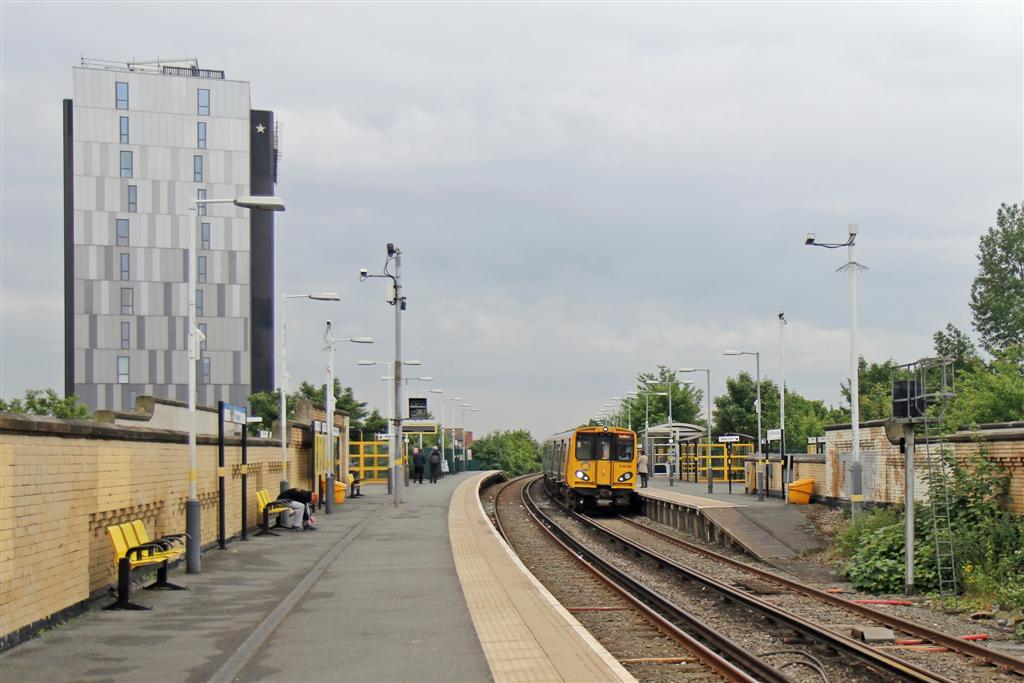

General information
- Location: Bootle, Sefton; England
- Coordinates: 53.4534°N 2.9948°W
- Grid reference: SJ 340 956
- Managed by: Merseyrail
- Transit authority: Merseytravel
- Platforms: 2

Other information
- Station code: BNW
- Fare zone: C3
- Classification: DfT category E

History
- Original company: Liverpool, Crosby and Southport Railway
- Pre-grouping: Lancashire and Yorkshire Railway
- Post-grouping: London, Midland and Scottish Railway

Key dates
- 1 October 1850: Opened as Marsh Lane
- 11 April 1886: Rebuilt and renamed Marsh Lane and Strand Road
- 19 May 1941: Closed
- 12 July 1943: Re-opened
- 6 March 1967: Renamed Bootle New Strand

Passengers
- 2020/21: ▼0.399 million
- Interchange: 74
- 2021/22: ▲0.790 million
- Interchange: ▲511
- 2022/23: ▼0.747 million
- Interchange: ▲1,254
- 2023/24: ▲0.770 million
- Interchange: ▲1,430
- 2024/25: ▲0.885 million
Location
Notes
- Passenger statistics from the Office of Rail and Road

Bootle New Strand railway station is a railway station in the centre of Bootle, Merseyside, England. It is on the Northern Line of the Merseyrail network and serves in particular the nearby New Strand Shopping Centre. The platforms are elevated and are reached by ramps from the entrance at street level. Connecting bus services leave from the nearby bus station in the basement of New Strand Shopping Centre.

== History ==
The station opened as Marsh Lane on 1 October 1850 when the Liverpool, Crosby and Southport Railway (LC&SR) extended its line from Waterloo south into Liverpool.

The station was situated on the north side of Marsh Lane which was crossed with a level crossing. It is shown on the OS 1850 six-inch map as Marsh Lane and Linacre station but with no details.

In 1850 the LC&SR had been authorised to lease, sell or transfer itself to the L&YR and on 14 June 1855 the L&YR purchased and took over the LC&SR.

It was rebuilt in an elevated position on south side of Marsh Lane, opening on 11 April 1886 and called Marsh Lane & Strand Road, there were now four tracks running through the station with platforms on the outside tracks and a wide island platform serving the inner two, all but the eastern platform had waiting rooms and extensive canopies.

The station became a junction station on 1 June 1906 when the North Mersey Branch was electrified between Liverpool Exchange and Aintree Sefton Arms using the Seaforth connecting line, Linacre Road being the next station in that direction. The passenger service on this route was withdrawn on 2 April 1951.

The Lancashire and Yorkshire Railway amalgamated with the London and North Western Railway on 1 January 1922 and in turn was Grouped into the London, Midland and Scottish Railway in 1923.

The station was closed by enemy action on 19 May 1941, reopening on 12 July 1943. When it re-opened it had no platform buildings until 1945 when pre-fabricated waiting shelters were provided.

The station was renamed Bootle New Strand on 6 March 1967 in anticipation of the nearby New Strand Shopping Centre opening.

In 1978 the station became part of the Merseyrail network's Northern Line (operated by British Rail until privatised in 1995).

== Facilities ==
The station has a ticket office and is staffed, during all opening hours, and has platform CCTV. There is step-free access to both platforms provided by 30 metre long ramps. There are cycle racks for 10 cycles and secure cycle storage for 32 cycles. There is a newsagents in the main building and a public telephone on platform 1. Service running information is available via CIS screens, automated announcements, customer help points and timetable poster boards.

== Services ==
Trains operate every 15 minutes throughout the day from Monday to Saturday, to Southport to the north, and to Liverpool Central to the south. Sunday services are every 30 minutes in each direction.

Preceding station	National Rail	Following station
Seaforth & Litherland towards Southport	Merseyrail; Northern Line	Bootle Oriel Road towards Liverpool Central
	Historical railways	
Seaforth towards Southport	Lancashire and Yorkshire Railway; Liverpool, Crosby and Southport Railway	Bootle Village towards Liverpool Exchange; 1850–1876
Seaforth towards Southport	Lancashire and Yorkshire Railway; Liverpool, Crosby and Southport Railway	Bootle towards Liverpool Exchange since 1876
Linacre Road towards Aintree	Lancashire and Yorkshire Railway; North Mersey Branch	Bootle towards Liverpool Exchange

== Gallery ==
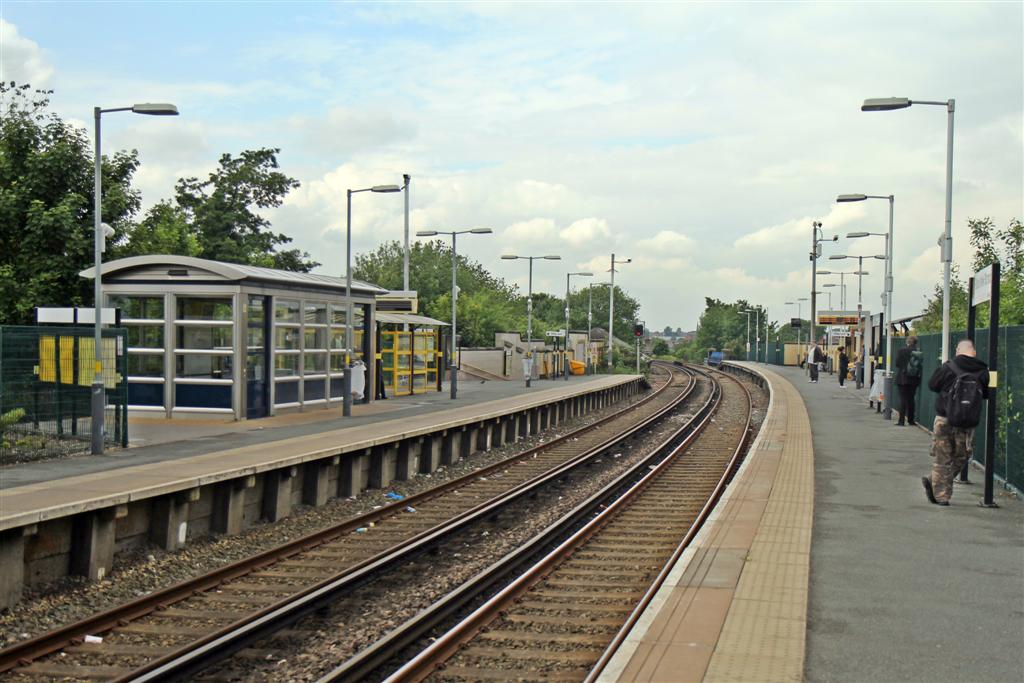
Looking north along the Liverpool-bound platform.

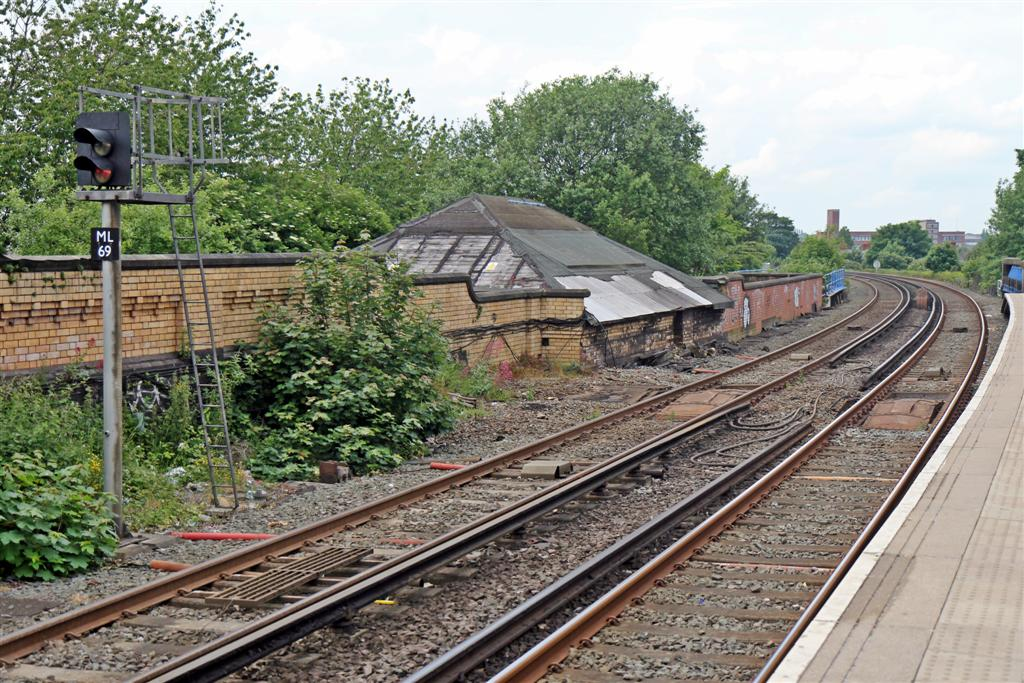
The northern end of the station.

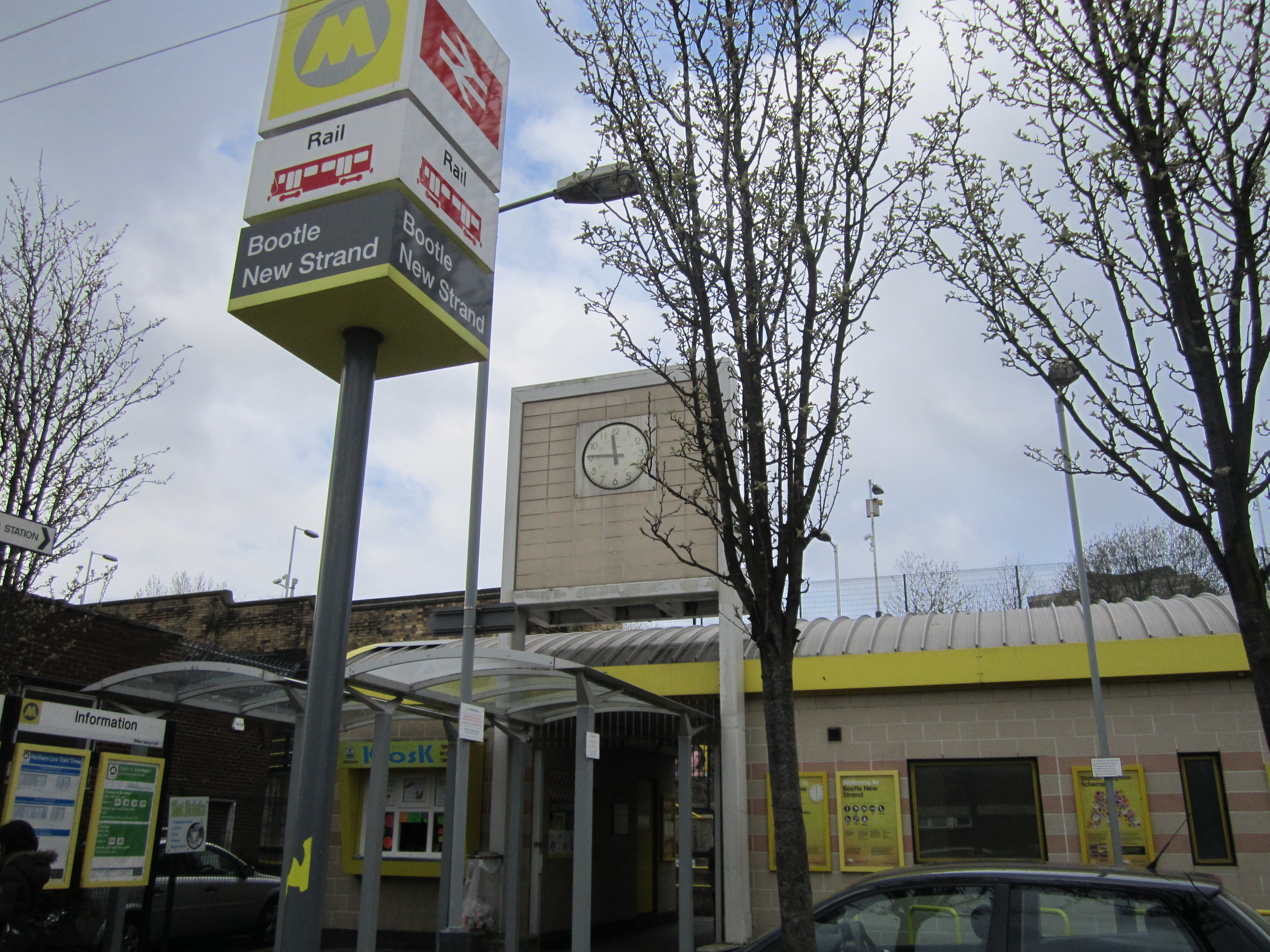
The main entrance to the station.

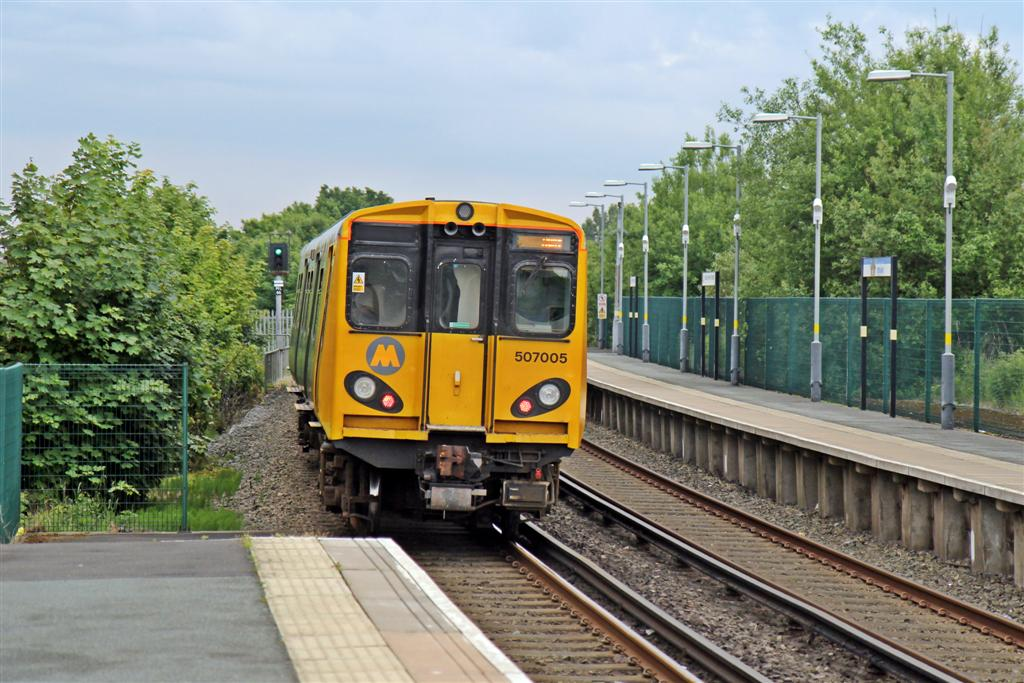
A Merseyrail Class 507 departs towards Liverpool.

== Bibliography ==
- Awdry, Christopher (1990). Encyclopaedia of British Railway Companies. Sparkford: Patrick Stephens Ltd. ISBN 1-8526-0049-7. OCLC 19514063. CN 8983.
- Ferneyhough, Frank (1975). The History of Railways in Britain. Reading: Osprey. ISBN 0-85045-060-8. OCLC 2120140.
- Gahan, John W. (1985). Seaport to Seaside: Lines to Southport and Ormskirk - 13 decades of trains and travel. Countryvise. ISBN 978-0-907768-07-5.
- Marshall, John (1969). The Lancashire & Yorkshire Railway. Vol. 1. Newton Abbot: David & Charles. ISBN 978-0-7153-4352-4.
- Marshall, John (1970). The Lancashire & Yorkshire Railway. Vol. 2. Newton Abbot: David & Charles. ISBN 978-0-7153-4906-9.
- Pettitt, Gordon; Comfort, Nicholas (2015). The Regional Railways Story. Oxford Publishing Company. ISBN 978-0-86093-663-3.
- Quick, Michael (2023) [2001]. Railway passenger stations in Great Britain: a chronology (PDF). version 5.05. Railway & Canal Historical Society.
