= Fazackerley =

Fazackerley is a surname. Notable people with the surname include:

- Derek Fazackerley (born 1951), English footballer
- Erin Fazackerley (born 1998), Australian cricketer
- Kim Fazackerley (born 1967), Australian cricketer
- Stan Fazackerley (1891–1946), English footballer
- William Fazackerley (born 1998), former English cricketer

== See also ==
- Fazakerley, a suburb of the English city of Liverpool
- Fazakerley (disambiguation)
