= Fazakerley railway station =

Railway station in Merseyside, England

Fazakerley
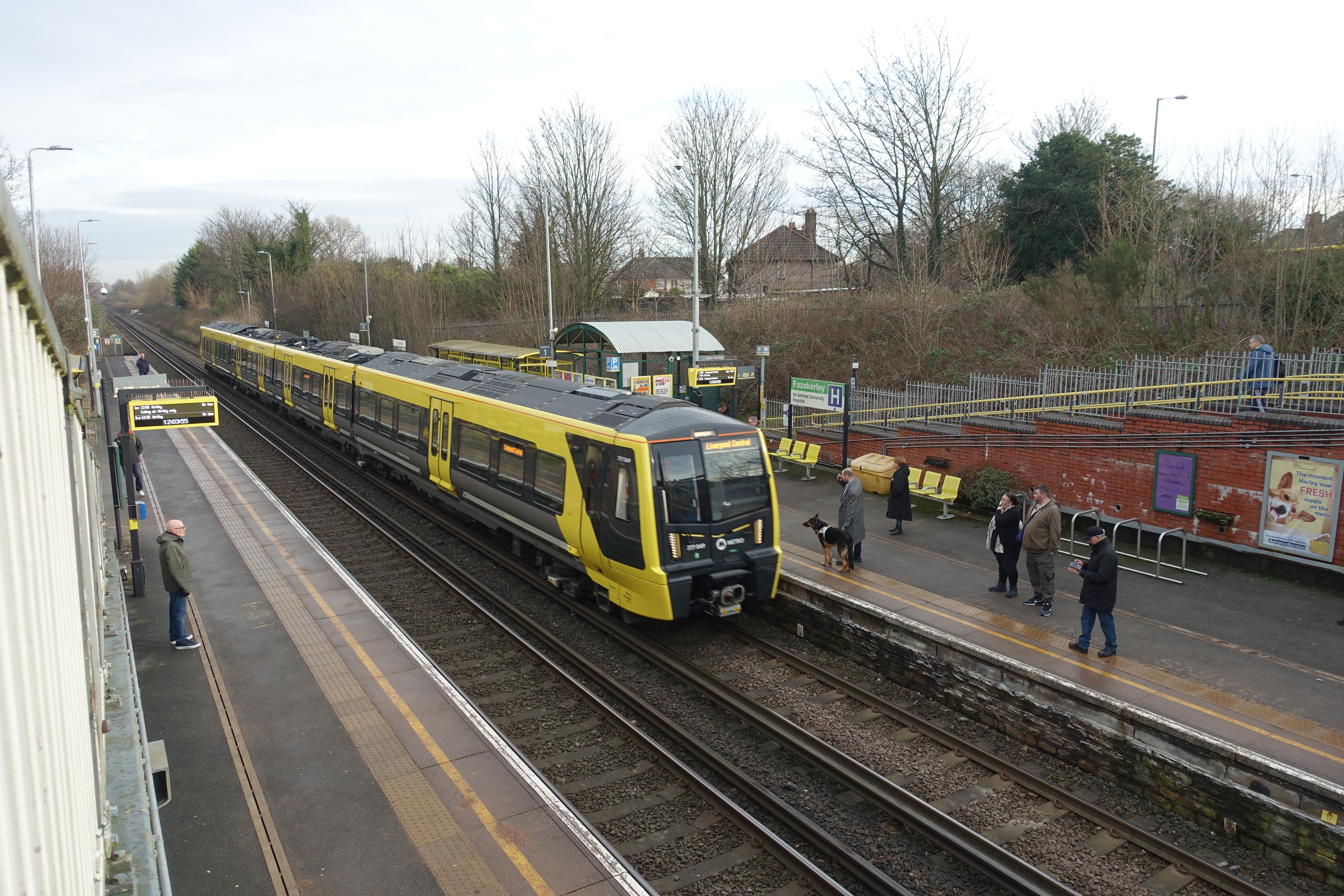
- Fazakerley railway station in 2023

General information
- Location: Fazakerley, Liverpool, England
- Coordinates: 53.4690°N 2.9368°W
- Grid reference: SJ379974
- Manager: Merseyrail
- Transit authority: Merseytravel
- Platforms: 2

Other information
- Station code: FAZ
- Fare zone: C1
- Classification: DfT category E

History
- Original company: Lancashire and Yorkshire Railway
- Pre-grouping: Lancashire and Yorkshire Railway
- Post-grouping: London, Midland and Scottish Railway

Key dates
- 20 November 1848: Station opens as Simonswood
- by 1850: Renamed Aintree
- March 1860: Renamed Fazakerley

Passengers
- 2021/22: ▲0.920 million
- 2022/23: ▼0.899 million
- 2023/24: ▲0.900 million
- 2024/25: ▲1.107 million
- 2025/26: ▲1.255 million
Location
Notes
- Passenger statistics from the Office of Rail and Road

Fazakerley railway station serves the suburb of Fazakerley, in Liverpool, Merseyside, England. It is a stop on the Headbolt Lane branch of the Northern Line on the Merseyrail network.

== History ==
The Liverpool and Bury Railway (L&BR) was authorised in 1845 but, while it was under construction, the L&BR amalgamated with the Manchester and Leeds Railway (M&LR) in 1846; the M&LR in turn was renamed the Lancashire and Yorkshire Railway in 1847. The line opened on 20 November 1848; one of the original stations was Simonswood. This station was renamed twice: it had become Aintree by 1850 and it took its present name Fazakerley in March 1860 to avoid confusion with the nearby Aintree station on a different line, which had opened in 1849.

At the time of opening, it lay 29 1/2 miles (47.5 km) from Bury, but it is now 31 miles 31 chains (50.5 km) from Manchester Victoria, via Wigan Wallgate.

To the north-east of the station is Fazakerley Junction, 30 miles 72 chains (49.7 km) from Manchester Victoria, which is where the North Mersey Branch once headed westwards towards Gladstone Dock. The branch has closed, but the junction remains as the point where the double track out of Liverpool becomes single track for the last few miles into Kirkby. The line eastwards was singled in May 1970, though through running beyond Kirkby (to Wigan Wallgate and Bolton) continued until the inauguration of electric operation in May 1977.

== Facilities ==
In common with most Merseyrail stations, it is staffed throughout the day; the street-level ticket office opens 15 minutes prior to start of service and closes at 00:25 each evening (including Sundays). At platform level, there are digital display screens, timetable posters and shelters on each side; a PA system also provides automated train running information. The ticket office is linked to the platforms via a footbridge; this has a lift installed on each side to provide step-free access. There are racks for four bicycles and secure storage for twenty.

== Services ==
The station is generally served by four trains per hour in each direction off-peak. In late evenings and on Sundays, services are reduced to two trains per hour in each direction.

Services are operated using Class 777 battery electric multiple units.

Preceding station	National Rail	Following station
Kirkby towards Headbolt Lane	Merseyrail Northern Line	Rice Lane towards Liverpool Central
