= Miller's Bridge railway station =

Former railway station in England

Miller's Bridge

General information
- Location: Bootle, Metropolitan Borough of Sefton; England
- Coordinates: 53.4443°N 2.9949°W
- Grid reference: SJ340946

Other information
- Status: Disused

History
- Original company: Liverpool, Crosby and Southport Railway
- Pre-grouping: Lancashire and Yorkshire Railway

Key dates
- By 1851: Opened
- 1 May 1876: Closed

Miller's Bridge railway station was a station in Bootle, Lancashire, England, which opened in 1851 and closed in 1876.

The line through the site of the station opened on 1 October 1850 when the Liverpool, Crosby and Southport Railway extended its line from Waterloo south into Liverpool.

The station was opened at the end of 1850 or during 1851.

The station was situated on the southern side of Balliol Road where it crossed the railway on a bridge, there were two platforms, one each side of the double-track with a station building located on the east side.

The station closed on 1 May 1876 when it, and Bootle Village station, were replaced by Bootle Oriel Road which was built between them.

Preceding station	Historical railways	Following station
Bootle Village; Line open and station closed	Lancashire and Yorkshire Railway; Liverpool, Crosby and Southport Railway	Liverpool North Docks; Line and station (now Sandhills) open

== Bibliography ==
- Gahan, John W. (1985). Seaport to Seaside: Lines to Southport and Ormskirk - 13 decades of trains and travel. ISBN 978-0-907768-07-5.
- Holt, Geoffrey O.; Biddle, Gordon (1986). The North West. A Regional history of the railways of Great Britain. Vol. 10 (2nd ed.). David St. John Thomas. ISBN 978-0-946537-34-1. OCLC 643506870.
- Quick, Michael (2023) [2001]. Railway passenger stations in Great Britain: a chronology (PDF). version 5.05. Railway & Canal Historical Society.
