= Brenda M King =

British historian (1944–2021)

Brenda M King (30 June 1944 – 4 July 2021) was a British textile historian, specializing in the influence of Indian silks on British textile design and the achievements of the Victorian industrialist Thomas Wardle and his wife, Elizabeth, the founder of the Leek Embroidery Society.

== Biography ==
King was born in Fazakerley, Liverpool, to Mary (née Boyes) and James Duffy. When her father died, she left Blessed John Almond secondary school, aged 15 and without qualifications, in order to support the family financially. She worked at the Dunlop Rubber Company in Speke then became a dental nurse, working at Guy’s Hospital in London. She returned to education as a mature student, studying at Morley College, and Macclesfield College. She earned a BA in design history with practice at Manchester Metropolitan University (MMU), an MA in design at Liverpool University, specialising in “textile designs by fine artists”, followed by a PhD on "Collections of Indian Silk Textiles and Their Connection with the English Silk Industry Between 1830 and 1930" at the Royal College of Art.

King taught at North Staffs University and MMU, and on the MA course in museum and heritage studies at the University of Salford. She was associated with the Textile Society for more than 20 years, including ten years as Chair of the Society. She initiated The Textile Society Research Symposium, which was later named in her honour.

The "Brenda M King Research Symposium" is intended to encourage and share research on textiles.

The "Brenda M King Prize for Critical Writing in Textiles" is an annual award, named in her honour, for a piece of outstanding critical writing on any aspect of textiles including, but not limited to: history, dress, practice and process. Previous winners include: Megha Chauhan (2025), Pragya Sharma (2024) and James Fox (2023).

== Selected publications ==
- 2005 Silk and Empire (Manchester University Press). http://www.jstor.org/stable/jj.21996484.
- 2009 Dye, Print, Stitch: The Textiles of Thomas and Elizabeth Wardle (Macclesfield Museums Trust, 2009) ISBN 978-1870926003
- 2019 The Wardle Family and its Circle: Textile Production in the Arts and Crafts Era (Boydell Press) ISBN 978-1783273959
