= Bootle Village railway station =

Former railway station in England

Bootle Village

General information
- Location: Bootle, Metropolitan Borough of Sefton; England
- Coordinates: 53.4484°N 2.9960°W
- Grid reference: SJ339951
- Platforms: 2

Other information
- Status: Disused

History
- Original company: Liverpool, Crosby and Southport Railway
- Pre-grouping: Lancashire and Yorkshire Railway

Key dates
- 1 October 1850: Opened as Merton Road
- Late 1850/early 1851: Renamed Bootle Village
- 1 May 1876: Closed
Location

Bootle Village railway station was a station in Bootle, Lancashire, England, which opened in 1850 and closed in 1876.

The station opened as Merton Road on 1 October 1850 when the Liverpool, Crosby and Southport Railway (LC&SR) extended its line from Waterloo south into Liverpool. It was renamed within the first few months to try to prevent passengers getting confused and using the East Lancashire Railway's Bootle Lane station, which might have cost the LC&SR revenue.

The station was situated on the southern side of Merton Road where it crossed the railway on a bridge, there were two platforms, one each side of the double-track with a station building located on the east side.

The station closed on 1 May 1876 when it, and Miller's Bridge station, were replaced by Bootle Oriel Road which was built between them.

Preceding station	Historical railways	Following station
Marsh Lane; Line and station (now Bootle New Strand) open	Lancashire and Yorkshire Railway; Liverpool, Crosby and Southport Railway	Miller's Bridge; Line open and station closed

== Bibliography ==
- Gahan, John W. (1985). Seaport to Seaside: Lines to Southport and Ormskirk - 13 decades of trains and travel. ISBN 978-0-907768-07-5.
- Quick, Michael (2023) [2001]. Railway passenger stations in Great Britain: a chronology (PDF). version 5.05. Railway & Canal Historical Society.
