= Aintree Racecourse railway station =

Former railway station on the North Mersey Branch

Aintree Racecourse

General information
- Location: Aintree, Sefton; England
- Coordinates: 53.470°N 2.955°W
- Grid reference: SJ367974
- Line: North Mersey Branch
- Platforms: 1

Other information
- Status: Disused

History
- Original company: Lancashire and Yorkshire Railway
- Pre-grouping: Lancashire and Yorkshire Railway
- Post-grouping: London, Midland and Scottish Railway

Key dates
- c. 1890: Station opens, known as Aintree Cinder Lane
- 18 May 1910: Station officially named Aintree Racecourse
- 25 March 1961: Station closed
Location

Aintree Racecourse railway station was a station located on the North Mersey Branch, in Sefton, England. It originally opened as Aintree Cinder Lane around 1890 as the only station on the line at the time, only opening for race days at Aintree Racecourse.

== History ==
The Lancashire and Yorkshire Railway (L&YR) opened a temporary station to service the racecourse at Aintree sometime before 1878, the first mention of the station, in a newspaper advertising an excursion, called it Cinder Lane. In 1882 the company gave instructions for a platform to be constructed for race traffic.

It is not known when the station became known as Aintree Racecourse, the name had been in use since at least 1886 when the term was used in a newspaper article. The station was officially named Aintree Racecourse on 18 May 1910. (Note: Quick (2023) reports the Racecourse name being used in a newspaper article in 1886, it is shown on the OS map of 1893 as Race Course station and an extensive article about race traffic in Railway Magazine in 1906 calls it that.)

The station was situated on an embankment and overbridge that crossed Warbreck Moor on the usually goods only section of line between Fazakerley junction and Sefton junction to the east of the crossing former Liverpool, Ormskirk and Preston Railway.

There was not much room available on the top of the embankment for a station that could cope with the expected big crowds. To overcome this problem the eastbound track was raised and topped up to rail level with cinders to make one long platform divided into two sections, both capable of taking trains of 15 6-wheeled coaches. The normally westbound track was signalled for bi-directional operation. (Note: Not all of the platform was filled-in for all of the time. Most of the bibliographic sources use a 1912/1913 photograph sourced from the National Railway Museum taken to the east of the road bridge that shows the platform with the cinders levelling off at rail height to make the platform, with the platform being slightly raised from the running line. A later photograph taken from further west in 1933 shows a train with passengers disembarking but with no cinder infill.)

Before the races started the eastbound track was closed and became the platform, a one-way system operated on the westbound track. Before the races started all traffic arriving for the races arrived at the station from Fazakerley junction, passengers then left each train walking over the in-filled eastbound line directly into the racecourse. The train would then proceed to Aintree sorting sidings where it would be serviced for the return journey. (Note: This led to some unusual routings for trains, for example all the excursions to the races coming from the Crewe or Chester directions used a little used spur in Wigan to leave the West Coast Main Line, then passing through Wigan Wallgate station to approach Liverpool on the line through Kirkby.)

The process would be repeated in the opposite direction after the races, the traffic now heading eastbound on the normally westbound track, collecting their passengers then proceeding to Fazakerley junction where normal procedures were resumed. The rest of the year trains ran through the site as if the station did not exist.

The station was constructed in such a way that 1st and 3rd class passengers were directed to separate exits, and for departure the trains drew up with 1st and 3rd class carriages opposite the appropriate entrances. Some buildings were erected and the platform partially roofed in 1911–1912.

In 1905 the L&YR dealt with 26 trains arriving at the station between 1052 and 1420, most of these were L&YR excursions but there were also several L&NWR, a Hull and Barnsley Railway, and a North Eastern Railway train as well. They came from many directions including London, Rochdale, Walsall, Birmingham, Northampton, Hull, Leeds, York and North Wales.

For the 1913 Grand National the station handled 34 trains, conveying over 10,000 passengers between the hours of 1100 and 1400.

The Lancashire and Yorkshire Railway amalgamated with the London and North Western Railway on 1 January 1922 and in turn was Grouped into the London, Midland and Scottish Railway in 1923.

In 1934 the LMS ran 22 special trains to the station and in 1958 there were 14.

The line then passed on to the London Midland Region of British Railways on nationalisation in 1948.

The station was last used on 25 March 1961 when eight specials terminated there. The platform was removed in 1969 but the line was continued to be used for freight until 1971.

By 1987 the engineering depot at Fazakerley had closed and the line which ran through the station to Fazakerley sidings was removed.

The route of the line was converted into a foot and cycle path during the 1990s and no evidence of the station remains.

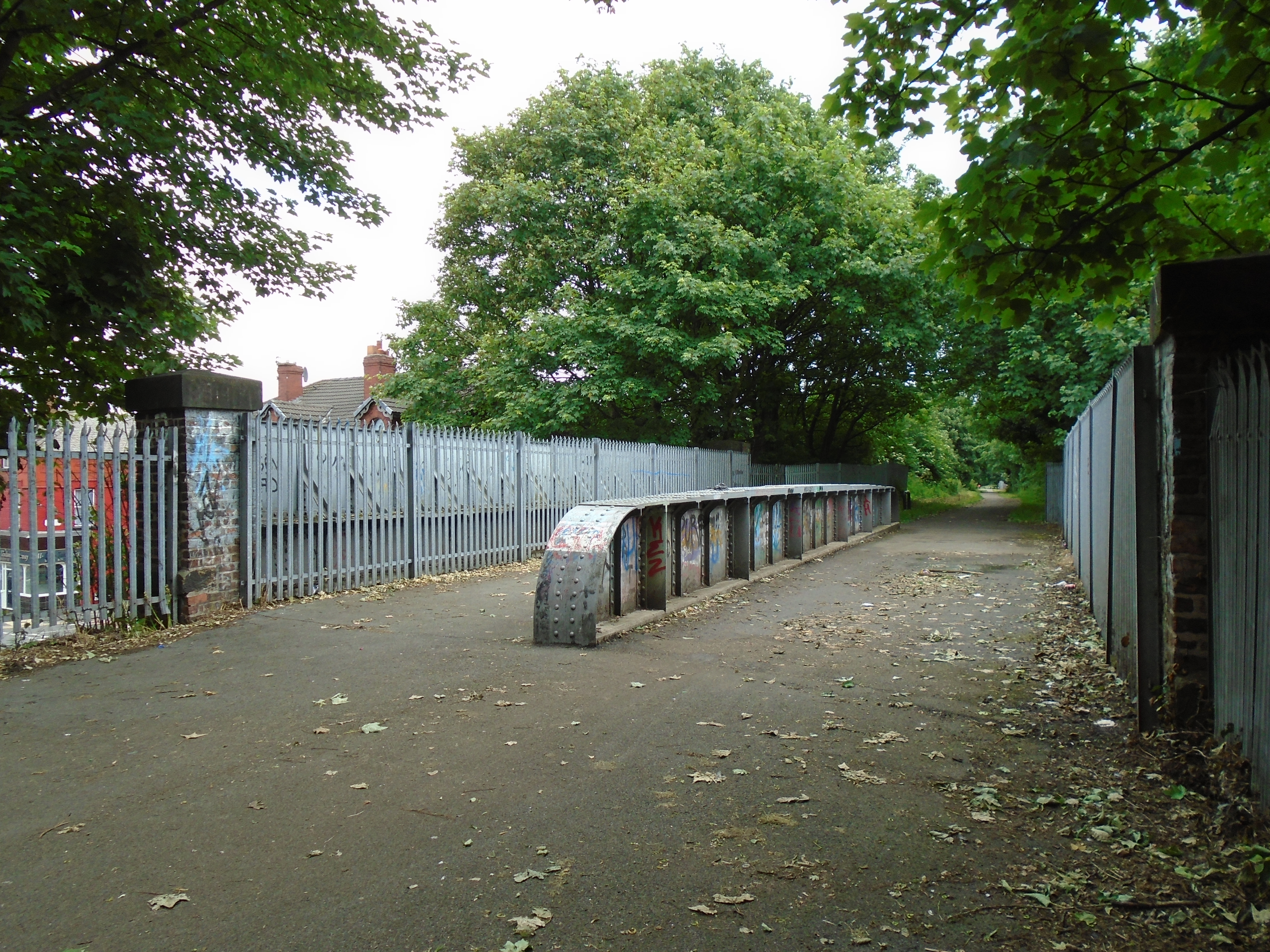
Former trackbed over Warbreck Moor, site of station in 2017.

Preceding station	Disused railways	Following station
Kirkby	Lancashire and Yorkshire Railway; North Mersey Branch	Ford
