= Dixons Fazakerley Academy =

Location
- Sherwoods Lane; Fazakerley; Liverpool, Merseyside, L10 1LB; England
- Coordinates: 53.4706°N 2.92539°W

Information
- Type: Academy
- Local authority: Liverpool City Council
- Trust: Dixons Academy Trust
- Department for Education URN: 148655 Tables
- Ofsted: Reports
- Principal: Nick Hughes
- Gender: Coeducational
- Age: 11 to 16
- Website: www.dixonsfa.com

Dixons Fazakerley Academy (formerly Fazakerley High School) is a coeducational secondary school located in the Fazakerley area of Liverpool, England.

The school is situated on a site which has been the location of various educational establishments since 1937, however the school located into new buildings on the same site in September 2003.

Previously a community school administered by Liverpool City Council, in September 2021 Fazakerley High School converted to academy status and was renamed Dixons Fazakerley Academy. It is now sponsored by the Dixons Academy Trust.

Dixons Fazakerley Academy offers GCSEs and BTECs as programmes of study for pupils. The school previously offered a sixth form provision, but this has been discontinued.
