= Gladstone Dock railway station =

Former railway station in England

Gladstone Dock

General information
- Location: Seaforth, Sefton; England
- Coordinates: 53.4583°N 3.0112°W
- Grid reference: SJ328962
- Line: North Mersey Branch
- Platforms: 1

Other information
- Status: Disused

History
- Original company: Lancashire and Yorkshire Railway
- Pre-grouping: Lancashire and Yorkshire Railway
- Post-grouping: London, Midland and Scottish Railway

Key dates
- 7 September 1914: Opened
- 1916: Renamed Gladstone Dock Halt
- 7 July 1924: Closed
- 10 June 1968: Line closed
Location

Gladstone Dock railway station was a station in Bootle, Lancashire, England, located on the North Mersey Branch. Situated west of Rimrose Road (now the A565) within the Mersey Docks and Harbour Board Estate, it was named after the nearby Gladstone Dock.

== History ==
The station was opened on 7 September 1914 by the Lancashire and Yorkshire Railway (L&YR) as a passenger terminus on its North Mersey Branch.

The station was situated on the west side of the viaduct carrying two lines of track of the branch on the way to North Mersey goods railway station which had been open since 1866.

The access to the station was from the west side of the viaduct where it crossed Shore Road, there was a flight of steps up the platform level where the booking office was situated. The single platform was of wooden construction and had no facilities other than a few benches.

The service ran to Aintree, there were seven trains each day in each direction with an extra service on Saturdays. The service was operated using twelve 45 ft (14 m) lightweight composite single power cars, usually known as orange boxes that had been built for the Southport to Dingle service over the Liverpool Overhead Railway and had become redundant when that service was withdrawn in 1914.

Unfortunately passengers seemed to have preferred using the Liverpool Overhead Railway's Seaforth Sands station and the station was closed by the London, Midland and Scottish Railway on 7 July 1924.

The line through the station site remained in use for freight up until 10 June 1968. The embankment on which the single platform station was situated has long since been demolished. There is no evidence of the station's existence.

Preceding station	Disused railways	Following station
Linacre Road; Towards Aintree	Lancashire and Yorkshire Railway; North Mersey Branch	Terminus

== Bibliography ==
- Clinker, C. R. (October 1978). Clinker's Register of Closed Passenger Stations and Goods Depots in England, Scotland and Wales 1830–1977. Bristol: Avon-Anglia Publications & Services. ISBN 0-905466-19-5. OCLC 5726624.
- Gahan, John W. (1982). Seventeen Stations to Dingle: the Liverpool Overhead Railway remembered. ISBN 0-907768-20-2.
- Gahan, John W. (1985). Seaport to Seaside: Lines to Southport and Ormskirk - 13 decades of trains and travel. ISBN 978-0-907768-07-5.
- Gell, Rob (1985). An illustrated survey of Liverpool's railway stations, 1830-1985. Crosby, England: Heyday Pub. ISBN 978-0-947562-03-8. OCLC 655445796.
- Marsden, Colin (2008). The DC Electrics. Hersham: Oxford Publishing. ISBN 978-0-86093-615-2.
- Marshall, John (1969). The Lancashire & Yorkshire Railway. Vol. 1. Newton Abbot: David & Charles. ISBN 978-0-7153-4352-4.
- Marshall, John (1970). The Lancashire & Yorkshire Railway. Vol. 2. Newton Abbot: David & Charles. ISBN 978-0-7153-4906-9.
- Quick, Michael (2023) [2001]. Railway passenger stations in Great Britain: a chronology (PDF). version 5.05. Railway & Canal Historical Society.
