= Lyn Andrews =

British novelist

Lyn Andrews (born 1943) is the pen name used by British novelist Lynda M. Andrews. Her stories centre mainly around Liverpool and Ireland.

== Early life ==
Andrews was born and raised in the Liverpool suburb of Fazakerley, She is the only daughter of Joseph and Monica Ormesher. Her mother was a hairdresser who later remarried when Lyn was three years old. Lyn's stepfather was Frank Moore, a police officer. She was educated at the Convent of Notre-Dame at Everton Valley where she did not excel at English but had a passion for history and literature, eventually earning 5 O-levels.

She then trained as short-hand typist at a well-rated commercial college in Colquitt Street. After graduating, she became a secretary at the Lily Cups company in Aintree and married her husband Robert, a policeman from Fazakerley. At that time she was living in Fazakerley. Andrews remembers, "In those days I never did any writing at all. I didn't want to be a writer."

She quit her job after about three years at Lily Cups when she became pregnant. Giving birth to triplets, a daughter Helen and two sons Paul and Keith, she raised her family and started to publish novels.

== Career ==
Currently, Lyn is one of the top one hundred bestselling authors in the UK, reaching No. 1 on the Sunday Times paperback best-seller list. In 1993, she was shortlisted for the Romantic Novel of the year Award. To date she has written 31 original novels and is a popular novelist in the North of England.

== Personal life ==
Lyn Andrews was born in Liverpool in September 1943. Her father was killed on D-Day when Lyn was 9 months old. When Lyn was 3 her mother Monica married Frank Moore, who became 'dad' to Lyn. She was a secretary before she married husband, Bob Andrews, a policeman. In 1970, she gave birth to triplets, two sons and a daughter. She lived in Ireland for 11 years and is now resident on the Isle of Man, but spends as much time as possible back on Merseyside, seeing her children and grandchildren.

== Bibliography ==
- The White Empress (1989)
- The Sisters O'Donnell (1990)
- Liverpool Lou (1991)
- Ellan Vannin (1991)
- The Leaving of Liverpool (1992)
- Maggie May (1993)
- Mist Over the Mersey (1994)
- Mersey Blues (1995)
- Liverpool Lamplight (1996)
- Liverpool Songbird (1996)
- From this day forth (1997)
- Where the Mersey Flows (1997)
- Angels of Mercy (1998)
- When Tomorrow Dawns (1998)
- The Ties That Bind (1999)
- Take These Broken Wings (1999)
- My Sister's Child (2000)
- The House on Lonely Street (2001)
- Love and a Promise (2002)
- A Wing and a Prayer (2002)
- When Daylight Comes (2003)
- Across a Summer Sea (2003)
- A Mother's Love (2004)
- Every Mother's Son (2005)
- Friends Forever (2005)
- Far from Home (2006)
- Days of Hope (2008)
- A Daughter's Journey (2008)
- A Secret in the Family (2009)
- To Love and to Cherish (2010)
- Beyond a Misty Shore (2011)
- The Liverpool Matchgirl (2018)
