= North Mersey Branch =

Railway line in Liverpool, England

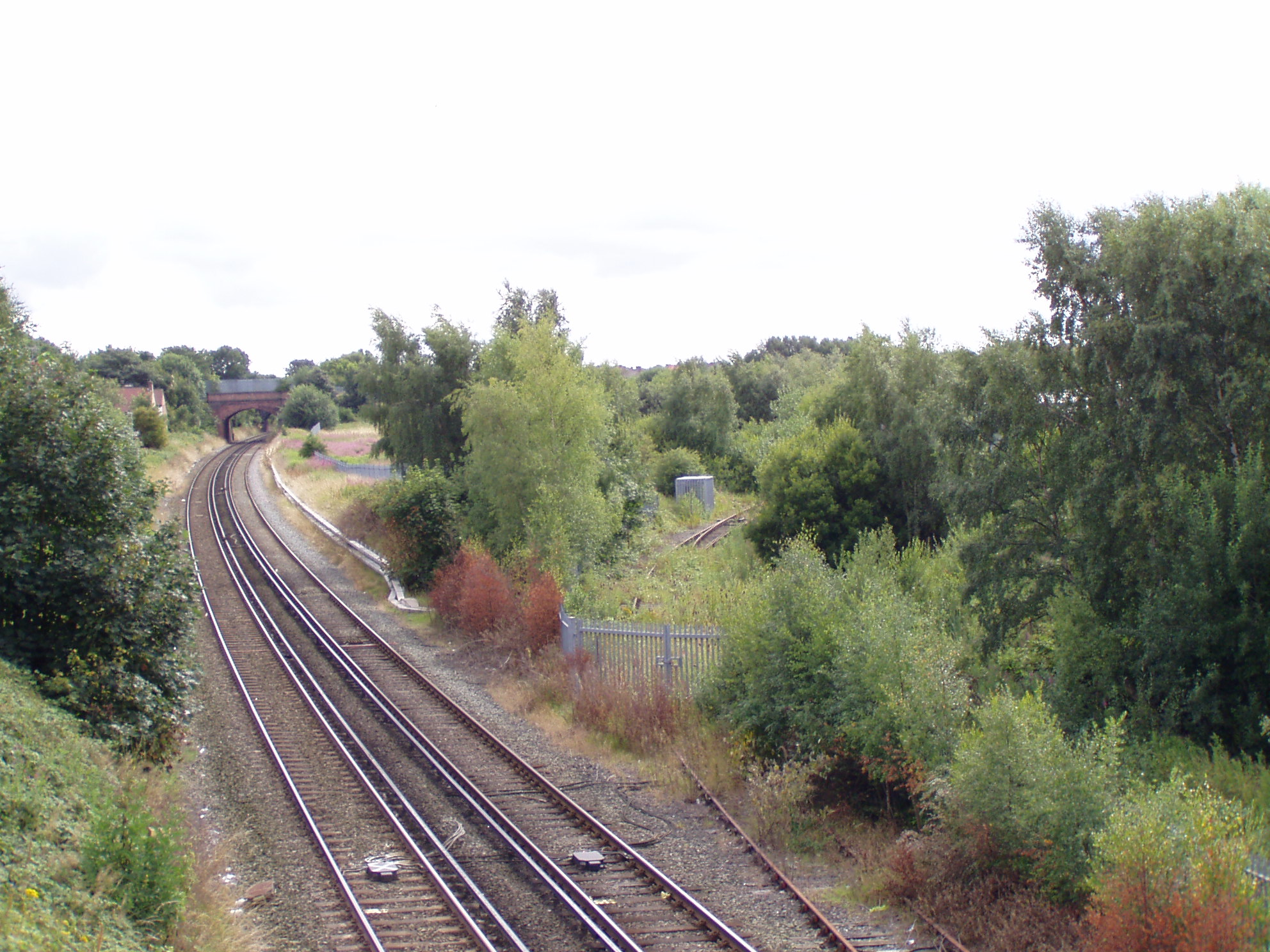
- Branch leaves the Merseyrail Northern line south of Aintree Station

Overview
- Status: Engineering trains only
- Owner: Network Rail
- Locale: Sefton, Merseyside
- Termini: Fazakerley Junction; North Mersey and Alexandra Docks
- Stations: 5

Service
- Type: Heavy rail
- System: National Rail

History
- Opened: 1866

Technical
- Line length: 4 miles 46 chains (7.4 km)
- Number of tracks: Single (1)
- Track gauge: 1,435 mm (4 ft 8 1/2 in)
- Loading gauge: W6
- Electrification: Not electrified
- Operating speed: 20 mph (32 km/h) maximum

The North Mersey Branch (NMB) is a railway line that was constructed by the Lancashire and Yorkshire Railway to connect its mainline (the former Liverpool and Bury Railway) with the northern Mersey dock system.

== History ==
The Lancashire and Yorkshire Railway built this 4 miles 46 chains (7.4 km) long double-track branch line to capture some of the increasing freight passing through Hornby Dock, Alexandra Dock and the Canada Dock systems at the northern end of the Mersey docks. (Note: Railways in the United Kingdom are, for historical reasons, measured in miles and chains. A chain is 22 yards (20 m) long, there are 80 chains to the mile.)

The scheme was authorised in May 1861, a contract was let to George Thomson in 1864 and the line opened on 27 August 1866. (Note: An Act to enable the Lancashire and Yorkshire Railway Company to make a Railway from Aintree to Bootle, with certain Branch Railways, all in Lancashire; and for other Purposes relating to the same Company. Local Act, 24 & 25 Victoria I, c. xxxiv.)

The line initially had no stations, it ran from a new Fazakerley junction between Kirkby and Fazakerley on the former Liverpool and Bury Railway terminating in the North Mersey goods yard where an end-on connection was made to the Mersey Docks and Harbour Board (MDHB) rail network which gave the L&YR access to the docks further south. North Mersey goods railway station opened in 1866, albeit without buildings until the 1880s, being renamed to North Mersey and Alexandra Docks in 1892.

Part of the branch was electrified in 1906 as the L&YR tried to win back traffic lost to competition from trams. It was electrified between Marsh Lane (on the former Liverpool, Crosby and Southport Railway) and Aintree Sefton Arms (on the former Liverpool, Ormskirk and Preston Railway) using the Seaforth connecting line and the Aintree curve.

Two stations were opened on 1 June 1906 on the newly electrified section at Linacre Road and Ford.

The branch was connected via a crossover to the Liverpool Overhead Railway (LOR) a little to the east of Seaforth Sands creating Rimrose Road junction. The connection was used by a short-lived service between Aintree and Dingle at the southern end of the LOR, it was not successful and only lasted for two years from 1906 to 1908.

By 1910 18 trains were operating each way, each day, along the branch with trains terminating at Liverpool Exchange in the south and Aintree Sefton Arms, where 10 services terminated, and Maghull to which the other 8 carried on.

Gladstone Dock station opened on 7 September 1914, when the section of track to it from North Mersey Branch Junction (the junction where the Seaforth Connecting line left the branch) was electrified, it became a halt in 1916 and closed on 7 July 1924.

In 1922 the branch had seven daily services (eight on Saturdays, none on Sundays) between Aintree Sefton Arms and Gladstone Dock, and fifteen daily services (fourteen on Saturdays, nine on Sundays) running from Liverpool Exchange to Aintree Sefton Arms.

Linacre Road and Ford closed on 2 April 1951. The line was de-electrified in 1966.

== Aintree races ==
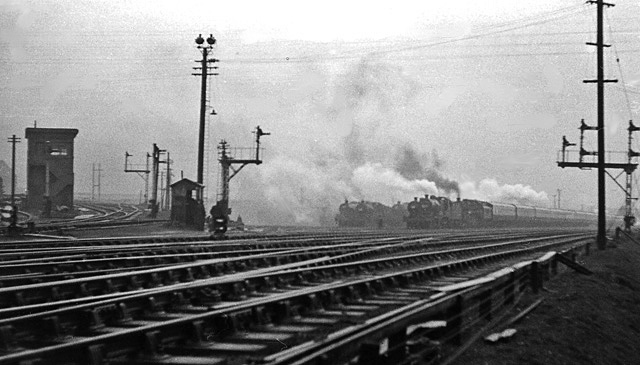
Grand National Race Specials in 1955.

The branch was used to get passengers to race meetings at Aintree Racecourse especially for the Grand National in several ways. Excursion trains were run to a temporary, race-meeting only station, first noted in 1878, on the line called Aintree Cinder Lane.

Cinder Lane was replaced by Aintree Racecourse station and was officially renamed in 1910, it also only operated on race days, it saw its last service on 25 March 1961.

Annual Grand National Express services ran from London Euston and other locations, such as Bridlington, Hull and Goole, direct to racecourse station via the North Mersey Branch. These excursion trains all arrived travelling westwards, discharged their passengers, went to Aintree sorting sidings for servicing then all departed eastbound after the race meeting, the line being made one way and single track for the duration of the meeting.

In 1988 BR decided to cancel the Grand National Express permanently, due to attacks by vandals along the line. Bricks and other missiles would be hurled at the trains when coming down the line in Litherland on the old site of the North Mersey Junction at the end of the crossover above the Merseyrail Northern Line.; and too many trains and coaches were arriving at Aintree with significant damage.

Other special services were run along the branch to Aintree Sefton Arms (on these occasions the L&YR stations at Aintree were differentiated by adding Sefton Arms or Racecourse) in addition to the regular service from Liverpool Exchange

The Liverpool Overhead Railway also ran trains from its line onto the branch using the connection at Seaforth Sands, in 1955 they ran nine specials from Dingle.

== Usage/Freight ==
Intermodal and engineering trains ran from Garston, Edge Hill and as far away as Southampton, along the North Mersey Branch to Aintree Container Base, Aintree Metal Box and Fazakerley permanent-way yard.

In 1986 the line to Aintree Container Base was cut, leaving no further need for container trains along the line. In 1987 the short spur to Fazakerley sidings was closed, and the Metal Box service had finished by 1991, leaving no regular goods services on the North Mersey Branch.

== Today ==
The line from Bootle junction to Aintree station junction (that is the whole branch) was taken out of use on 19 April 2002.

The section of the line between Sefton Junction and North Mersey Branch Junction is no longer maintained to basic Network Rail operational standards and as of December 2017 is completely overgrown in places.

In January 2024, the entirety of the overgrown trackside that once occupied the site of Aintree West sidings, was cleared completely back down to the soil after almost a decade of overgrowth. The clearance was undertaken by a private contractor, that was later said to have nothing to do with Network Rail. Despite the trackside land being cleared, the track itself was left untouched.

Occasionally diesel-powered engineering/maintenance trains used the branch to access the Southport line, saving the need to reverse at Sandhills.

For trains to access the branch, a key must first be obtained in advance from the Merseyrail IECC signalling centre which unlocks the gate allowing access to/from the branch line at Aintree.

== Future ==
Plans to open this section as part of Merseyrail's Northern Line have been put forward in Sefton's transport plan, with the first details to emerge about its possible reopening being published by the media on 28 February 2008.

The Crosby Herald newspaper reported that the line could be reopened in conjunction with a proposed new stadium for Liverpool F.C., to provide additional transport links via the town of Litherland, likely to cost millions.

This was again mentioned in Merseytravel's 30-year plan of 2014.

In January 2019, Campaign for Better Transport released a report identifying the line which was listed as Priority 2 for reopening. Priority 2 is for those lines which require further development or a change in circumstances (such as housing developments).

North Mersey Branch
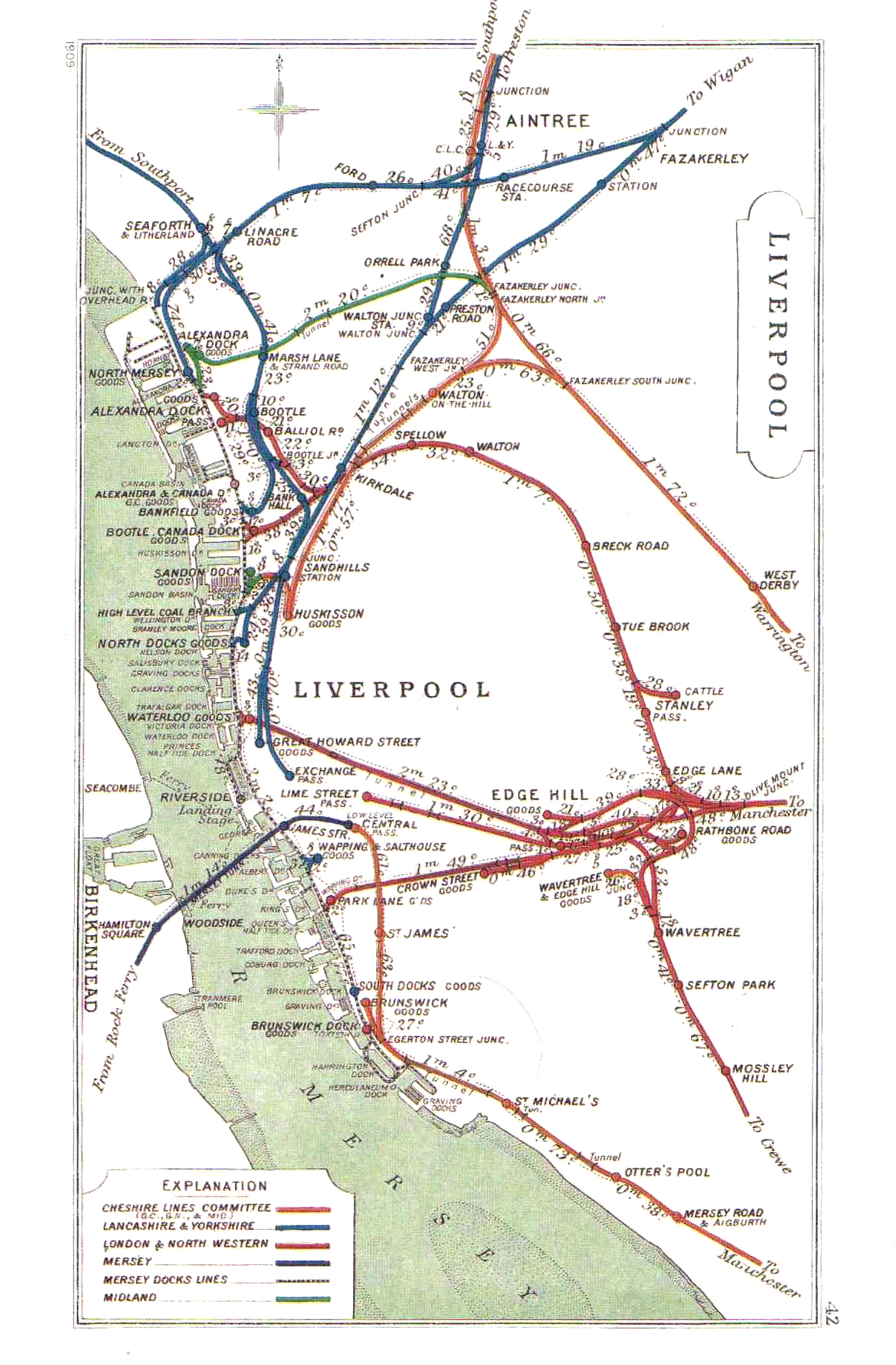
Junction Diagram showing railways around Liverpool. The North Mersey branch is shown in blue, running roughly east–west near the top.

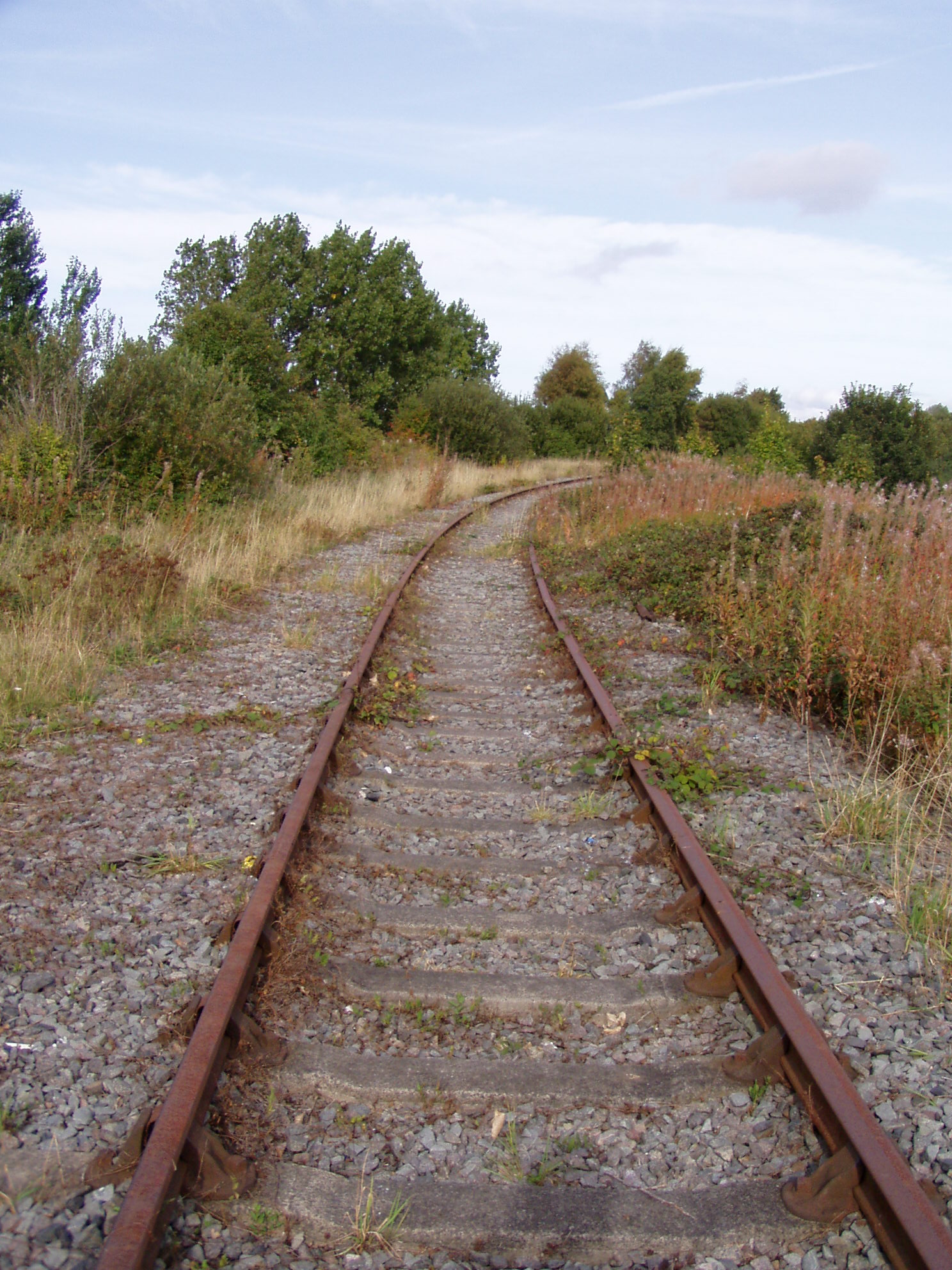
North Mersey branch looking east from crossing the Southport line

The branch in January 2018.

The branch in January 2018.
