= North Mersey and Alexandra Docks railway station =

Former railway station in England

North Mersey & Alexandra Docks

General information
- Location: Bootle; Sefton; England
- Coordinates: 53.45161°N 3.00776°W
- Grid reference: SJ 331 954

Other information
- Status: Disused

History
- Original company: L&YR
- Pre-grouping: L&YR
- Post-grouping: LMS

Key dates
- 27 August 1866: Opened as North Mersey without buildings
- 1884: Buildings completed
- 1 August 1892: Renamed North Mersey & Alexandra Docks
- 10 June 1968: Closed
Location

North Mersey station opened on 27 August 1866 as the terminus of the North Mersey Branch of the L&YR. The station was for goods only and initially there was an extensive goods yard at the foot of the descent down to river level and alongside the slope. A four-storey warehouse, loading mound and goods sheds was constructed between 1881 and 1884.

The station was renamed North Mersey & Alexandra Docks station on 1 August 1892.

By 1894 the yard was equipped with a 5-ton crane.

The station was situated on Regent Road, immediately inland from Hornby Dock and Alexandra Dock 3. The station was connected to the North Mersey Branch at its northern end, to the south it was connected to the Mersey Docks and Harbour Board (MDHB) rail network which gave access to more dock facilities.

The warehouse was extended in 1900 after a tender was let in 1899.

Timber traffic passing through the local docks grew around the turn of the century and an extensive timber yard was laid out in 1904 to handle it, in 1907 the yard was fitted with an electric cantilever crane of 10 tons capacity. The crane, built by the local firm of Muskers had a 28-foot track gauge, a transverse span of 172 feet, a traverse of 1,620 feet and was capable of stacking timers to a height of 40 feet.

In 1917—1918 the station was used as a transit depot for American troops, they disembarked and were put straight on trains without setting foot in the city.

The North Mersey depot was adjacent to the massive grain elevators of the Liverpool Grain Storage and Transit Company, and later the 2,858,000 cubic feet of cold storage constructed at the end of Alexandra Dock 3. In 1929 the warehouse was reported to be 94,500 square feet capacity.

After it opened in 1927 the station served the Gladstone Dock where the largest Atlantic liners were berthed.

The timber yard crane was dismantled after 10 September 1952.

The station closed to all traffic on 10 June 1968.

Preceding station	Disused railways	Following station
Gladstone Dock	Lancashire and Yorkshire Railway; North Mersey Branch	MDHC railway
