= Fazakerley =

Suburb of Liverpool, in Merseyside, England

Coordinates: 53.4676°N 2.9408°W

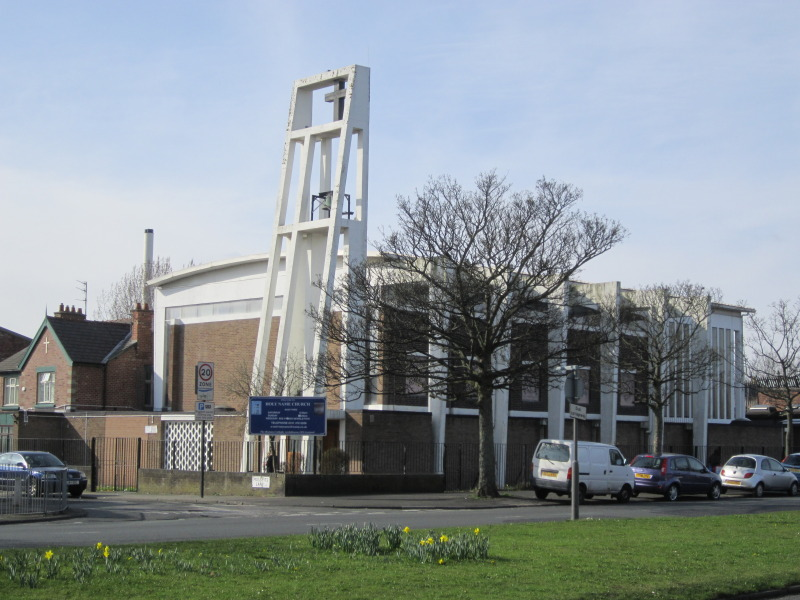
- Holy Name Church

- Location within Merseyside
- Population: 16,786 (2011 Census)
- OS grid reference: SJ376971
- Metropolitan borough: Liverpool
- Metropolitan county: Merseyside
- Region: North West
- Country: England
- Sovereign state: United Kingdom
- Post town: LIVERPOOL
- Postcode district: L9, L10
- Dialling code: 0151
- Police: Merseyside
- Fire: Merseyside
- Ambulance: North West
- UK Parliament: Liverpool Walton

Fazakerley /fəˈzækərli/ is a suburb of north Liverpool, in Merseyside, England. It is part of the Liverpool Walton parliamentary constituency. At the 2011 Census, it had a population of 16,786.

== Description ==
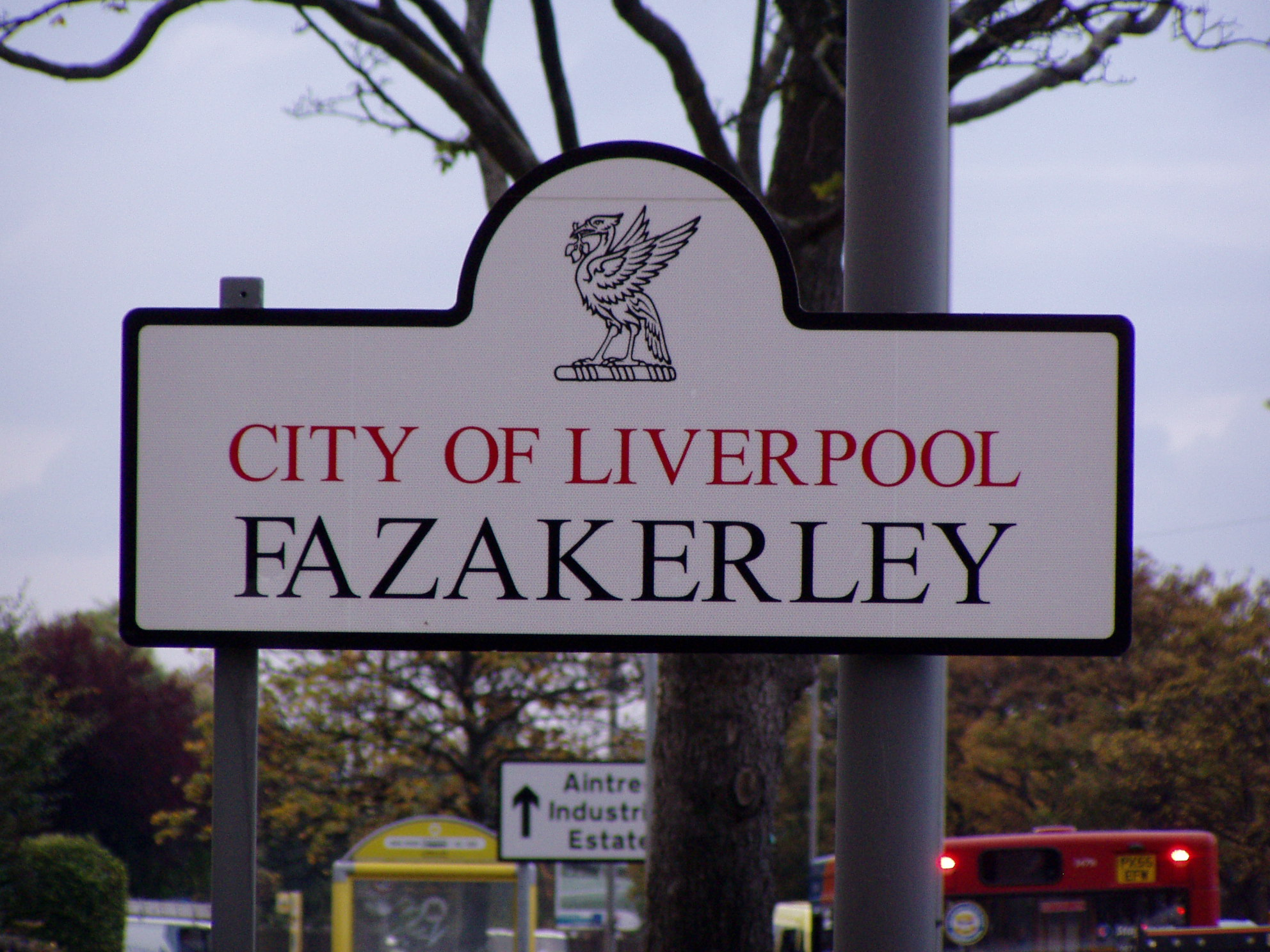

Fazakerley is in north Liverpool; neighbouring districts include Croxteth, Gillmoss, Aintree and Kirkby. It includes Fazakerley railway station, Altcourse Prison, Aintree University Hospital and Dixons Fazakerley Academy

== History ==
Fazakerley takes its name from Anglo-Saxon root words—all descriptive words pertaining to land; *Fæs-æcer-lēah. This can be broken down to fæs (border or fringe), æcer (field) and lēah, meaning a wood or clearing.

In 1321, Fazakerley was described as follows: "the country is extremely flat and treeless, with nothing to recommend it to the passer-by, for it seems to be a district of straight lines, devoid of any beauty." It had an area of 1,709 acres (6.92 km^{2}); it was separated from Walton by a brook and from West Derby partly by Sugar Brook up to Stone bridge.

Fazakerley was formerly a township in the parish of Walton-on-the-Hill; in 1866, Fazakerley became a separate civil parish and the parish was abolished and merged with Liverpool on 1 April 1922. In 1921, the parish had a population of 6,055.

The suburb was once home to a Royal Ordnance Factories plant at ROF Fazakerley, which manufactured weapons such as the Lee–Enfield rifle, Sten and Sterling submachine guns both during and after World War II. The ROF started shutting down in June 1960 and it was fully shutdown by December 1960 it was transformed into housing and the Aintree Industrial Estate

== Transport ==
Fazakerley railway station is a stop on the Headbolt Lane branch of the Northern Line on the Merseyrail network. It is generally served by four trains per hour between Liverpool Central and Headbolt Lane; in late evenings and on Sundays, services are reduced to two trains per hour in each direction.

Fazakerley also has a fairly extensive bus service network focused on two main routes provided by Stagecoach Merseyside & South Lancashire. The 17/17A/17X via Utting Avenue/Townsend Avenue and 20/21 via Black Bull/County Road linking Fazakerley to Liverpool City Centre with all 20/21 and some 17A journey's extended to nearby Kirkby. The 17's and 20/21's have been long established over a number decades, albeit with changes to them over the years. Other services include Arriva Merseyside's 62 Bootle - Penny Lane and 63 Fazakerley Aintree University Hospital - Crosby which link the area to South/East Liverpool (62) and Sefton (62/63) and the Merseytravel supported 36 Fazakerley Aintree University Hospital - Maghull, 102 Fazakerley Aintree University Hospital - Broadgreen Hospital/Page Moss and 121/214/215 Aintree/Walton Circulars which link most of the areas local to Fazakerley and beyond in Sefton, East Liverpool and Knowsley and these services are all run by HTL Buses. The running of these services may change in 2027/28 when Liverpool City Region Combined Authority completes it's rollout of the Metro brand and assumes control of Merseytravel and bus services throughout the Merseyside region.

Fazakerley is also approximately 1.5 miles away from Junction 6 of the M57 motorway which provides links to the M62 and M58 motorways and becomes the A5300 Knowsley Expressway at Tarbock Island.

== In popular culture ==
The 1983 Yorkshire Television drama One Summer was partially set in Fazakerley.

== Notable residents ==
- Lyn Andrews, novelist
- Stuart Barlow, football coach and former professional player
- Andy Brown, lead singer of Lawson
- Neil Buchanan, musician and TV presenter
- Mike Bulger, guitarist/songwriter (The Christians/Sugarcide/Here's Johnny/Lalabambam)
- Stephen Bunting, Professional Darts Corporation player
- Brenda M King, textile historian
- Rickie Lambert, football coach and former professional player
- Lauren McQueen, actress
- Owen Moran, lead singer of Cook da Books
- David Pownall, playwright and novelist (1938-2022)
- Steve Rotheram, Lord Mayor of Liverpool (2008–09), former MP for Liverpool Walton
- Jack Spriggs, Lord Mayor of Liverpool (2002–03).

== See also ==
- Dixons Fazakerley Academy
- Everton Cemetery, contains listed buildings
- Walton Centre
