= Aintree railway station =

Railway station on the Ormskirk Branch of the Northern Line in Liverpool, England

Aintree
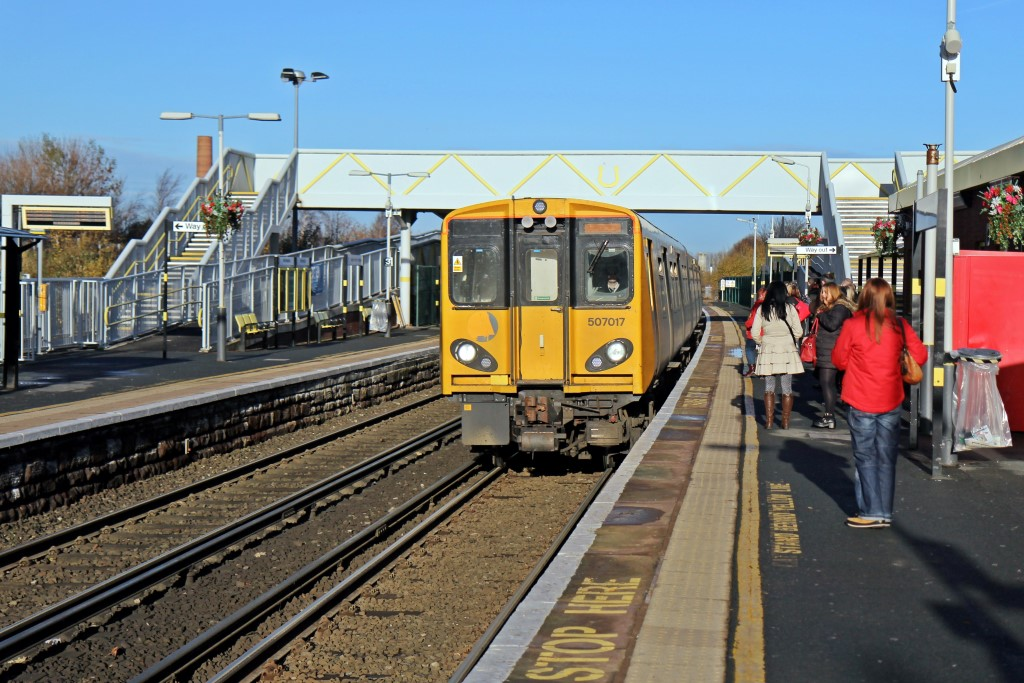

General information
- Location: Aintree, Sefton; England
- Coordinates: 53.4740°N 2.9563°W
- Grid reference: SJ366978
- Manager: Merseyrail
- Transit authority: Merseytravel
- Platforms: 2

Other information
- Station code: AIN
- Fare zone: C1/C3
- Classification: DfT category E

Key dates
- 2 April 1849: Opened
- ?: Renamed Aintree Sefton Arms
- 6 May 1968: Renamed Aintree

Passengers
- 2021/22: ▲0.726 million
- 2022/23: ▲0.842 million
- 2023/24: ▲0.909 million
- 2024/25: ▲0.977 million
- 2025/26: ▲1.001 million
Location
Notes
- Passenger statistics from the Office of Rail and Road

Merseyrail map

Aintree railway station is a railway station that serves the village of Aintree, Merseyside, England. It is on the Ormskirk branch of the Merseyrail network's Northern Line. Until 1968 it was known as Aintree Sefton Arms after a nearby public house. The station's design reflects that it is the closest station to Aintree Racecourse, where the annual Grand National horse race takes place.

== History ==
Opened by the East Lancashire Railway in April 1849, then taken over by the Lancashire and Yorkshire Railway ten years later, it became part of the London, Midland and Scottish Railway during the Grouping of 1923. The line then passed on to the London Midland Region of British Railways on nationalisation in 1948.

The L&YR electrified both routes from Liverpool Exchange in 1906 (two years after a successful trial of the system on the neighbouring line to Southport), extending it subsequently as far as Ormskirk by 1913. The western end of the North Mersey Branch from Gladstone Dock & Bootle (which had opened in 1866 and joined the main line immediately south of the station) was also equipped with the third rail in 1914, though Gladstone Dock station only remained open for passenger trains until July 1924. Services henceforth ran to Bootle Oriel Road and on to Exchange until they were withdrawn by the British Transport Commission on 2 April 1951. The main line via Walton was also used by longer distance local & express trains from Exchange to Preston, Blackpool, Scotland and East Lancashire in addition to the intensive electric commuter service and some of these also stopped at Aintree, especially when the nearby race course hosted the famous Grand National meeting.

The Ormskirk line was not included in the list of routes to be closed in the 1963 Beeching Report (unlike the other two routes from Liverpool Exchange), but the route was subsequently reviewed by BR and reprieved in 1966. This came at some cost though, as all through trains between Liverpool, Preston and East Lancashire were to be either re-routed via Wigan North Western to Liverpool Lime Street or withdrawn altogether. These alterations were mainly carried out in 1969, with all through running beyond Ormskirk ceasing from 4 May 1970. Exchange then closed to passengers on 30 April 1977, with services henceforth being integrated into the Merseyrail Northern Line and running via the new Link tunnel to Liverpool Central from the following Monday (2 May).

The North Mersey line lost its connection into the docks in 1971, though it remained in use to serve a permanent way depot at Fazakerley until 1987 and for periodic engineers trains to/from Bootle and Edge Hill thereafter. It has seen no traffic since 2005, but Merseytravel has long-term ambitions to reopen it to passenger trains (as stated in the Liverpool City Region Long Term Rail Strategy published in 2014).

When Sectorisation was introduced, the station was served by Regional Railways on behalf of the Merseyside PTE until the Privatisation of British Railways.

== Facilities ==
The station is staffed throughout the day, with the ticket office open from the beginning of timetabled service until 00:10 each evening (seven days per week). A waiting room and food/drink vending machines are provided in the main building, along with shelters on both sides. Train running information is offered by automated announcements, digital display screens and timetable posters. Step-free access is available to both platforms (via the ramped footbridge for northbound trains). There is car parking for 104 vehicles and secure cycle storage for 32 bikes.

== Services ==
On Mondays to Saturdays, trains run every 15 minutes towards Liverpool Central and every 15 minutes towards Ormskirk. On race days, the trains have 6 carriages (two trains coupled together). During the Grand National meeting, additional trains run to the station from Liverpool city centre. Connections for stations to Preston are available at Ormskirk.

In the evening and on Sundays, trains call every 30 minutes in each direction.

== Gallery ==
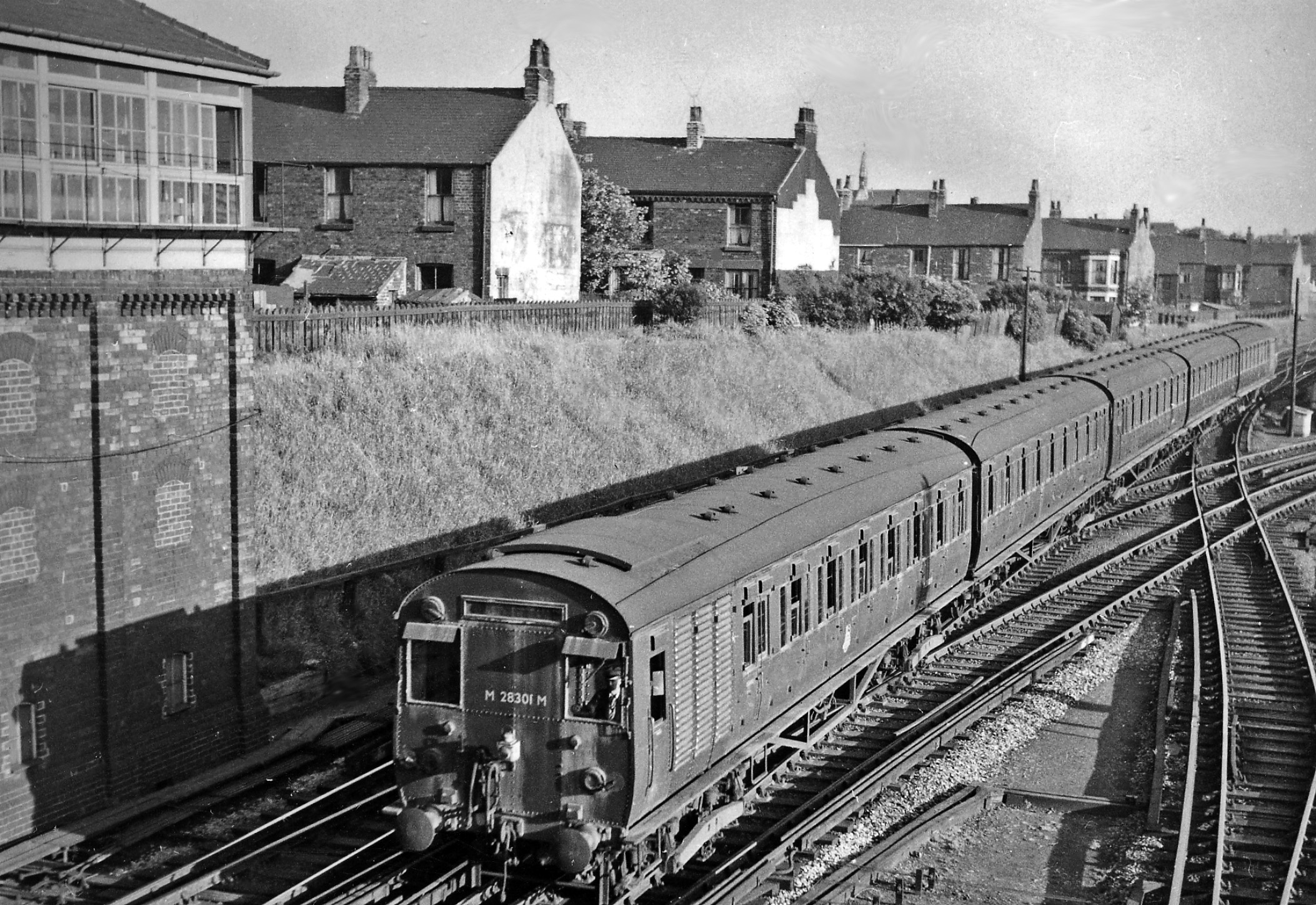
An LMS 630v EMU approaching in 1959.

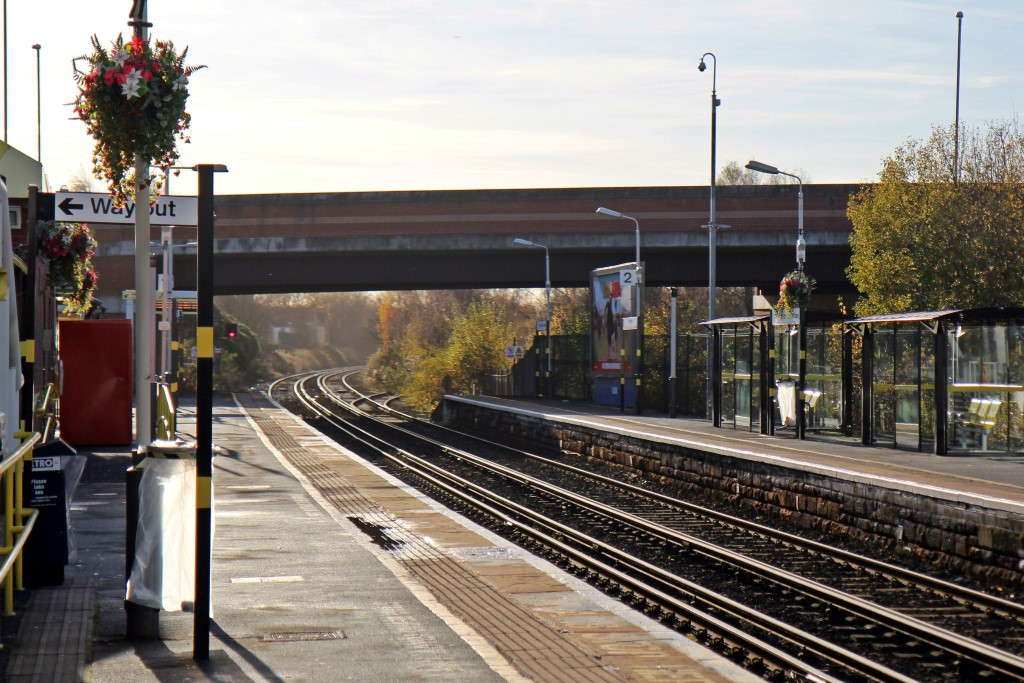
The view south along the Liverpool-bound platform.

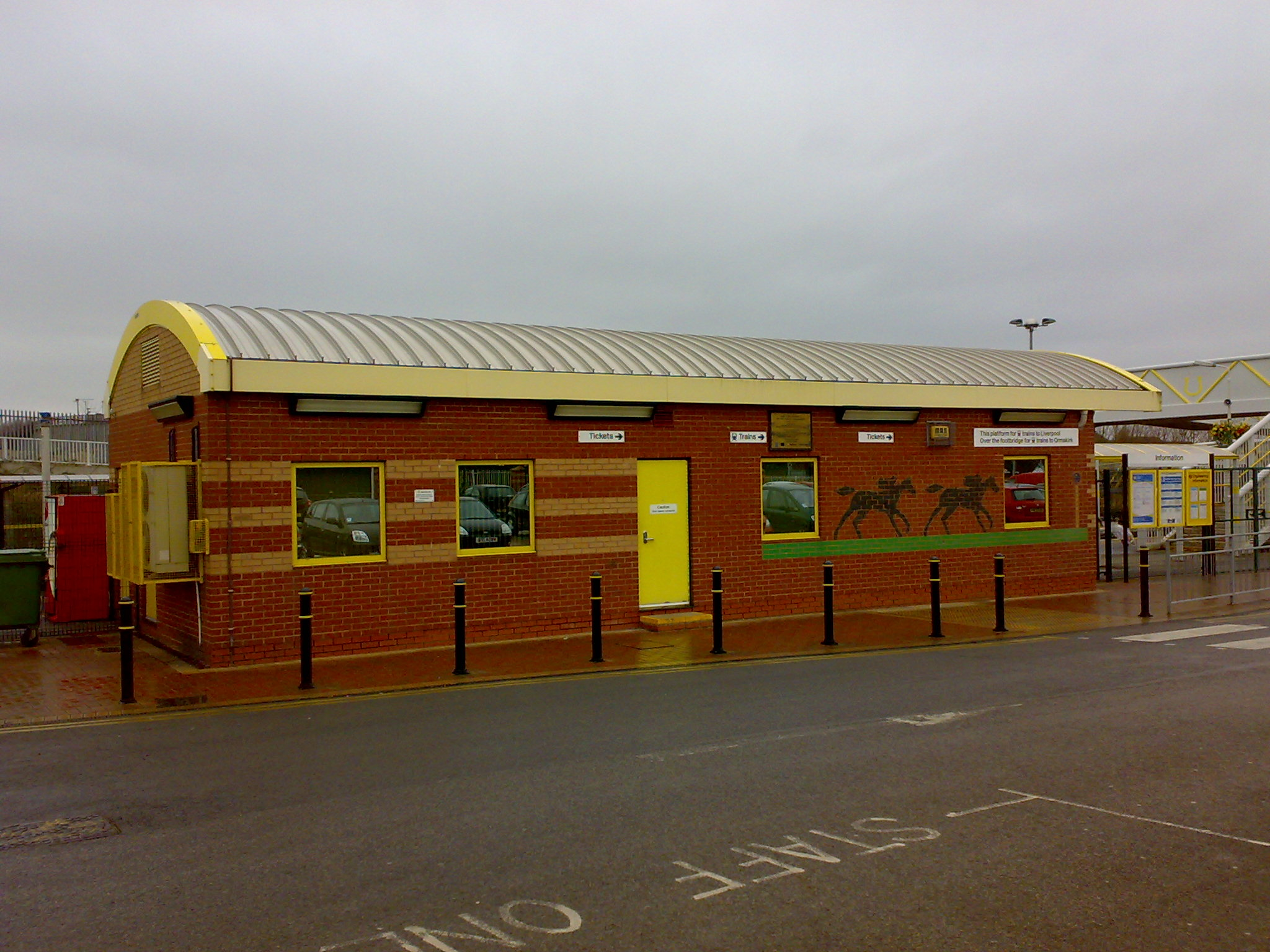
The station building viewed from the car park.

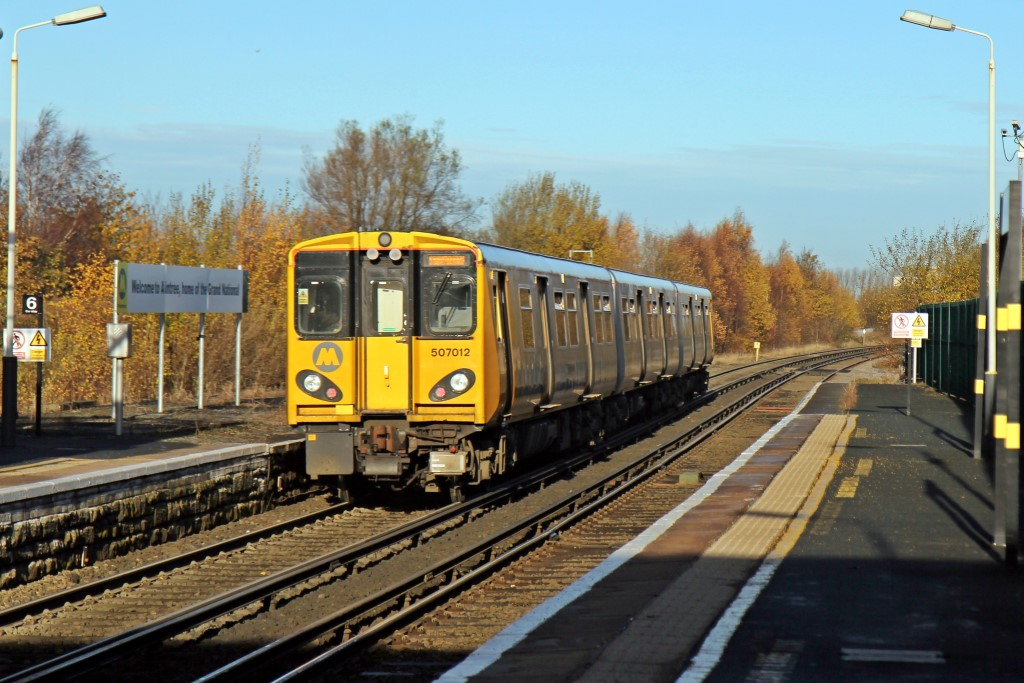
A Merseyrail Class 507 departs with a service.

Preceding station	National Rail	Following station
Old Roan towards Ormskirk	Merseyrail; Northern Line	Orrell Park towards Liverpool Central
	Disused railways	
Terminus	Lancashire and Yorkshire Railway; North Mersey Branch	Ford
