= Liverpool Exchange railway station =

Disused railway station in Liverpool, England

Liverpool Exchange

General information
- Other names: Liverpool Tithebarn Street
- Location: Tithebarn Street, Liverpool, Merseyside, England
- Coordinates: 53.4093°N 2.9907°W
- Grid reference: SJ343908
- Platforms: 10

Other information
- Status: Disused

History
- Original company: Lancashire and Yorkshire Railway and East Lancashire Railway
- Pre-grouping: Lancashire and Yorkshire Railway
- Post-grouping: London, Midland and Scottish Railway

Key dates
- 13 May 1850: Station opened
- 13 August 1859: Renamed Liverpool Exchange
- 2 July 1888: Station rebuilt
- 29 April 1977: Station closed
Location

Liverpool Exchange was a railway station located in the city centre of Liverpool, England. Of the four terminus stations in the city, Exchange was the only not accessed via a tunnel.

The station was damaged during World War II and lost a proportion of the trainshed roof, which was never rebuilt. The station's long-distance services were switched to Liverpool Lime Street in the 1960s, and, as a terminus, the station became redundant in the late 1970s, when its remaining local services switched to the newly opened Merseyrail tunnels under Liverpool city centre. It was closed in 1977, being replaced by the new Moorfields underground station nearby.

== First station ==
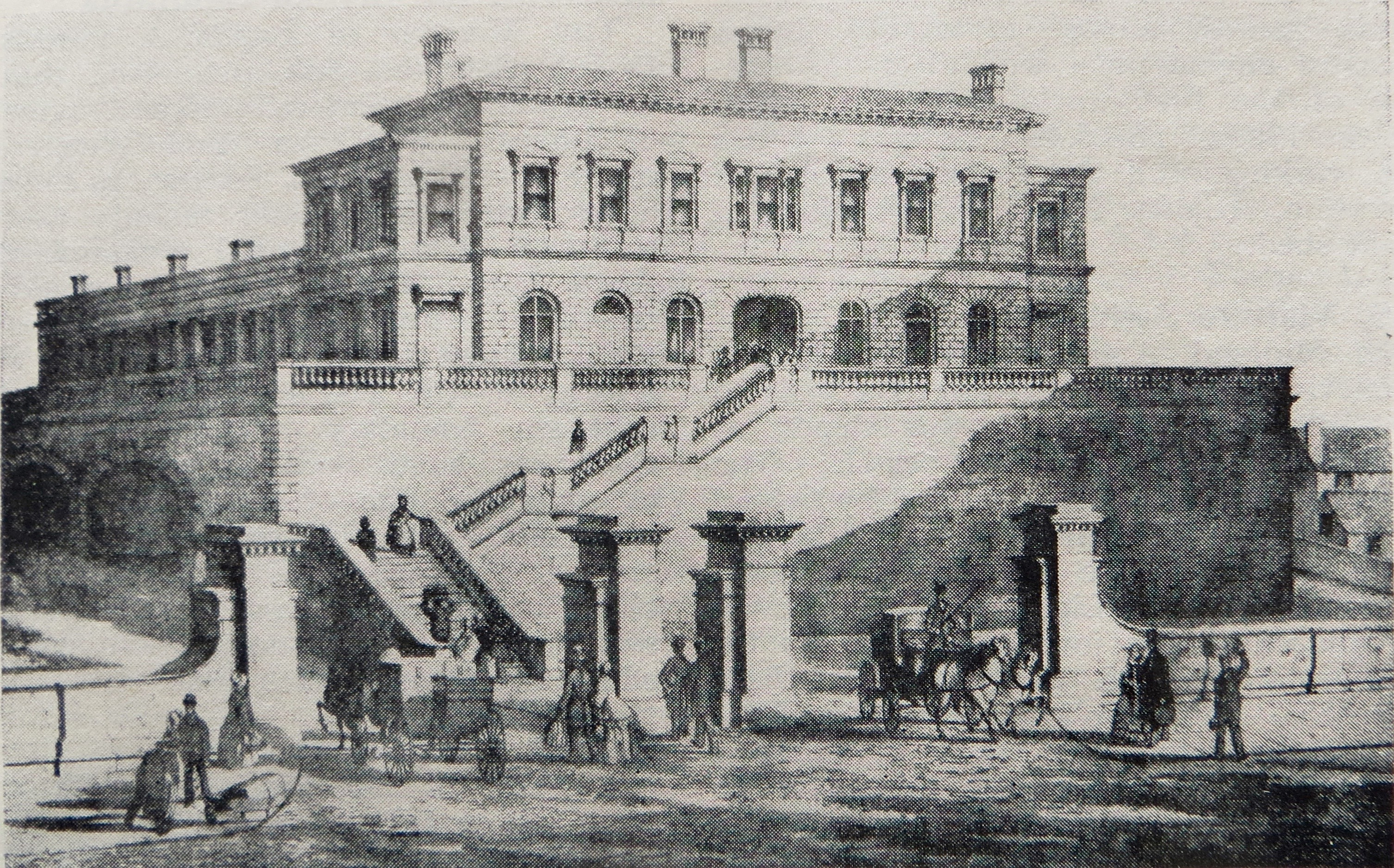
Tithebarn Street as it was between opening in 1850 and 1859

The grandly-appointed station was jointly owned and operated by the Lancashire and Yorkshire Railway (L&YR) and East Lancashire Railway (ELR), it opened on 13 May 1850, replacing an earlier temporary terminus at Liverpool Great Howard Street/Liverpool Borough Gaol a half-mile (0.8 km) further out of Liverpool. On opening it was described as being second in architectural effect to none in Liverpool, yet it has been completed in the short space of six months.

The first section of the extension involved crossing the concurrently being built London and North Western Railway (L&NWR) Waterloo goods line which emerged from Waterloo tunnel immediately south of Liverpool Great Howard Street/Liverpool Borough Gaol. To span the L&NWR branch John Hawkshaw, the chief engineer of the L&YR, designed two bridges, one, described in the Illustrated London News as being of large span and exquisite workmanship was a wedge-shaped brick arch 135 ft (41 m) wide at the north end and 200 ft (61 m) wide at the south end, on a level with the passenger station and about 60 ft (18 m) above the L&NWR lines.

The other bridge was a large bridge close to the mouth of the L&NWR Waterloo tunnel, this comprised seventeen cast-iron arched girders and had a span of 150 ft (46 m) at ground level.

The station had two names, as did its predecessor, because the joint owners could not agree on a name. The L&YR named the station Liverpool Exchange Station with the ELR naming the station Liverpool Tithebarn Street.

The lines into the station were carried on a brick-built viaduct with several bridges over roads and the Leeds and Liverpool Canal, the lines were 25 ft (7.6 m) above Tithebarn Street and the station itself rose to 90 ft (27 m) above the street so that it had to be approached by an inclined road, it was fronted by a balustraded terrace approached from below by an ornamental stairway.

The main two-storey building façade facing onto Tithebarn Street was 117 ft (36 m) long with two single-storey wings at right-angles each 193 ft (59 m) long, the L&YR occupying the western (Bixteth Street) side of the station and the ELR having the eastern (Key Street) side. Each company had completely separate facilities with the exception that there was only one arrival platform which was located on the extreme eastern side. The ELR were not happy about this arrangement as it meant L&YR trains shunting across their side of the station to get to their own side often causing delays to ELR trains.

Each side of the station had booking offices, refreshment rooms, waiting rooms etc. each company having two departure platforms covered by iron and glass roofs designed and built by Fox, Henderson & Co. There was a carriage shed and an engine shed with a turntable at the station approaches.

From 1 October 1850, trains of the Liverpool, Crosby and Southport Railway (LC&SR), which was operated on their behalf by the L&YR, began to run into Exchange/Tithebarn Street station, so now there were three companies using the terminus. The LC&SR became part of the L&YR on 14 June 1855. In all there were about 28 arrivals and departures each working day.

On 13 August 1859, the L&YR absorbed the ELR, from which date the name of the station was Liverpool Exchange and from then it was worked as a single station of five platforms.

== Second station ==
By the 1870s, the five platform station was struggling to cope with demand, in 1877 for example, there were 105 working day arrivals and departures, it became urgent to expand the station capacity.

Initially the L&YR sought to replace the station at the same height above street level, the lines still had to clear the canal and local streets. An act of Parliament giving approval was granted in 1875 and due to the difficulties in acquiring land in such a built-up area the powers were renewed in 1879. The company at this point decided to hold a design competition for the new station which attracted forty three entrants, the winner of which, John West, was announced on 3 August 1881. Detailed specifications were drawn up and tenders invited in early 1882, at which point a plan was submitted to build a station at street level. In July 1882 the company chief engineer, Sturges Meek, was asked to prepare new drawings for the station, and he instructed the newly-appointed company architect, Henry Shelmerdine, to design it and to include a hotel.

At the same time, Liverpool Corporation was concerned about the poor road system in the area, the council, railway and canal company came together and agreed to fill in Clarke's Basin at the end of the canal, building a new basin and warehouse for the canal company, allowing the road system to be improved by extending Pall Mall over part of the infill with some of the remaining land sold to the L&YR to enable a lower level approach and an expanded, rebuilt, station. (Note: Clarke & Hewitt (1992) note "There were several good reasons for the Canal Company’s agreement: despite modernisation, many of their facilities were old-fashioned; their finances were always tight; and their household coal trade, much of which used the western side of the basin, was declining as railways opened small coal yards in the suburbs. The scheme would provide them with modern warehouses, equal to any the railways owned, while the land released would give them a regular source of income from rents or sales.")

New powers were obtained in 1882 and 1883 to build the station at street level and lower the approach lines, the approaches were improved by building of a new four-track loop line which avoided Great Howard Street goods station and the awkward bends on the approach to the original station resulting from the imposed conditions to avoid the Borough gaol which had since been demolished.

The new station was built in two halves, the first half accessed by the new loop line was opened on 12 December 1886 and the 1850 station closed and demolished to provide the space for the second half of the new station. Two platforms of which opened on 23 February 1888 and the remainder on 2 July 1888.

There were ten platform faces each about 200 yd (180 m) long, platform 1 was at the eastern (Pall Mall) side of the station and was slightly shorter than the others. The platforms were protected by four longitudinal glazed gabled roofs, initially there were all the same length, the ones over platforms 1 to 5, for the longer distance services, survived until closure but the roofs over platforms 6 to 10 were shortened after being damaged during World War II, the roof work was completed in 1954.

Trains were controlled from two signal boxes, box 'A' in the centre of the station approach lines and box 'B' in an elevated position above the carriage sidings adjacent to Pall Mall.

There were two turntables. One 50 ft (15 m) long between the approaches to platforms 3 and 4 where there was enough space as an access roadway off Pall Mall running between those platforms. The other served the western side of the station (the higher numbered platforms), it was used less after electric trains began operating as they did not require turning.

The front portion of the station looking out onto Tithebarn Street contained the hotel and railway offices, it was separated from the platforms by a carriage concourse, later a cab road, with its own glazed roof that had an entrance on Pall Mall.

Beyond the carriage concourse was a circulating area containing several booking offices (General, local, season tickets etc.), parcels offices (inbound and outbound) various waiting rooms and conveniences, refreshment rooms (first class tea room and third class refreshments), a telegraph office and the stationmaster's office.

There was a subway connecting the platforms about half-way down their length which meant that passengers connecting between services did not need to go through the ticket barriers twice to change trains.

In 1886, there were 216 trains in and out of the station daily rising to over 300 by 1928. In 1895, trains departed to a wide variety of destinations including Manchester Victoria, Southport (via Burscough Junction and via Waterloo), Ormskirk, Blackpool Talbot Road, Leeds Central, York, Newcastle, Bradford Exchange, Bacup, Edinburgh Princes Street, Glasgow Central, Bury Knowsley Street, Bury Bolton Street, Colne, Blackburn, Accrington (some of the services to Blackburn and Accrington involved a slip coach).

The Midland Railway (MR) started using the station on 1 August 1888 to provide services to Glasgow St Enoch and Edinburgh Waverley via Blackburn, Hellifield and Carlisle.

In 1960, loudspeakers were introduced; there were 46, in nine groups, with an announcing room over the left-luggage office and auxiliary microphones positioned in the inspector's office on platform 7. There were four speakers on the concourse, each in multiple units of six.

Preceding station	Disused railways	Following station
Sandhills	Lancashire and Yorkshire Railway	Terminus

== Station hotel ==
The L&YR opened the Exchange Hotel at the station on 13 August 1888. The eighty bedroom hotel shared the building on Tithebarn Street with the railway offices being to the right of the central pedestrian entrance and the hotel to the left with its own decorative iron entrance canopy stretched out over the pavement. (Note: Marshall (1970) states the hotel provided 150 rooms but most other sources quote eighty. Some diagrams of the station layout show the hotel above both sides of the building facing onto Tithebarn Street, see for example Christiansen (1995) whereas the OS mapping generally shows the hotel only over one side, see for example the map of 1908.)

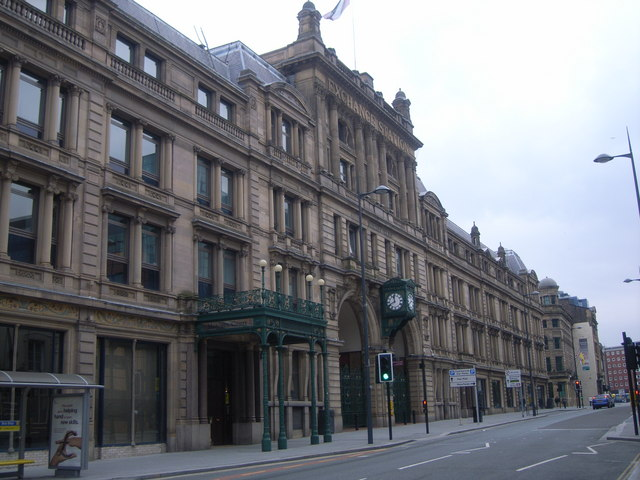
Exchange station and hotel frontage in 2008

The hotel was designed by Henry Shelmadine, the L&YR land agent and architect.

The hotel frontage was in free renaissance style with columns dividing the windows, an intricately decorated iron porte cochère and a matching projecting clock. John Pearson. a former chairman of the L&YR, mayor of Liverpool and High Sheriff of Lancashire is commemorated by a bust in bas-relief.

In addition to the bedrooms the hotel provided private sitting-rooms, a ballroom and hair-dressing rooms, it had its kitchens sited on the top floor which created problems keeping food cool during the summers.

The hotel name was changed to Exchange Station Hotel on 11 January 1892. (Note: Possibly to avoid a clash, the OS town plan surveyed in 1895 shows an Exchange Hotel on the corner of Tithebarn Street and Pall Mall, almost adjacent to the station.) The hotel's coffee room was extended in 1892 and a new banqueting hall was built.

Author and First World War poet Siegfried Sassoon frequently lodged in the hotel adjoining Exchange station. In 1917, after having earlier written at his London club his A Soldier's Declaration which appeared in the press and was read to the House of Commons, Sassoon was visited at the hotel by Colonel Jones Williams who reprimanded him for his actions. It was from Exchange station that Sassoon made his famous trip to Formby the next day, ripped the ribbon of his Military Cross off his tunic and flung it into the waters at the mouth of the Mersey.

In 1933, the London, Midland and Scottish Railway (LMS) improved the premises. Running hot and cold water and central heating was fitted to all rooms. Additional bathrooms were built, alterations were made to the front hall and lounge, with an extension of the dining-room. On top of this, a new smoke-room and lounge were built on the first floor and the hotel was completely redecorated.

In March 1971, it was announced that the Exchange Hotel (now rated as three-star) was to be closed. This occurred on 3 July and on 11 August the insides were stripped and auctioned. The hotel business being transferred to the Liverpool Adelphi.

== Electrification ==
The L&YR introduced multiple-unit third-rail electric powered trains from Exchange station to Hall Road, Southport Chapel Street and Crossens from March 1904, (Note: Initially it was a four-rail system, but the fourth, centre rail, was gradually removed and the running rails used to return the current.) with a full service from 13 May 1904. The trains used two platforms at Exchange, prior to electrification there were seventy-four trains a day, the maximum the platforms could manage, after electrification the number of services increased to one hundred and nineteen.

On 1 June 1906, the North Mersey Branch was electrified and services began to run from Exchange to Aintree and later that year on 19 November 1906 a direct electric service to Aintree via Kirkdale began. The electrification of this line was subsequently extended to Ormskirk in 1913.

Electric trains used platforms 6 to 10, with trains to Southport usually departing from platforms 9 and 10 though platform 8 would also be used when it was busy.

== World War II damage ==
Exchange station was blocked for over three months when three fallen arches and two bridge-piers blocked the lines as a result of the particularly devastating bombing raid of 20 December 1940.

Services out of the station were disrupted by enemy action and to assist the Cheshire Lines Committee ran special trains between Liverpool Central and Southport Lord Street to relieve some of the pressure, this service ran from 24 December 1940 to 5 July 1941.

During the night of 7–8 May 1941, the loop-line viaduct was damaged and impassable resulting in Wigan services terminating at Preston Road, and later at Kirkdale. Preston services terminated at Aintree and the electric services at Kirkdale with buses making the connection into the city centre. The station was completely out of use for three months and normal service did not resume until May 1942.

== Operations post-World War II ==
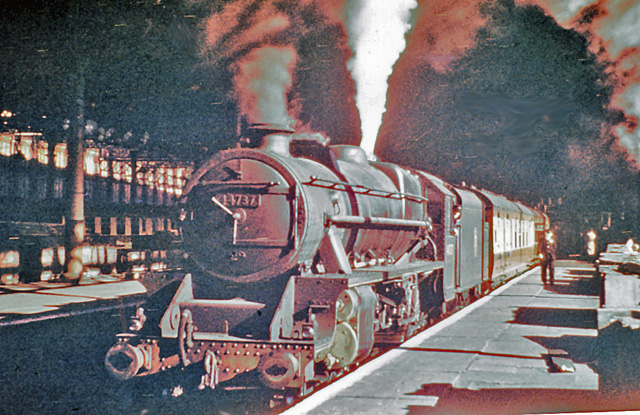
Liverpool Exchange Station in 1954

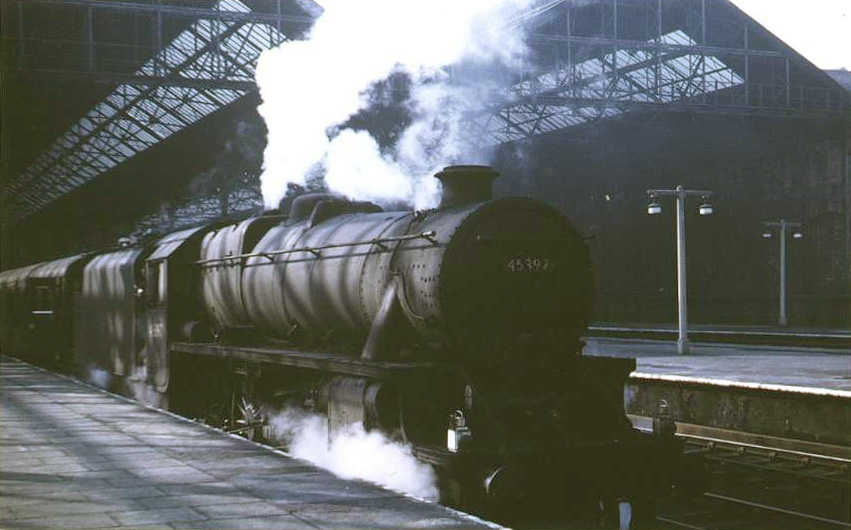
Liverpool Exchange's departures end on 4 May 1968 showing station structure and roof and the morning express to Glasgow Central about to leave for Preston

On 2 May 1944, the station staff were provided with Liverpool’s first rail canteen. After the war, Exchange Station was thought to have a long future ahead of it and a series of improvements followed, heralded by the alteration of the Exchange clock to show the right time. This impressive machine, above the Tithebarn Street entrance, had previously been five minutes fast.

In 1951, the decision was taken to renew the roof which had been damaged by a bomb during the war; it was completed in 1954.

== Closure ==
The withdrawal of the Aintree via North Mersey Branch services took place in 1951.

The early sixties saw the beginning of the decline of the station, fourteen cuts in services between Manchester Victoria, Wigan, Southport and Exchange took place in September 1958.

The programme of route closures in the early 1960s, known as the Beeching Axe, included the closure of Liverpool Exchange. The Beeching Report recommended that the mostly-electrified suburban and outer-suburban commuter rail services into Exchange and Central High Level stations from the north and south of the city be terminated. Long and medium-distance routes would be concentrated on one mainline terminal station at Lime Street station serving Liverpool, the Wirral and beyond.

Liverpool City Council took a different view, proposing the retention of the suburban services and integrating them into a regional electrified rapid-transit network by linking all lines via new tunnels under the centres of Liverpool and Birkenhead. This approach was supported by the Merseyside Area Land Use and Transportation Study (the MALTS report). Merseyrail was born when Liverpool City Council's proposal was adopted.

On 3 August 1968, the last British Rail scheduled passenger train to be hauled by a standard gauge steam locomotive ended its journey at Liverpool Exchange, Stanier 'Black 5' no. 45318 having hauled from Preston the Liverpool portion of the evening Glasgow to Liverpool and Manchester train.

Platforms 1 to 3 were closed in 1970 and the area used for car parking.

In 1973, platforms 8 to 10 at Exchange were closed and their site used for construction and access to the underground station being built by Merseyrail at Moorfields. Platforms 4 and 5 were provided with conductor rails to accommodate the trains that would have used the now closed platforms. There was only one remaining diesel service that went to Wigan Wallgate and Bolton.

To mark the final closure of Liverpool Exchange station on 29 April 1977, the London Midland Region of BR ran a special of Mk II coaches at 23.32 thence to Wigan and Liverpool Lime Street, where it was due at 01.11 on the next morning.

This ambitious scheme involved diverting the Ormskirk and Southport electric services under Exchange station and into a new tunnel running north to south under Liverpool's city centre, named the Link Tunnel, linking separate lines in the north and south of the city creating a north–south crossrail. Exchange station would be replaced by a station in the new tunnel named Moorfields.

Trains formerly serving Exchange station call at the new nearby Moorfields underground station then continue in the tunnel to terminate at Liverpool Central, or onwards to Hunts Cross in the extreme south of the city. At both Moorfields and Central stations easy interchange was possible for the first time with Wirral Line services, which until then had operated as a completely separate network.

Liverpool Exchange closed on Saturday 30 April 1977. The replacement Liverpool Moorfields station opened the following Monday, 2 May 1977.

After closure, in 1978, the old station was demolished by Oldham Bros, a local demolition company.

However, the frontage of the station building was preserved and incorporated into a new office building built behind, named 'Mercury Court' opening in 1986.

In 2013, after a £5 million redevelopment it was renamed Exchange Station.

== Reopening for high-speed rail ==
As of 2023, the planned route of HS2 has been scaled back. There had been calls by local architects to open Exchange station extending over Leeds Street to the north and onto the approach viaduct. The proposal had been to branch off the 1830 Liverpool-Manchester line at Broad Green and onto the North Liverpool Extension trackbed. The line runs to the north then curves to the south at Walton and Kirkdale. The old Exchange station site is in the heart of Liverpool's business quarter and not far from the cruise liner terminal and the Liverpool Waters development.

== Station masters ==
- John Ingham 1879 - 1897
- Thomas Wood ca. 1897 - 1902 (formerly assistant station master at Manchester Victoria)
- Frederick Shaw 1902 - 1921
- James Abram 1921 - 1930 (formerly station master at Blackburn)
- James Hale 1930 - 1932 (formerly station master at Blackburn)
- William Miller 1932 - 1938
- Sidney Richard Sayer 1938 - 1943 (formerly station master at Blackburn)
- Francis Joseph Boothroyd 1943 - 1956
- Robert W. Ward 1956 - 1961
- Matthew Edward Redhead 1961 - 1964 (formerly station master at Rugby)
- Walter Bishop 1964 - 1966 (afterwards station master at Bootle)
