= List of museums in Merseyside =

This list of museums in Merseyside, England contains museums which are defined for this context as institutions (including nonprofit organizations, government entities, and private businesses) that collect and care for objects of cultural, artistic, scientific, or historical interest and make their collections or related exhibits available for public viewing. Also included are non-profit art galleries and university art galleries. Museums that exist only in cyberspace (i.e., virtual museums) are not included.

== Museums ==
Name	Image	Town/City	Region	Type	Summary
20 Forthlin Road		Allerton	Liverpool	Historic house	Operated by the National Trust, childhood home of Paul McCartney, part of the Beatles' Childhood Homes tour
The Atkinson		Southport	Sefton	Multiple	Regional cultural centre for arts and cultural entertainment, includes art, local history, Egyptology and decorative art collections from the Botanic Gardens Museum and Bootle Free Library and Museum
The Beatles Story		Liverpool	Liverpool	Music	Exhibition and museum dedicated to the leading 1960s group The Beatles
Birkenhead Priory and St Mary's Tower		Birkenhead	Wirral	Religious	Remains and exhibits about the medieval priory
Bluecoat Chambers		Liverpool	Liverpool	Art	Arts centres with exhibit galleries
British Lawnmower Museum		Southport	Sefton	Agriculture	Vintage lawnmowers
Croxteth Hall		Liverpool	Liverpool	Historic house	16th century country house with Edwardian period rooms, Victorian period farm and walled garden
Fort Perch Rock		New Brighton	Wirral	Multiple	Exhibits include maritime displays, military aviation, and merchant marine radio and wireless
Foundation for Art and Creative Technology		Liverpool	Liverpool	Art	Arts centre for film, video and new and emerging media
Garstang Museum of Archaeology		Liverpool	Liverpool	Archaeology	website, part of the University of Liverpool, artifacts from Ancient Egypt, Sudan and the Levant
The Hardmans' House		Liverpool	Liverpool	Historic house	Operated by the National Trust, home of photographer E. Chambré Hardman, features portraits of the people of Liverpool, the city and the landscapes of the surrounding countryside
International Slavery Museum		Liverpool	Liverpool	History	History and legacy of transatlantic slavery and its contemporary relevance, located on the third floor of the building housing the Merseyside Maritime Museum
Lady Lever Art Gallery		Port Sunlight	Wirral	Art	Collection includes British 18th century and 19th century paintings, 18th century furniture and Wedgwood
Leasowe Lighthouse					
Liverpool Cathedral		Liverpool	Liverpool	Religious	Includes 3-D film and interactive displays about the cathedral's architecture, history and art, its people and purpose; historic artifacts, tours of the tower and a collection of Victorian and Edwardian ecclesiastical embroidery
Mendips		Liverpool	Liverpool	Historic house	Operated by the National Trust, 1950s period childhood house of singer/composer John Lennon of The Beatles, part of the Beatles' Childhood Homes tour
Merseyside Fire Service Heritage and Education Centre		Bootle	Sefton	Firefighting	website
Merseyside Maritime Museum		Liverpool	Liverpool	Maritime	Shipping, trade, local ties to the RMS Titanic, RMS Lusitania and RMS Empress of Ireland, Battle of the Atlantic, life at sea, Seized! The Border and Customs uncovered
Museum of Liverpool		Liverpool	Liverpool	Multiple	City's history, culture and social history, art, costumes, decorative art
North West Museum of Road Transport		St Helens	St Helens	Transportation	Vintage buses, also classic cars, trucks and fire engines
The Oratory		Liverpool	Liverpool	Art	19th century sculpture and funeral monuments of notable citizens, part of the Walker Art Gallery
Port Sunlight Museum & Garden Village		Port Sunlight	Wirral	History	website, history of the model village built in 1888 by William Lever, 1st Viscount Leverhulme
Prescot Museum		Prescot	Knowsley	Local	website, local history, culture, clock and watch making industry, pottery manufacture, cable making and mining
Smithy Heritage Centre		Eccleston	St Helens	Local	website, local history
Spaceport		Seacombe	Wirral	Science	Space and space travel
Speke Hall		Liverpool	Liverpool	Historic house	Operated by the National Trust, black and white wood-framed Tudor manor house with Victorian rooms
St. George's Hall		Liverpool	Liverpool	History	History and tours of the hall, its prison, refurbished criminal court and judge's robing room, gallery for local art and culture displays
Sudley House		Aigburth	Liverpool	Art	Victorian historic house museum with art gallery
Tate Hall Museum		Liverpool	Liverpool	Multiple	Part of the University of Liverpool, exhibit topics include zoology, medicine, dentistry, archaeology, engineering and oceanography
Tate Liverpool		Liverpool	Liverpool	Art	Modern and contemporary art
U-boat Story		Birkenhead	Wirral	Maritime	Recovered German World War II submarine and artifacts including an Enigma machine
Victoria Gallery & Museum		Liverpool	Liverpool	Art	Part of the University of Liverpool, paintings, sculptures and ceramics
Walker Art Gallery		Liverpool	Liverpool	Art	Collections include Italian and Netherlandish paintings from 1300 to 1550, European art from 1550 to 1900. 18th and 19th century British art, prints, drawings and watercolours, 20th century works and sculpture
Western Approaches - Liverpool War Museum		Liverpool	Liverpool	Military	Restored bunker of the major operational command of the Royal Navy during World War II
Williamson Art Gallery and Museum		Birkenhead	Wirral	Art	Collections include Victorian oil paintings, English watercolours, Liverpool porcelain and Della Robbia Pottery, ship models, local history
Williamson Tunnels Heritage Centre		Liverpool	Liverpool	History	Early 19th century network of tunnels and exhibits about their builder
Wirral Transport Museum		Birkenhead	Wirral	Transportation	Displays of buses, trams, cars, motorbikes and motor accessories, and a model railway layout
World Museum		Liverpool	Liverpool	Multiple	Archaeology, ethnology, natural history, geology and fossils, Ancient Egypt, space, science, coins
World of Glass (St Helens)		St Helens	St Helens	Art	website, exhibits of historic and contemporary glass art, glass-making industry and history, glassblowing

== Defunct museums ==
- Bootle Free Library and Museum, collections now part of The Atkinson
- Cavern Mecca, closed in 1984
- Botanic Gardens Museum, collections now part of The Atkinson
- HM Customs & Excise National Museum, Liverpool, collections now a gallery in the Merseyside Maritime Museum
- King's Regiment (Liverpool) Museum, Liverpool, formerly part of the Museum of Liverpool Life, closed in 2006, will reopen as a gallery in the Museum of Liverpool
- Liverpool Scottish Regimental Museum, Liverpool, artifacts now in storage
- Museum of Liverpool Life, Liverpool, closed in 2006, collections moved to the Museum of Liverpool
- National Conservation Centre, Liverpool, closed to the public in 2010
- Shore Road Pumping Station, Birkenhead
- Steamport Southport, Southport, also known as Southport Railway Museum, closed in 1999, collections now part of the Ribble Steam Railway
- Warship Preservation Trust, Birkenhead, closed in 2006
- Wirral Museum, Birkenhead

== See also ==
- Category:Tourist attractions in Merseyside
