= Freshfield =

Area of Formby, Merseyside, England

Coordinates: 53.5628°N 3.0702°W

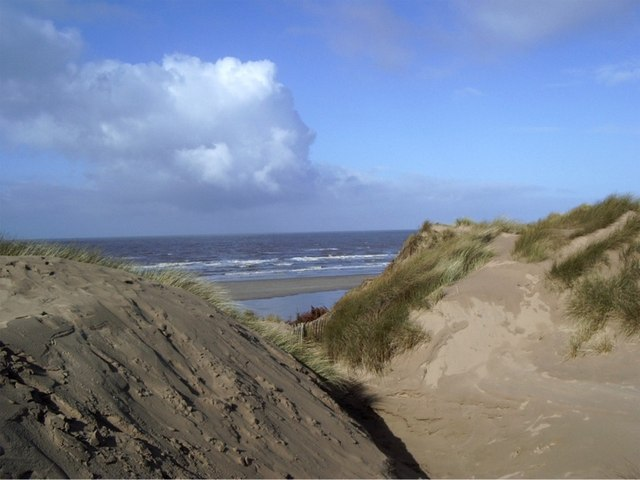
- Beach near Freshfield

- Location within Merseyside
- OS grid reference: SD292078
- Metropolitan borough: Sefton
- Metropolitan county: Merseyside
- Region: North West
- Country: England
- Sovereign state: United Kingdom
- Post town: LIVERPOOL
- Postcode district: L37
- Dialling code: 01704
- Police: Merseyside
- Fire: Merseyside
- Ambulance: North West
- UK Parliament: Sefton Central

Freshfield is an area of Formby, in the Metropolitan Borough of Sefton, Merseyside, England, situated at the northern end of the town. It has no local political distinction or representation and is included as part of the two council wards which make up Formby (Harington and Ravenmeols), nor is it any longer separated in a physical sense from the town.

The area is often considered to be affluent with local celebrities, footballers, politicians and businessmen making it their home (see people from Formby). Shireburn Road in Freshfield is the most expensive road in Merseyside, house prices on the exclusive road averaged £1,159,831 in 2009.

== History ==
The name did not exist until Formby's second railway station, Freshfield, was built in 1854. The name was chosen, as the local landowner, Thomas Fresh, owned the adjacent model farm and fields. Fresh was Inspector of Nuisances in Liverpool and was one of the celebrated trio of pioneering officers appointed in 1847 by the Borough of Liverpool's Health of the Town Committee; the others being William Henry Duncan, the UK's first medical officer of health, and James Newlands, borough engineer (though Fresh had been in a similar post for more than two years previously).

A process of reverse naming seems to have occurred with some people referring to the area of Formby around this station as "Freshfield". The title originally proposed was "Freshton".

== Governance ==
Until 1974, Freshfield was part of the urban district of Formby within the administrative county of Lancashire. Since 1 April 1974, it has formed part of the Metropolitan Borough of Sefton, in Merseyside.

From 1950 until 2010 Freshfield like the rest of Formby formed part of the constituency of Crosby, The MP for Crosby from 1997 until 2010 was Claire Curtis-Thomas, a member of the Labour Party, prior to her election the seat was generally considered to be a safe Conservative Party stronghold with Tory MPs elected at every election barring the 1981 Crosby by-election where Shirley Williams of the Social Democratic Party was elected to represent the constituency. As a result of the Crosby constituency being abolished for the 2010 general election, Freshfield like the rest of Formby is part of the newly created Sefton Central constituency represented by Bill Esterson, a member of the Labour Party.

For elections to Sefton Council, Freshfield is divided between two electoral wards with three councillors each: Harington ward, whose councillors are Peter Harvey (Labour), Carol Richards (Labour) and Joe Riley (Conservative); and Ravenmeols ward, whose councillors are Catie Page (Labour), Christopher Page (Labour) and Nina Killen (Labour).

== Community ==
The area contains The Freshfield and The Grapes pubs, Victoria Hall and Victoria Road (a long avenue on which several famous English sportsmen have lived). RAF Woodvale is nearby.

== Transport ==
Freshfield railway station is situated on the Liverpool to Southport branch of Merseyrail's Northern Line.

== Formby Woods ==
Located nearby is a section of the Mersey Forest, known as Formby Woods, a community forest known for being a habitat of rare red squirrels, with a reserve managed by the National Trust.
