= William Mackenzie (contractor) =

British civil engineer (1794–1851)

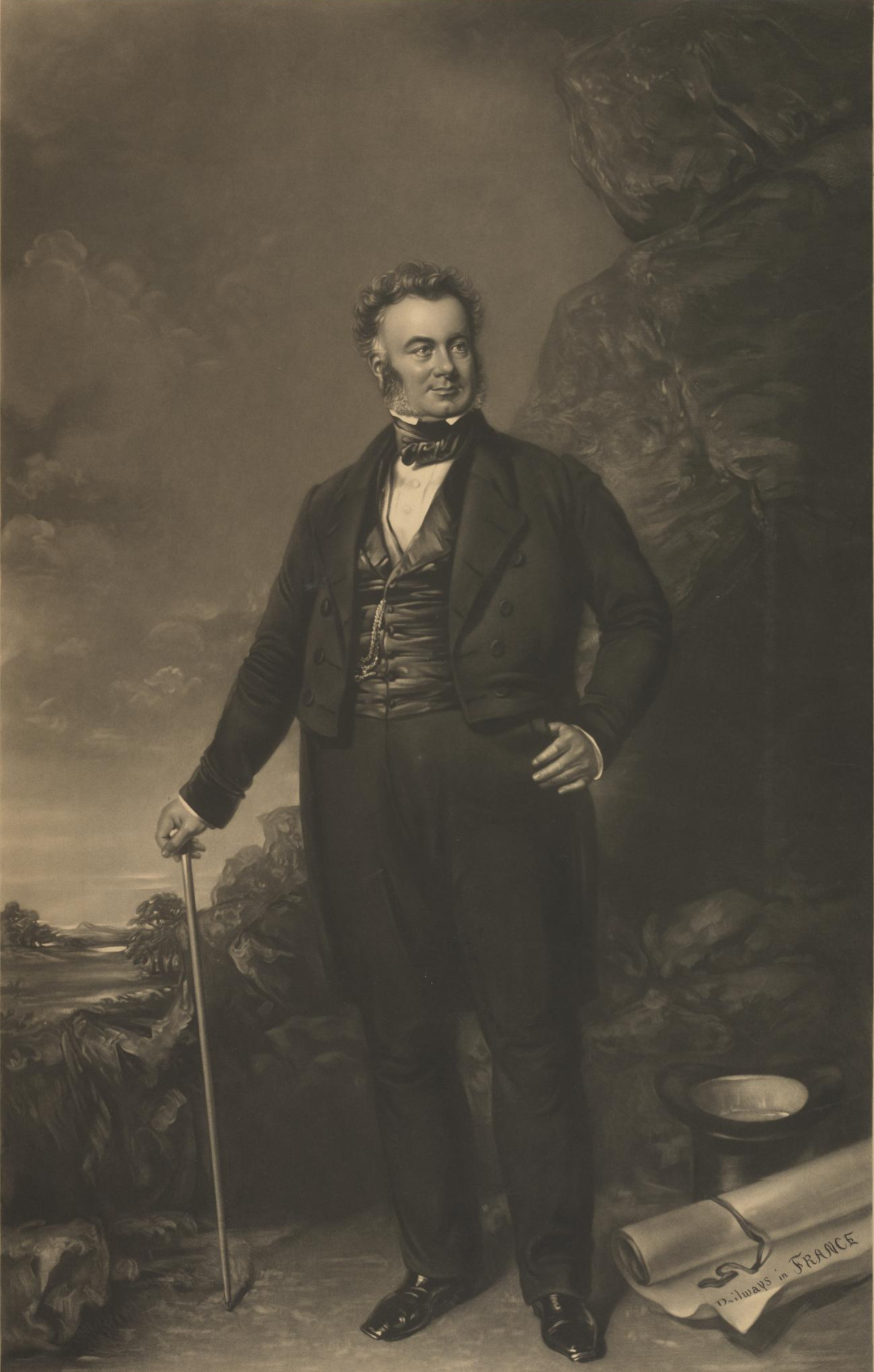
- Engraving copy of a portrait of William Mackenzie by Thomas Henry Illidge
- Born: 20 March 1794; Nelson, Lancashire, England
- Died: 29 October 1851 (aged 57); 74 Grove Street, Liverpool, England
- Resting place: St Andrew's Church, Rodney Street, Liverpool
- Occupations: Civil engineer, Contractor
- Known for: Civil engineering contractor
- Spouse(s): Mary Dalziel; Sarah Dewhurst
- Parent(s): Alexander Mackenzie; Mary Roberts

William Mackenzie (20 March 1794 – 29 October 1851) was an Anglo-Scottish civil engineer and civil engineering contractor who was one of the leading European contractors in the 1840s.

== Early life ==
Mackenzie was born near Nelson, Lancashire, England, the eldest of the 11 children of Alexander Mackenzie, a Scottish contractor, and Mary née Roberts. He started his career as an apprentice weaver but changed to civil engineering, becoming a pupil of a lock carpenter on the Leeds and Liverpool Canal in 1811. He continued his training on a dry dock at Troon harbour, on Craigellachie Bridge and as an agent on the Edinburgh and Glasgow Union Canal.

== Career ==
In 1822 he became an agent for the completion of the Gloucester and Berkeley Canal. Soon after this he was appointed resident engineer for Thomas Telford's Mythe Bridge at Tewkesbury, then resident engineer to the improvements to the Birmingham canals, again under Telford. Following this he returned to contracting, his profitable contracts including tunnels on the Liverpool and Manchester Railway between Edge Hill and Lime Street, and contracts for the Grand Union, North Union, Midland Counties and Glasgow, Paisley and Greenock railways. Non-railway contracts included Liverpool Haymarket, the Manchester and Sheffield Junction Canal and the Shannon navigation.

In 1840 Mackenzie was invited by Joseph Locke to tender for works on the Paris to Rouen railway. He tendered jointly with Thomas Brassey and together they were granted the contract. When this was complete he built more railways in France, Spain, the Italian states and Belgium. Also in partnership with Brassey he built further railways in France, England, Wales and Scotland. Mackenzie also made investments, which included ironworks in Wales and France, housing in Liverpool and estates in Scotland.

== Personal life ==
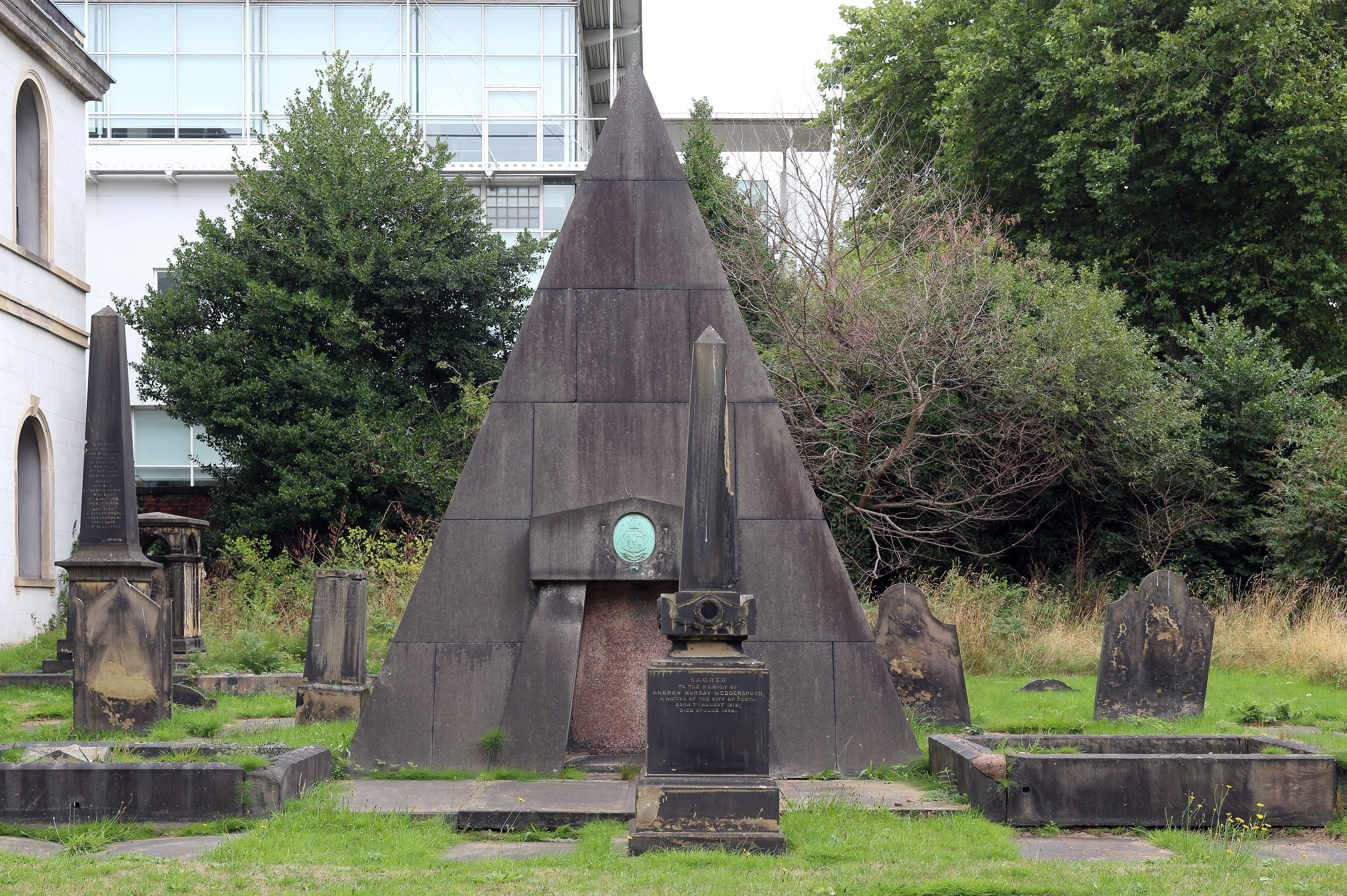
Mackenzie's pyramidal tomb

In 1819 Mackenzie married Mary Dalziel, daughter of a Glasgow commission agent. Mary died before him on 19 December 1838, aged 48. In 1839 he married Sarah Dewhurst, who died after him on 9 December 1867, aged 60. Mackenzie maintained offices in Paris and in Liverpool and from 1843 he lived at 74 Grove Street, Liverpool, where he died on 29 October 1851, aged 57.

He was buried in St Andrew's Church, Rodney Street, Liverpool in 1851. A pyramid-shaped monument was erected at the grave by his brother Edward in 1868. An inscription on the pyramid door reads: "In the vault beneath lie the remains of William Mackenzie of Newbie, Dumfriesshire, Esquire who died 29th October 1851 aged 57 years. Also, Mary his wife, who died 19th December 1838 aged 48 years and Sarah, his second wife who died 9th December 1867 aged 60 years. This monument was erected by his Brother Edward as a token of love and affection A.D. 1868. The memory of the just is blessed".

William's estate amounted to £341,848 in 1851 (equivalent to £42 million in 2021), almost all of which was left to his youngest brother, Edward. He had no children.The Diary of William Mackenzie, published by Thomas Telford Publishing in 2000, is a full transcription of Mackenzie's handwritten diaries, and it provides insight into his busy life.

== See also ==
- Canals of the United Kingdom
- History of the British canal system
