= Rodney Street, Liverpool =

Street in Liverpool, UK

Rodney Street
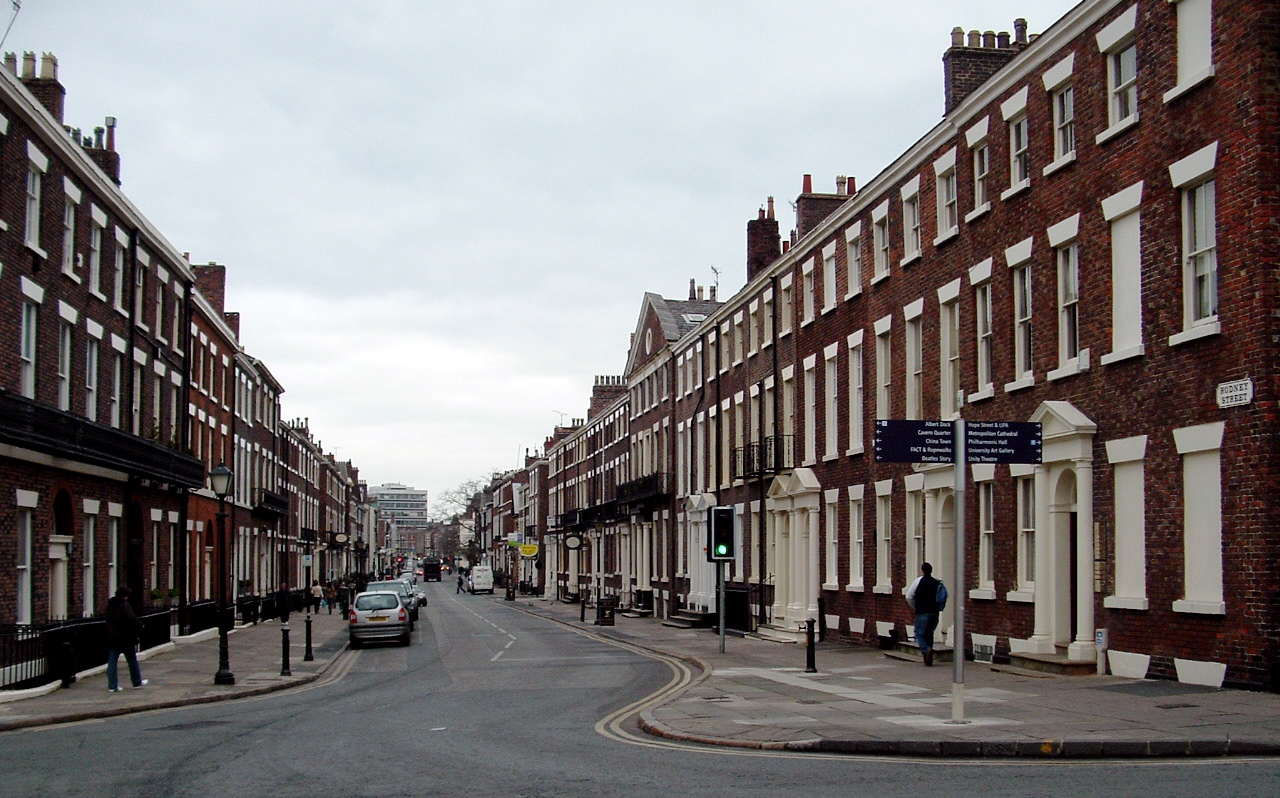
- Rodney Street at its junction with Upper Duke Street
- Location: Canning, Liverpool city centre
- Coordinates: 53.4018°N 2.9733°W

Construction
- Construction start: 1783
- Completion: 1784

Rodney Street in Liverpool, England, is noted for the number of doctors who practise there and its Georgian architecture. It is sometimes referred to as the "Harley Street of the North". Together with Hope Street and Gambier Terrace it forms the Rodney Street conservation area. There are over 60 Grade II listed buildings on the street and one Grade II* former church. (Note: In the context of the UK listing system, structures such as monuments and lamp-posts can be individually designated as if they were a building in the more common sense of the word.)

== History ==
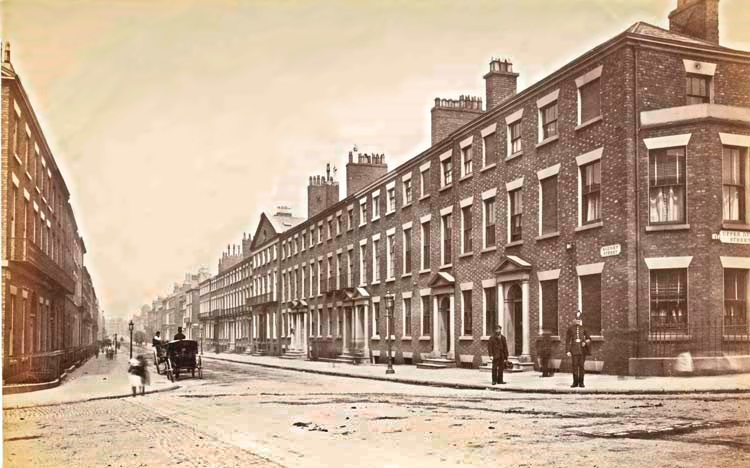
Rodney Street, Liverpool circa 1885

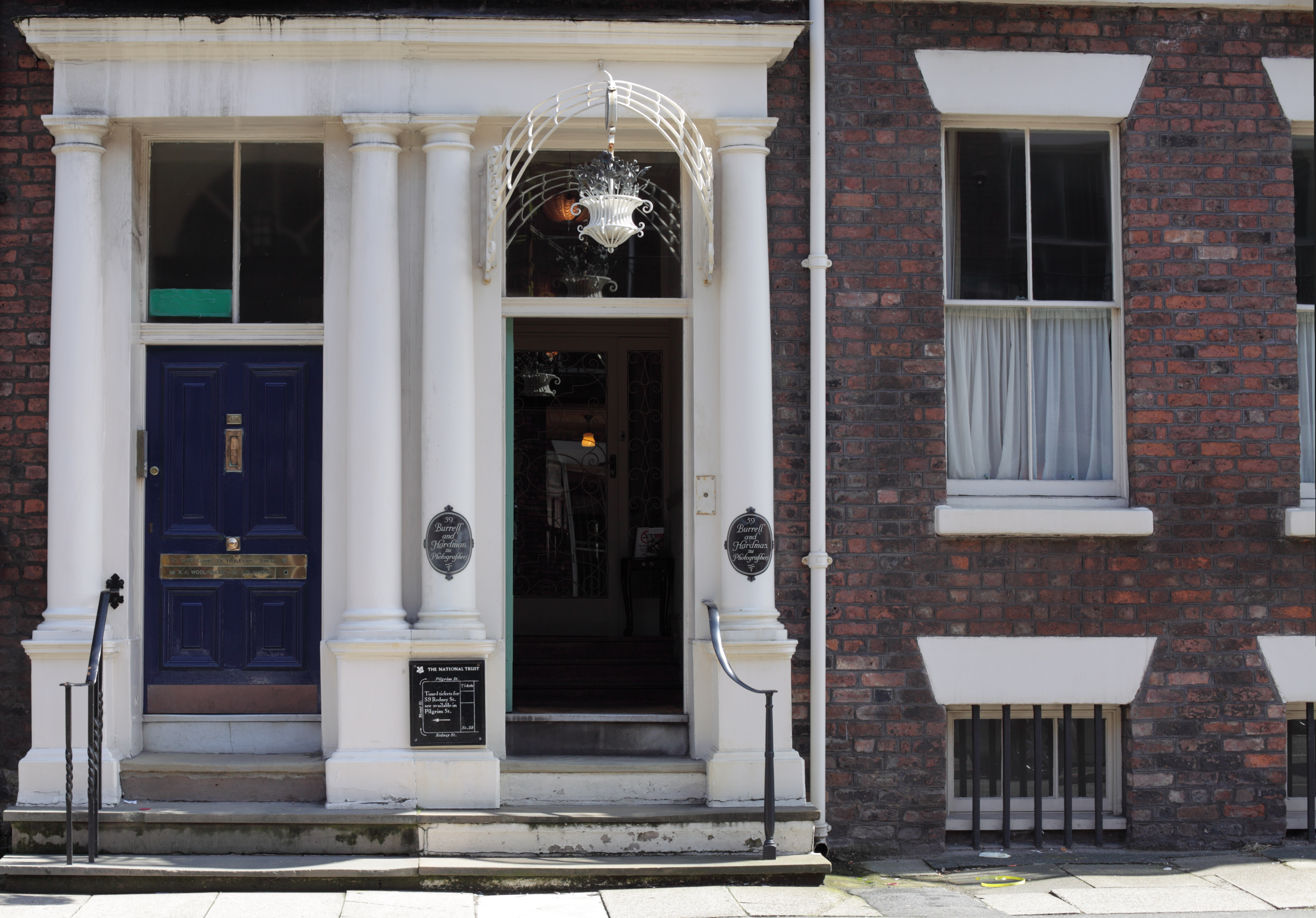
E. Chambré Hardman's studio at 59 Rodney Street

Rodney Street was laid out in 1783–1784 by William Roscoe and others. It was named after George Brydges Rodney, 1st Baron Rodney, who, in 1782, secured a naval victory over the Comte de Grasse at the Battle of the Saintes. It was developed piecemeal up to the 1820s with houses for the affluent, escaping the old town centre. A few houses have five bays, with central doors, but most are three bays. They were erected in pairs or short runs by different developers which led to an inconsistent roof line.

Sometimes referred to in local media as the "Harley Street of the North", some buildings on Rodney Street are now used by doctors conducting private clinics, notably for cosmetic surgery.

=== Buildings ===
No. 9 was the birthplace of Arthur Clough, a poet born in 1819. No. 62 (built 1792–1793) was the birthplace in 1809 of William Ewart Gladstone, Prime Minister of the United Kingdom on four separate occasions through the 1860s to the 1890s, and the home of his father John. No. 59 Rodney Street was home and studio to photographer Edward Chambré Hardman from 1947 to 1988, and his wife, business partner and fellow photographer, Margaret Hardman until her death in 1969, and is now owned by the National Trust and open to the public. On the north side of Rodney Street stands the disused Scottish Presbyterian Church of Saint Andrew, built in 1823–1824. The body of the church is of a simple two-storey design with round arched windows and stuccoed walls designed by Daniel Stewart. The façade of blackened ashlar, designed by John Foster Jr., is an imposing composition of Ionic entrance columns, flanked by corner towers, topped with Corinthian columns and domes. In 2012 the former church was renovated and redeveloped to provide en suite student accommodation for 100 students.

== Notable residents ==
- Henry Booth (1788–1869), merchant, entrepreneur, and engineer
- Arthur Hugh Clough (1819–1861) and Anne Clough (1820–1892), were born on the street
- James Gregson, slave trader and son of William Gregson (1721–1800)
- William Henry Duncan (1805–1863), appointed as Liverpool's first Medical Officer of Health in 1847
- William Ewart Gladstone (1809–1898), was born at No. 62 Rodney Street
- E. Chambré Hardman (1898–1988), photographer, studio at No. 59 Rodney Street
- Nicholas Monsarrat (1910–1979), novelist, was born on the street
- William Roscoe (1753–1831), developer and historian
- James Maury (1746–1840), the first United States consul from 1790 to 1829, lived at No. 4 Rodney Street
- Brian Epstein (1934–1967), manager of The Beatles, was born at No. 4 Rodney Street in 1934

== See also ==
- Architecture of Liverpool
- Grade II listed buildings in Liverpool-L1
- Grade II* listed buildings in Liverpool – City Centre
