= Thomas Fresh =

English public health officer

Thomas Fresh (3 September 1803 – 3 April 1861) was a pioneer in British environmental health. In 1844, he became Liverpool's first public health officer.

== Life and career ==
Thomas Fresh was born on 3 September 1803 at the family farm 'Newbarns', in the village of Newbarns, in the Lake District parish of Dalton-in-Furness. The family also had interests in property and iron-ore mining and trading.

Fresh was appointed Liverpool's Inspector of Nuisances by the Borough's Health of the Town Committee on 4 September 1844, over two years before the celebrated appointments on 1 January 1847 of William Henry Duncan, as Britain's first Medical Officer of Health, James Newlands as the first Borough Engineer, and Fresh's own re-appointment under the Liverpool Sanatory Act 1846 (9 & 10 Vict. c. cxxvii).

Even before his 1844 appointment, Fresh was the officer responsible for environmental health interventions, working initially from the police department. He was also at various times concurrently Superintendent of Alms Houses, and Superintendent of Scavengers (i.e. manager of refuse collection and public cleansing). The latter was eventually subsumed into Newlands' department.

Thomas Fresh was the first inspector of nuisances appointed by a United Kingdom Health Committee. When he was re-appointed in January 1847 he became probably the first of the inspectors of nuisances (sanitary inspectors) appointed under the Liverpool Sanatory Act 1846 with statutorily defined powers and duties. They were the forefathers of today's environmental health practitioners. With no trained staff to call upon, and with no established systems or infrastructures, Fresh created a model sanitary department, and became nationally famous. He worked closely with William Duncan, the Medical Officer of Health, who had no field staff of his own.

Fresh died in Glasgow on 3 April 1861 and is buried in Liverpool's St James's Cemetery. He was succeeded by his wife Martha. They had no children.

== Legacy ==
In 1853 Thomas and Martha Fresh were living in a much extended and improved former agricultural cottage on his 'model farm' in the Formby district between Liverpool and Southport when, on behalf of local residents and the joint Lord of the Manor, he asked the directors of the Liverpool, Crosby and Southport Railway to construct a station at that point on the line. He donated his own land for the purpose. As a significant landowner in the area, he gave his name to the district of Freshfield and Freshfield railway station – built in 1854.

Fresh's house is today 95 Freshfield Road, Freshfield. A blue plaque has been affixed to the house by the Formby Civic Society, and an application is to be made to have the house 'listed' to celebrate its significance as the home of the founder of Freshfield and one of the Liverpool public health pioneers. A nearby public house is called 'The Freshfield'. Fresh's official duties included solving the problem of the disposal of Liverpool's "night-soil". He arranged for a part of it to be transported from Liverpool to Freshfield for use as fertiliser on hitherto unproductive nearby fields, helping to develop a local trade in potato and asparagus cultivation. Freshfield is now an affluent residential district in the Borough of Sefton.

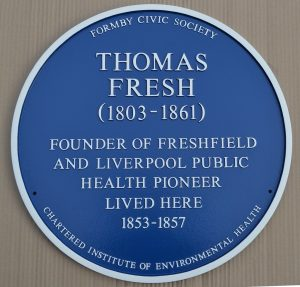
The blue plaque on Fresh's Freshfield house

Liverpool John Moores University organises an annual 'Thomas Fresh' public health lecture in his name.
