= The Camera (Irish magazine) =

Irish photography periodical (1921–1940)

The Camera was a monthly magazine, for long being Ireland's only photography journal, which was printed and published in Dublin between 1921 and 1940.

== Audience ==
The magazine The Camera, published from 2 Crow Street Dublin, was aimed at amateur photographers throughout Britain and Ireland, and increasingly at numbers of those who made their own movies. Unlike other photographic magazines it gave little space to technique and hardware, preferring articles on aesthetics and photographic styles, including Pictorialism and Modernism, in a critical, engaged manner when most Irish amateurs appear to have rejected modernism. During the 1920s advertisements in The Camera marketed new photographic technologies to women, represented photography as a key part of family life and identity and also featured articles by ‘Focal Plane Jane’, who gave advice to women photographers.

== Scope and influence ==
Until his death on June 29, 1929, its founding editor and publisher was journalist William Harding, a Dublin-based publisher and entrepreneur who also created the Dublin Camera Club (an offshoot of a much older group the Photographic Society of Ireland), and the Irish photography Salon in Westmoreland Street. In 1923 in the decade after independence, Harding, in an editorial advocating for photography in Ireland as a means of national identity, wrote: ‘In Scotland there are some seventy camera clubs, and in England between three and four hundred. Ireland’s camera clubs can be counted on the fingers of one hand. The facts speak for themselves.’ He had an eye on the international scene both in Europe and in America where the editors of Camera: A Practical Magazine for Photographers wrote of him that he was “an enterprising editor…enthusiastic for the cause above his contemporaries...”, though the British Journal of Photography showed less glowing enthusiasm for the Irishman. Through a British Royal Photographic Society meeting in 1925 he agitated for a 'federation' of photographers from all fields whether amateur or professional and of manufacturers and distributors of photographic supplies, to give voice to their numbers. In the January 30, 1925 issue of the British Journal of Photography, it was announced that his proposal was taken up.

== Reputation ==
The Camera established its reputation early and was acknowledged in 1925 by the U.S. publication Camera Craft to be "one of the foremost photographic magazines published in the United Kingdom." It reproduced the work of beginners and of advanced artists exhibited at the Irish and international salons. Photographic portfolios of Pictorialist photographers, such as Emil Otto Hoppé and Dublin-born E. Chambré Hardman, were regularly featured.
