= Blue Angel (nightclub) =

Nightclub in Liverpool, England

Coordinates: 53.401°N 2.976°W

The Blue Angel
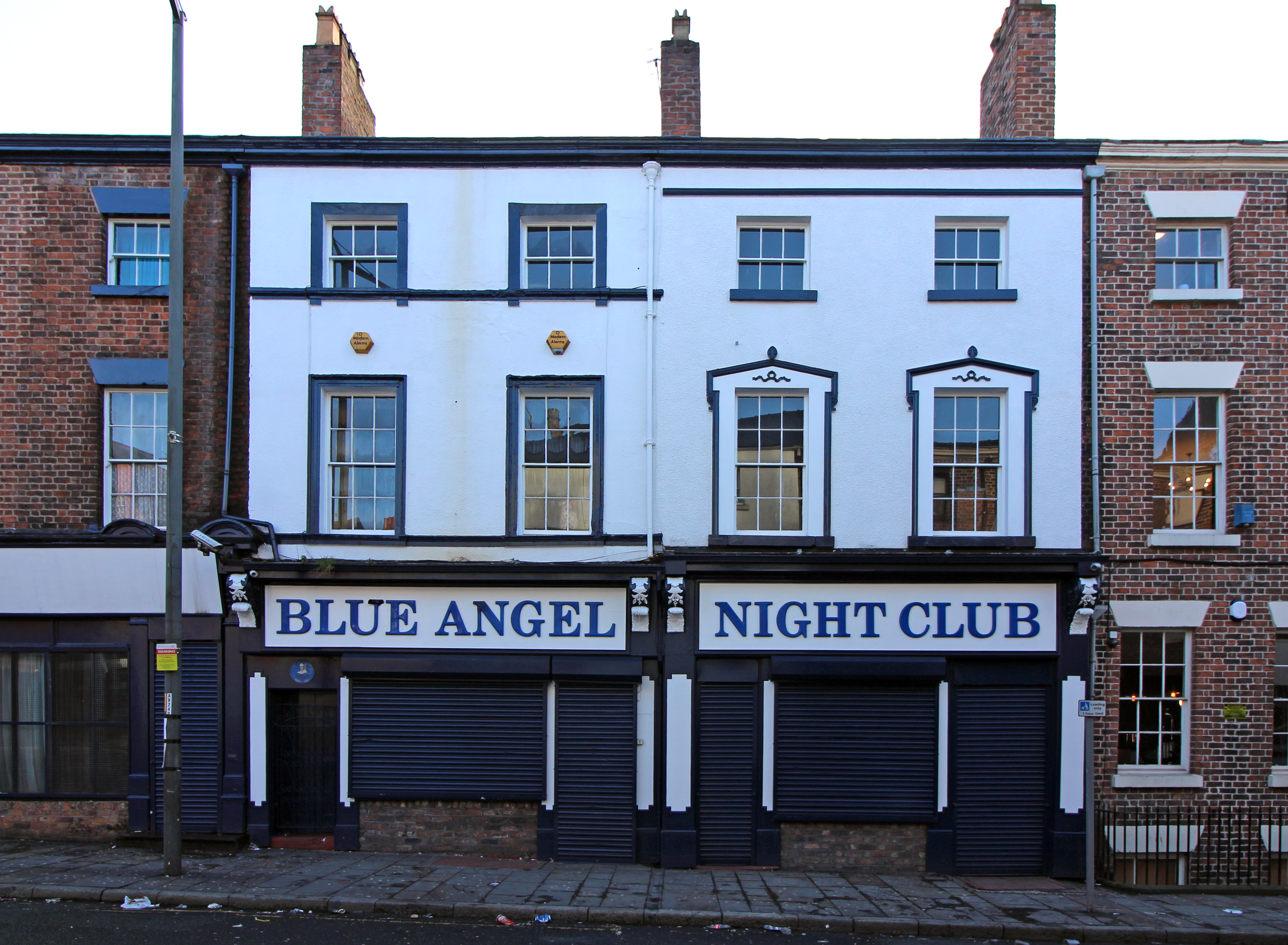
- The Blue Angel in 2018
- Interactive map of The Blue Angel
- Location: 106–108 Seel Street, Liverpool
- Type: Nightclub, music venue
- Event: Pop
- Public transit: Lime Street; Liverpool Central; Seel Street

Construction
- Opened: 1939

The Blue Angel, also known as "The Raz", is a nightclub in Liverpool, England. It is located where Seel Street meets Berry Street in Liverpool city centre. It is a venue in Liverpool in which the Beatles, the Rolling Stones, Bob Dylan and many other bands played at in the 1960s. It was historically a jazz club, but it now plays pop music.

== History ==
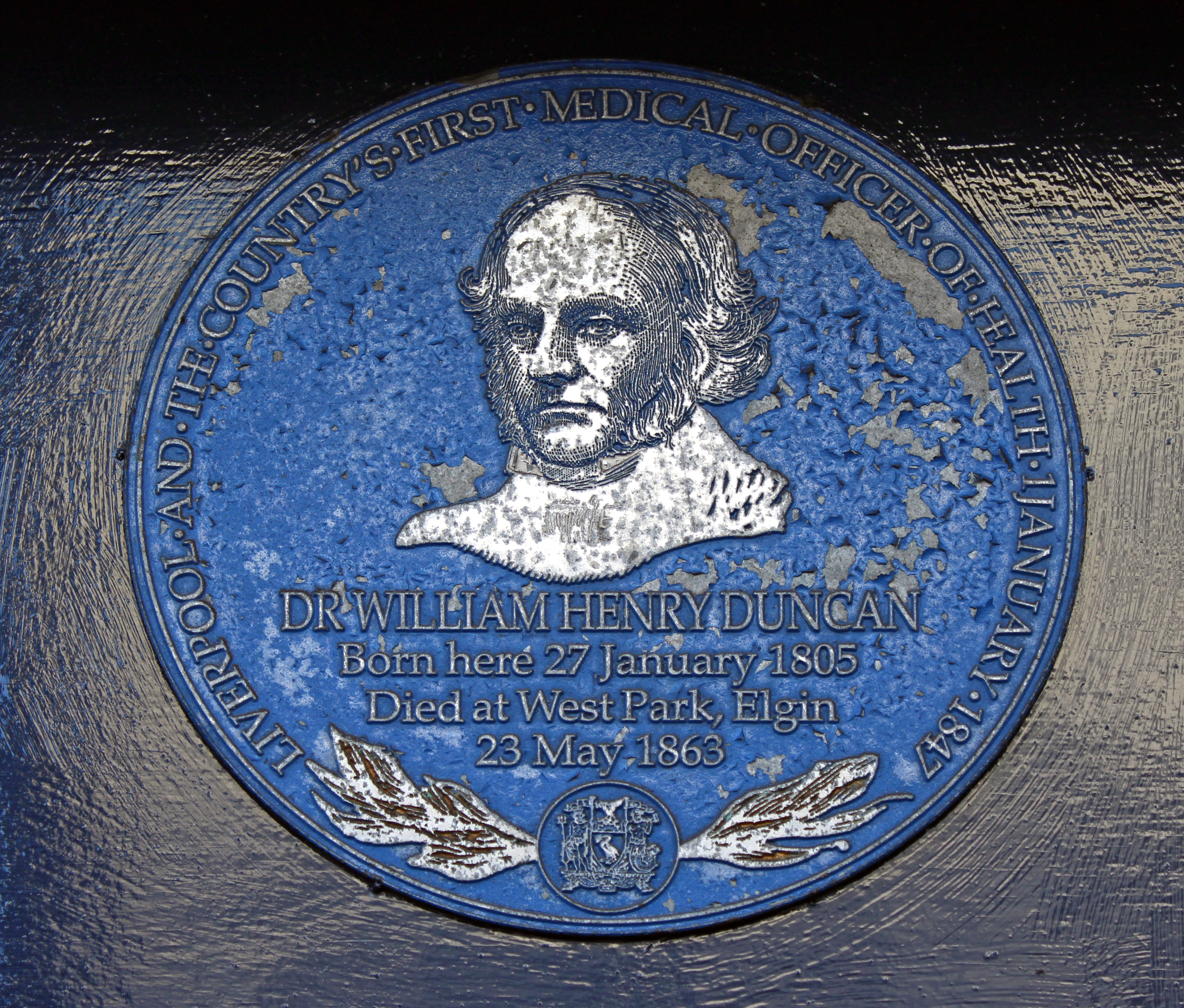
The William Duncan plaque

The building in which the club is situated was the birthplace in 1805 of Dr William Henry Duncan and a plaque above the door commemorates this. The Beatles' original manager Allan Williams was once the owner of the club and reputedly ejected Judy Garland after the local premiere of their first film, A Hard Day's Night, in 1964.

Pete Best's audition to join the Beatles took place in the Blue Angel on 12 August 1960. It was also where the Beatles, in 1960, auditioned for impresario Larry Parnes, landing them their first tour outside Liverpool, supporting singer Johnny Gentle on a tour of Scotland.

After seeing Cilla Black performing "Bye Bye Blackbird" at the Blue Angel, Brian Epstein contracted her as his only female client on 6 September 1963.

In the 1980s, the Blue Angel briefly changed its name to the Razzamataz, giving rise to its current nickname, before reverting back to its original name due to a request from the Beatles City museum asking the club if they could change their name back to the Blue Angel to attract tourists.

The Blue Angel's current owners are Valerie Davies and Michael Kearon.

== The Blue Angel today ==
The Blue Angel is especially popular with students; however the club attracts people from a wide range of ages and backgrounds, with people who attended the club in the 1990s still regularly visiting to this day. Monday nights are seen as one of the most popular nights for students to visit, and this coupled with the club holding an extended late night opening license means it is a draw with students. The club has two main floors and an outside seating area. The lower floor has DJ equipment and a dance floor, whilst the upper floor has more seating and a more bar-orientated feel. One popular drink available at the club is a 'Fat Frog' made by mixing a Smirnoff Ice, a blue WKD and an orange Bacardi Breezer.

In 2008, DJ equipment was seized from the club, following a series of complaints from local residents about noise levels, since the clientele had to smoke outside the club following the introduction of the smoking ban. The Blue Angel was banned from using its backyard.

A support network, set up mainly by students and boasting a website, was created in order to "Save the Raz" from closure.

In 2010 the Blue Angel won a court battle to remain open and operate as normal.
