= Freshfield railway station =

Railway station located on the Northern Line in Formby, Merseyside, England

Freshfield
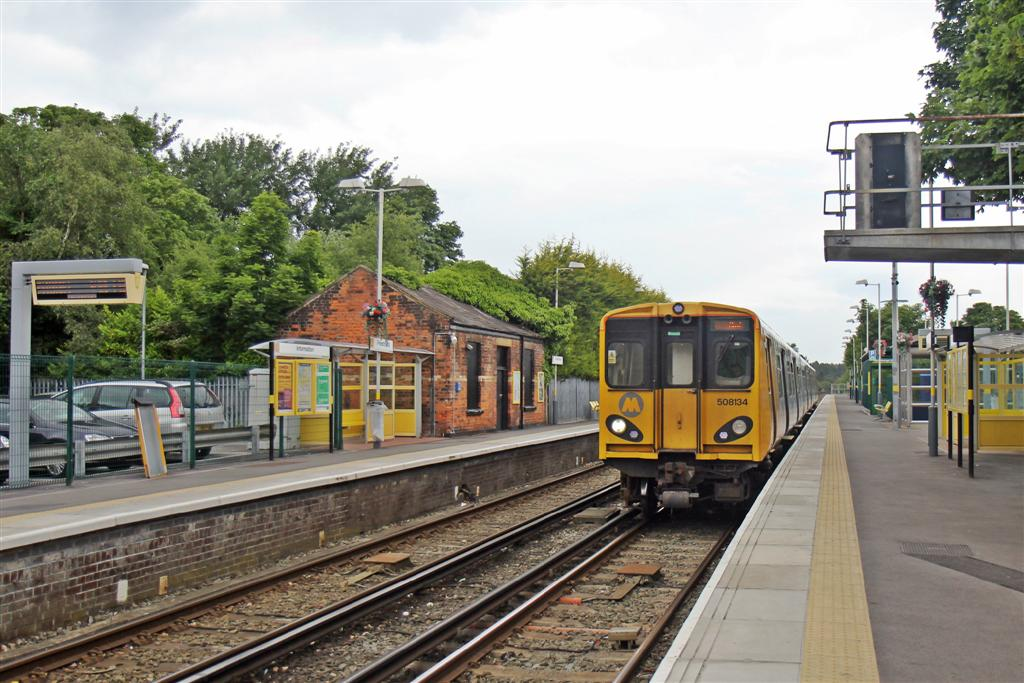

General information
- Location: Freshfield, Sefton; England
- Coordinates: 53.5660°N 3.0719°W
- Grid reference: SD291082
- Manager: Merseyrail
- Transit authority: Merseytravel
- Platforms: 2

Other information
- Station code: FRE
- Fare zone: D2
- Classification: DfT category E

History
- Original company: Liverpool, Crosby and Southport Railway
- Pre-grouping: Lancashire and Yorkshire Railway
- Post-grouping: London, Midland and Scottish Railway

Key dates
- By April 1854: Opened
- 29 July 1968: Closed to goods

Passengers
- 2021/22: ▲0.484 million
- 2022/23: ▲0.499 million
- 2023/24: ▲0.526 million
- 2024/25: ▲0.589 million
- 2025/26: ▲0.734 million
Location
Notes
- Passenger statistics from the Office of Rail and Road

Freshfield railway station serves the Freshfield district of Formby, Merseyside, England. The station is located on the Southport branch of the Merseyrail network's Northern Line.

== History ==
The line was built through the station site when the Liverpool, Crosby and Southport Railway (LC&SR) opened its line from Waterloo to Southport Eastbank Street. The line was subsequently extended to Liverpool Exchange in 1850 and Southport Chapel Street in 1851. This station opened sometime before April 1854 when it first appeared in the timetables.

The station was built at the instigation of Thomas Fresh, the first ‘Inspector of Nuisances’ in Liverpool, the station was named after him and in turn gave its name to the area around it. Next to the station was a manure siding, Fresh offered his own land for the purpose, where night-soil from Liverpool was brought for the use of local farmers who found it very beneficial in fertilising our light, sandy soils, so enabling the development of asparagus cultivation here in the mid-nineteenth century.

The station was situated on the north side of Victoria Road which was crossed using a level crossing.

The station had two platforms, one each side of the double-track, and was of timber construction. There was a signal box on the down side at the southern end of the station which managed the level crossing. (Note: Down trains usually away from the major conurbation, usually London, some railway companies ran 'up' to their headquarters location. In this case 'down' was towards Southport.)

In 1850 the LC&SR had been authorised to lease, sell or transfer itself to the L&YR and on 14 June 1855 the L&YR purchased and took over the LC&SR.

The station was improved sometime between 1894 and 1927, a footbridge was provided adjacent to Victoria Road and a station building with a booking office, waiting room and glazed canopy erected on the down, coastal, side.

By 1904 a small goods yard had opened to the north of Victoria Road, on the coastal side of the line.

The Lancashire and Yorkshire Railway amalgamated with the London and North Western Railway on 1 January 1922 and in turn was Grouped into the London, Midland and Scottish Railway in 1923. Nationalisation followed in 1948.

The goods yard closed on 29 July 1968.

In 1978 the station became part of the Merseyrail network's Northern Line (operated by British Rail until privatised in 1995).

== Facilities ==
The station is staffed, 15 minutes before the first train and 15 minutes after the last train, and has platform CCTV. There is a payphone, shelters, booking office and live departure and arrival screens, for passenger information. The station has a free car park, with 82 spaces, as well as a 10-space cycle rack and secure indoor storage for 44 cycles. Although both platforms are linked by a footbridge, wheelchair users can access both platforms via the level crossing.

== Services ==
Trains operate every 15 minutes throughout the day from Monday to Saturday to Southport to the north, and to Liverpool Central to the south. Sunday services are every 30 minutes in each direction.

Preceding station	National Rail	Following station
Ainsdale towards Southport	Merseyrail; Southport branch Northern Line	Formby towards Liverpool Central
	Historical railways	
Ainsdale towards Southport	Lancashire and Yorkshire Railway; Liverpool, Crosby and Southport Railway	Formby towards Liverpool Exchange
