= Ainsdale railway station =

Railway station in Merseyside, England

Ainsdale
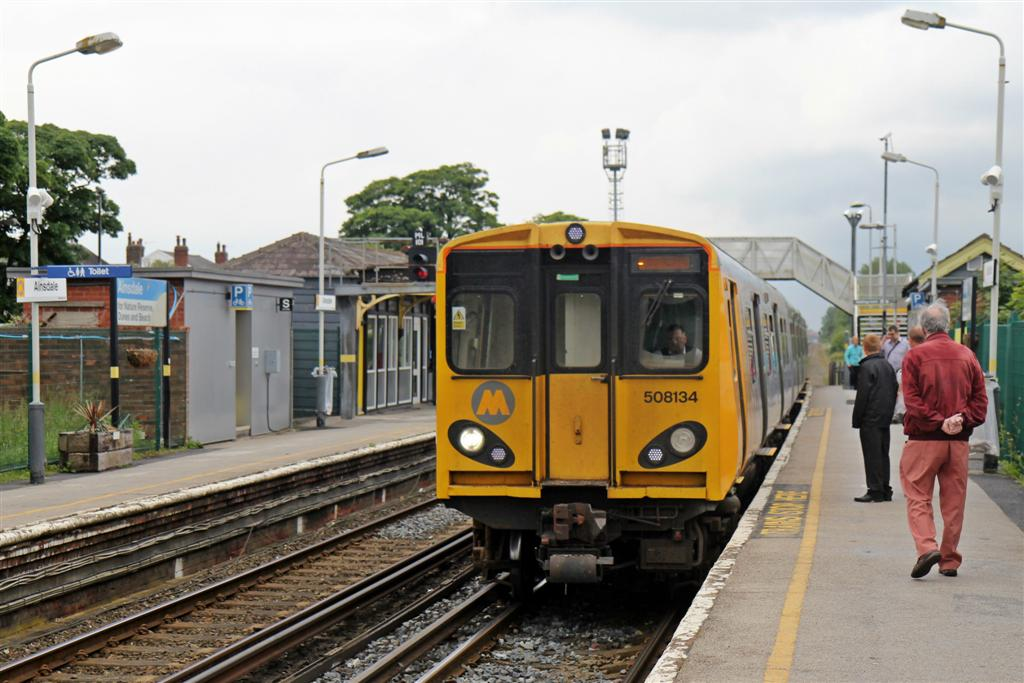

General information
- Location: Ainsdale, Sefton; England
- Coordinates: 53.6019°N 3.0428°W
- Grid reference: SD311122
- Manager: Merseyrail
- Transit authority: Merseytravel
- Platforms: 2

Other information
- Station code: ANS
- Fare zone: D1
- Classification: DfT category E

History
- Opened: 24 July 1848
- Original company: Liverpool, Crosby and Southport Railway
- Pre-grouping: Lancashire and Yorkshire Railway
- Post-grouping: London, Midland and Scottish Railway

Passengers
- 2021/22: ▲0.768 million
- 2022/23: ▲0.921 million
- 2023/24: ▲0.948 million
- 2024/25: ▼0.892 million
- 2025/26: ▲1.127 million
Location
Notes
- Passenger statistics from the Office of Rail and Road

Ainsdale railway station serves the village of Ainsdale near Southport, England. The station is located on the Southport branch of the Merseyrail network's Northern Line.

== History ==
Ainsdale railway station opened on 24 July 1848 when the Liverpool, Crosby and Southport Railway (LC&SR) opened its line from Waterloo to Southport Eastbank Street.

In 1851 a branch line was opened, without parliamentary authorisation, from the station to Ainsdale Corn Mill 53 ch (3,500 ft; 1,100 m) away on the east side of Liverpool Road. The legal status of the branch was regularised with a retrospective act of Parliament, the Liverpool, Crosby and Southport Railway Amendment Act 1853 (16 & 17 Vict. c. ccxi). (Note: Railways in the United Kingdom are, for historical reasons, measured in miles and chains. A chain is 22 yards (20 m) long, there are 80 chains to the mile.) (Note: An Act to reduce and regulate the Tolls payable in respect of Traffic passing between Liverpool and certain Places on the Liverpool, Crosby, and Southport Railway, and also the Payments or Tolls payable to the Lancashire and Yorkshire and East Lancashire Railway Companies in respect of Traffic to and from the last-mentioned Railway; and for other Purposes. (The Liverpool, Crosby and Southport Railway Amendment Act 1853))

In 1850 the LC&SR had been authorised to lease, sell or transfer itself to the L&YR and on 14 June 1855 the L&YR purchased and took over the LC&SR.

The Lancashire and Yorkshire Railway amalgamated with the London and North Western Railway on 1 January 1922 and in turn was Grouped into the London, Midland and Scottish Railway in 1923. Nationalisation followed in 1948.

In 1978 the station became part of the Merseyrail network's Northern Line (operated by British Rail until privatised in 1995).

== Facilities ==
A new toilet building located on the Southport-bound platform was completed in May 2007. Access is by request at the ticket office.

There is a car parking for 56 vehicles, cycle racks for 6 bikes and a secure cycle storage for a further 32 bikes.

In early June 2014 it was announced that the station would be among a small number of stations across the Merseyrail network that would undergo a £3.7m programme of improvements. The improvement plans for the station were revealed at a public meeting at the village church on 20 July 2015, and it includes new waiting rooms and a new ticket office on the Southport Platform, as well as better access to the platforms and car park and a refurbished Footbridge. Work on the scheme started in May 2017. The new ticket office and waiting shelter opened on 2 May 2018 and the platform refurbishment is due to be completed in due course. The station has mounted on its external wall a John Agar (Bury) clock face, the internal workings of which converted from pendulum to electric drive some time ago. The clock face, badly faded by a century of sun, was restored to 'as new' condition and transferred to the new station building to continue the link with a clock maker who supplied clocks to many stations along the line and across the wider north of England network.

== Services ==
Trains operate every 15 minutes throughout the day from Monday to Saturday to Southport to the north, and to Liverpool Central to the south. Sunday services are every 30 minutes in each direction.

Preceding station	National Rail	Following station
Hillside towards Southport	Merseyrail; Northern Line	Freshfield towards Liverpool Central
	Historical railways	
Birkdale Park towards Southport	Lancashire and Yorkshire Railway; Liverpool, Crosby and Southport Railway	Freshfield towards Liverpool Exchange

== Gallery ==
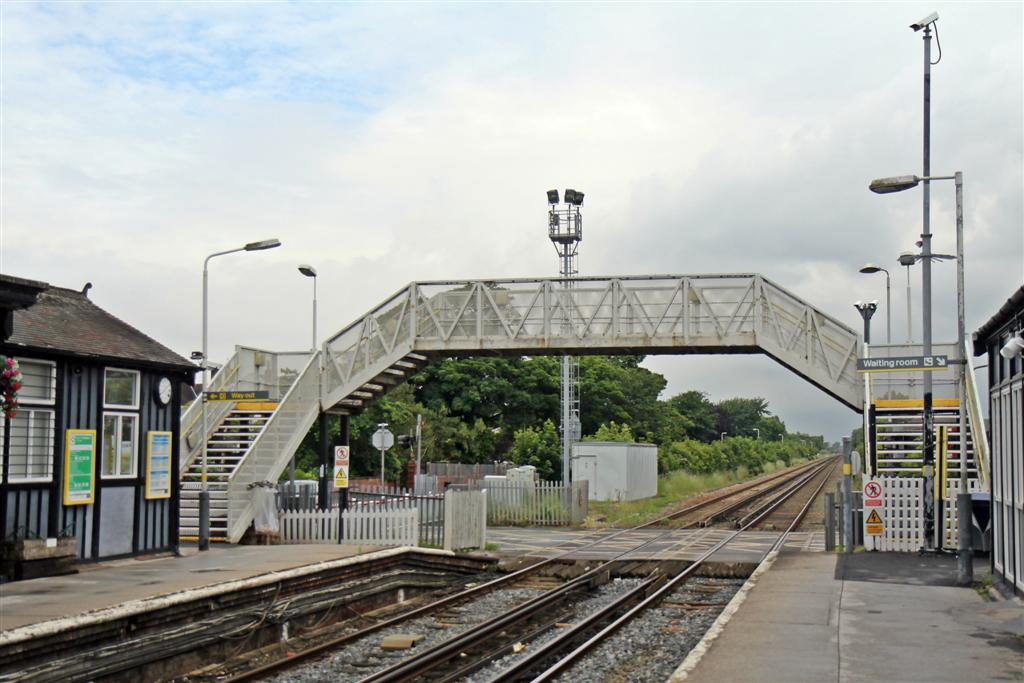
The footbridge and level crossing, before refurbishment.

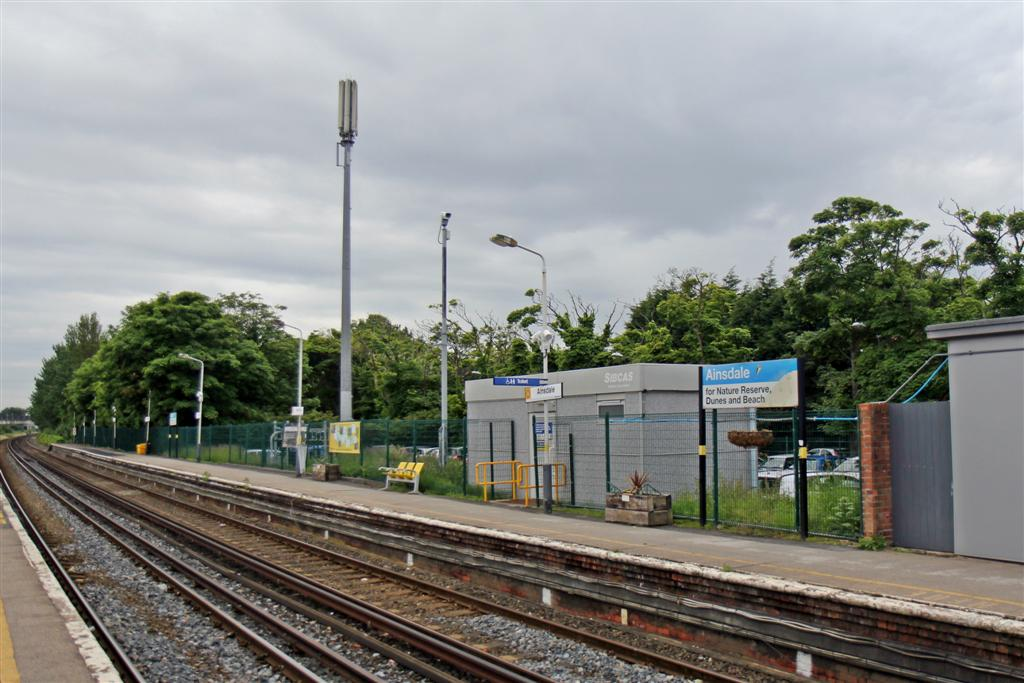
The northbound platform.

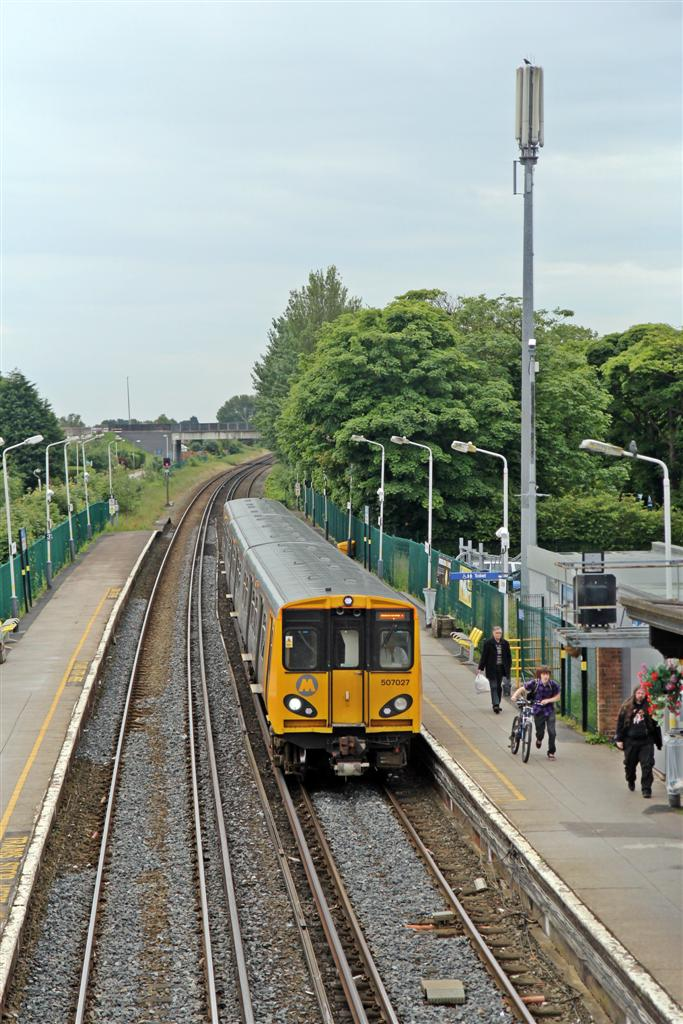
A Merseyrail class 507 waits at the station, viewed from the footbridge.

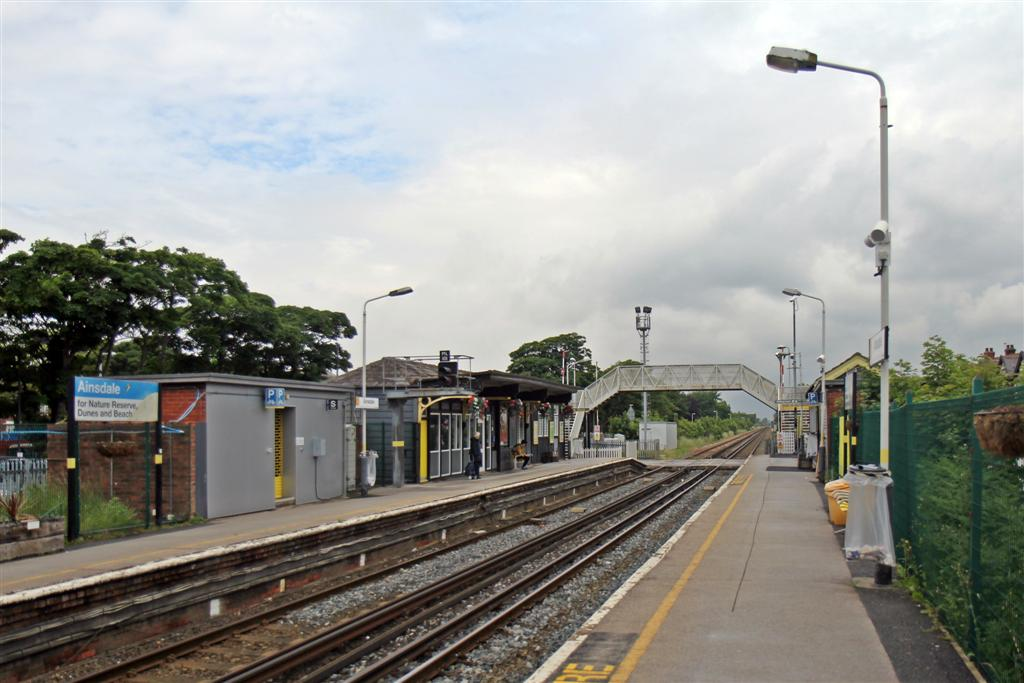
A broad view of the platforms and footbridge.
