= St Andrew's Church, Liverpool =

Coordinates: 53.4030°N 2.9727°W

Church of Saint Andrew, Liverpool
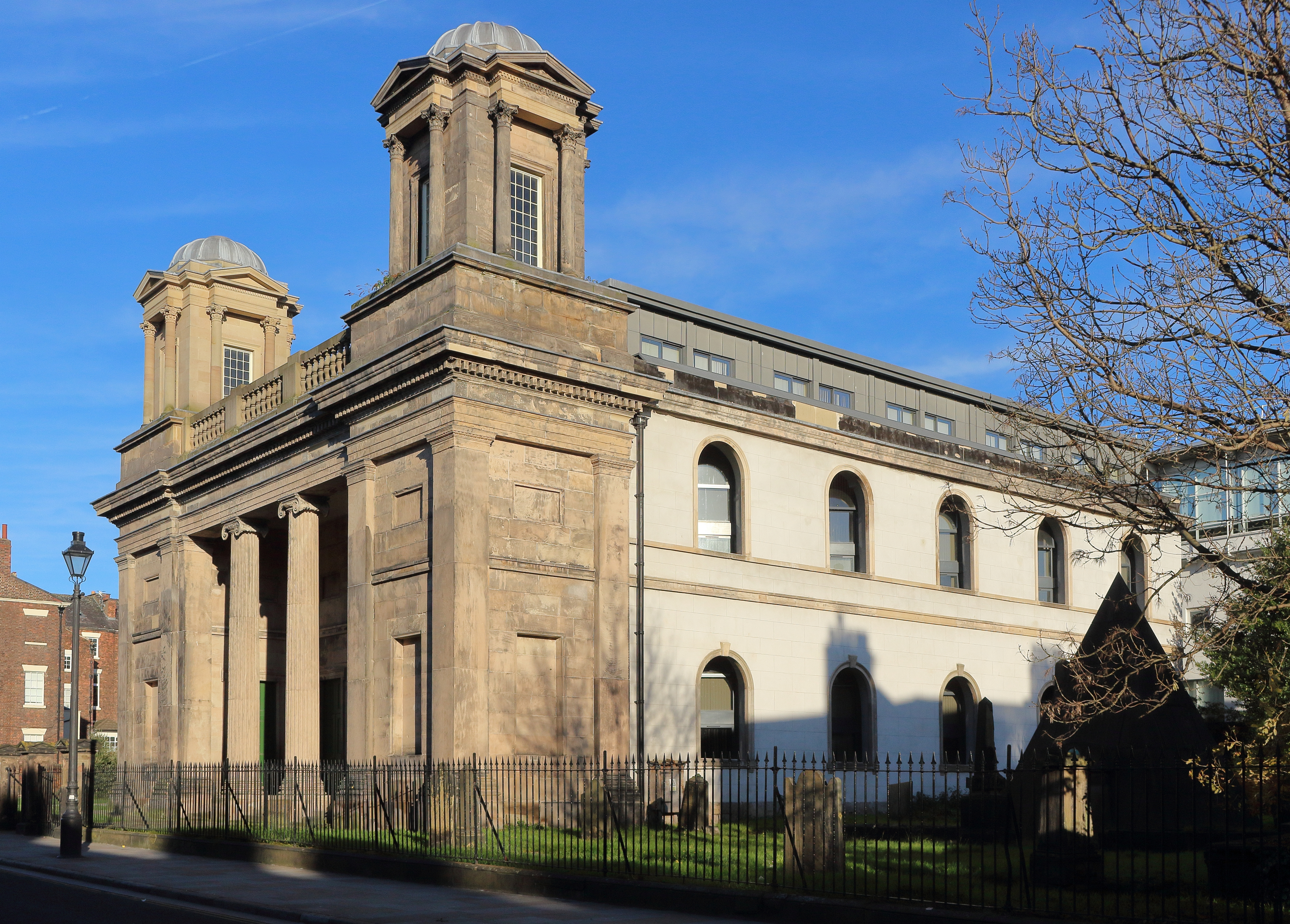
- Church of Saint Andrew, Liverpool, from the southwest

- Location in Merseyside
- OS grid reference: SJ 354 900
- Location: Rodney Street, Liverpool, Merseyside
- Country: England
- Denomination: Church of Scotland

History
- Dedication: Saint Andrew

Architecture
- Functional status: Redundant
- Heritage designation: Grade II*
- Designated: 28 June 1952
- Architect(s): Daniel Stewart, John Foster
- Architectural type: Church
- Style: Greek Revival
- Groundbreaking: 17 June 1823
- Completed: 1824
- Closed: 1975

The Church of Saint Andrew is a former Presbyterian church building in Rodney Street, Liverpool, Merseyside, England. It was part of the Church of Scotland. The church is recorded in the National Heritage List for England as a designated Grade II* listed building, and before redevelopment was on its Heritage at Risk Register.

== History ==
The body of the church was designed by Daniel Stewart, the surveyor of the Scottish Presbyterian Church committee of management, and the façade by John Foster, the senior surveyor of the Corporation of Liverpool. The foundation stone was laid on 17 June 1823, and the church opened the following year on 3 December.

The church closed in 1975, with the Church of Scotland congregation meeting in the Radcliffe Room at Liverpool Cathedral. The congregation disbanded following a special service on 27 November 2016, where the Rt Rev Dr Russell Barr, Moderator of the General Assembly of the Church of Scotland preached.

=== Fire and deterioration ===
The building was seriously damaged by fire on 5 November 1983, which was treated as an arson attack. The fire service estimated that around 80 percent of the building was damaged or destroyed. One of the towers was subsequently demolished because it was unsafe.

The church and its surrounding graveyard were purchased privately in 1990 by Dr Amoolyh Prasad, with plans to restore the building and open it as offices and medical consulting rooms. After falling further into disrepair, Prasad was court-ordered in 2003 to pay £230,000 to architects who were not paid for their work on the church.

=== Restoration ===
In 2008, after spending £100,000 on legal fees to acquire the site and a further £150,000 since on emergency repairs, Liverpool City Council acquired the site. After facing an uncertain future, it was placed on the Buildings At Risk Register, with its condition stated to be "very poor".

In December 2011 it was announced that the church would be restored and developed into accommodation for 100 students, with redevelopment work to include the rebuilding of one of the church's turrets and a remodelling of the exterior.

As of 2015 the facade of the building has been completely restored and successfully preserved, with the former building now rebuilt to provide student accommodation known as "St Andrew's Place".

== Architecture ==
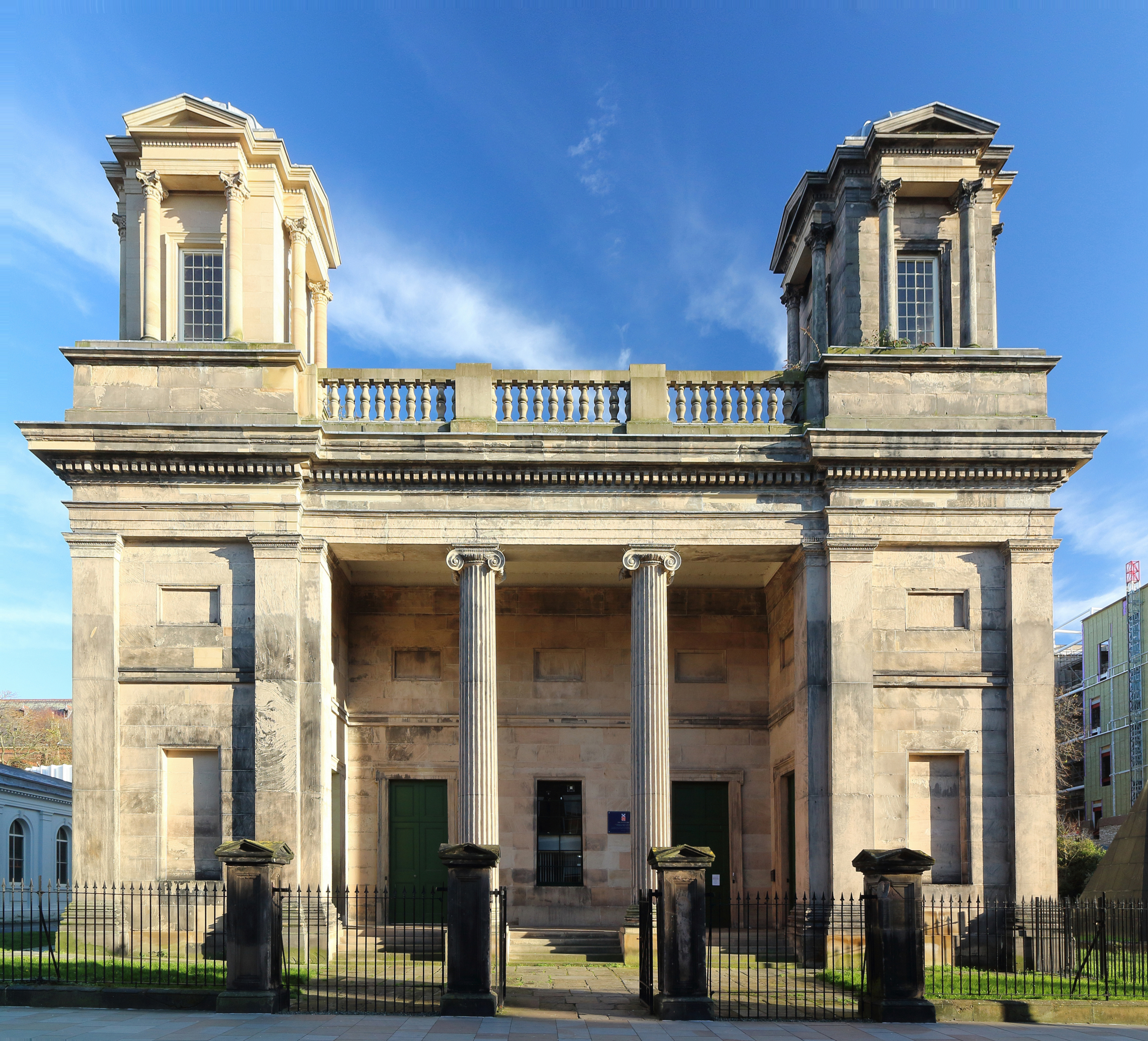
Restored Facade of St. Andrew

The body of the church is constructed in rendered brick, and contains round-headed windows. The façade is in ashlar in Greek Revival style. It contains a recessed portico with Ionic columns, and square towers at the corners surmounted by small domes. In the National Heritage List for England it is described as "a distinguished building in a desperate condition".

== Mackenzie Monument ==
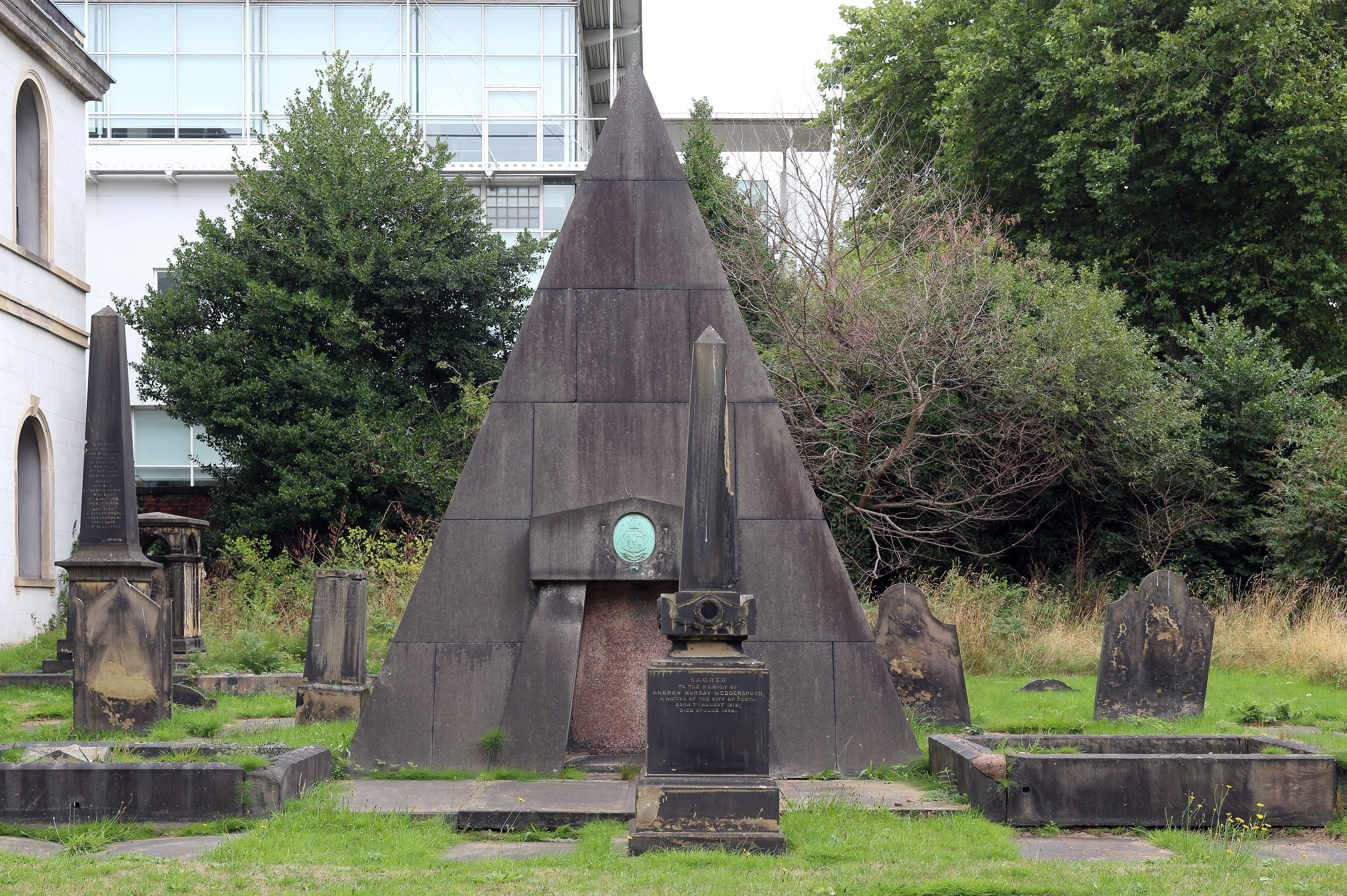

Adjacent to the church in the churchyard is a monument to William Mackenzie, a railway contractor who died in 1851. It is in the shape of a pyramid, is constructed in granite, and was erected in 1868. Facing the street is a blind entrance flanked by uprights supporting a lintel containing a bronze plaque. The structure is a Grade II listed building.

There is a tradition, popularized by the famous Liverpool writer Tom Slemen that, as Mackenzie was a gambling man, he sold his soul to the Devil, and that his body was placed in a seating position above ground within the pyramid, in order that the Devil might not claim him. His ghost is said to haunt Rodney Street.

== See also ==
- Grade II* listed buildings in Liverpool – City Centre
