= Prescot Museum =

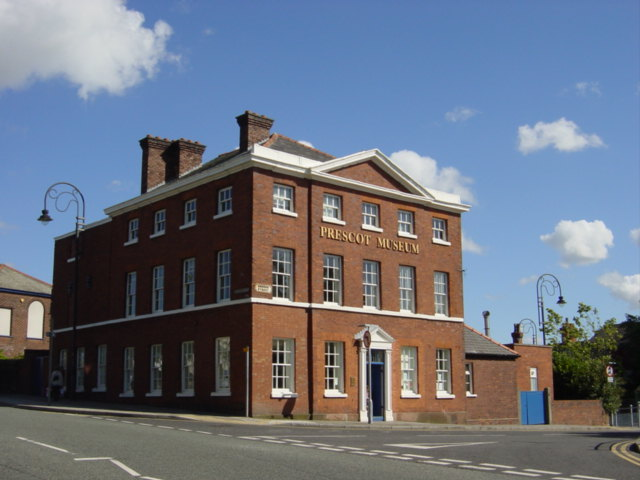
- Previous museum building on Church Street
- Former name: Derby Museum
- Established: 1982
- Location: Prescot, Knowsley, England, United Kingdom
- Coordinates: 53.4285051°N 2.8035843°W
- Website: www.prescotmuseum.org.uk

Prescot Museum is a local museum in Prescot, England. The museum focuses on topics relating to the history of Knowsley, its people and local industries such as coalmining and watchmaking. In 2012 the museum building was purchased by the Shakespeare North Trust and its contents now reside in Prescot Shopping Centre.

== History ==
The previously named Prescot Museum of Clock and Watch Making was opened 29 April 1982 by historian A. J. P. Taylor as a special interest museum dedicated to the area's local involvement in the manufacture of timepieces. Later the museum expanded its collection to textiles, numismatics and militaria.

== Exhibits ==
Currently the museum holds a total of 4,000 objects; most of which being photographs and ephemera. Larger items include costumes, tools, clock movements and various types of pottery.

== Museum Building ==
The building in which the museum formerly resided, Cockpit House, was a Georgian Townhouse that became Grade II listed in 1987.
