= James Newlands =

Scottish civil engineer

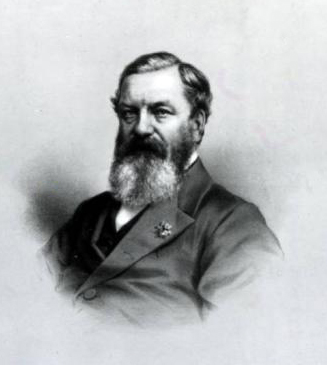
- Born: James Newlands; 28 July 1813; Edinburgh, Scotland
- Died: 15 July 1871 (aged 57); Liverpool, England
- Occupation: Civil engineer
- Years active: 1827 - c.1871
- Notable work: Liverpool sewerage system
- Parents: Thomas Newlands (father); Janet McKay (mother)

James Newlands (28 July 1813 – 15 July 1871) was a Scottish civil engineer who worked in Liverpool as the first Borough Engineer appointed in the United Kingdom. He is credited with designing and implementing the first integrated sewerage system in the world in 1848. His new sewerage system prevented raw sewage from contaminating drinking water thereby reducing the number of deaths caused by cholera and other water-borne diseases.

== Early life ==
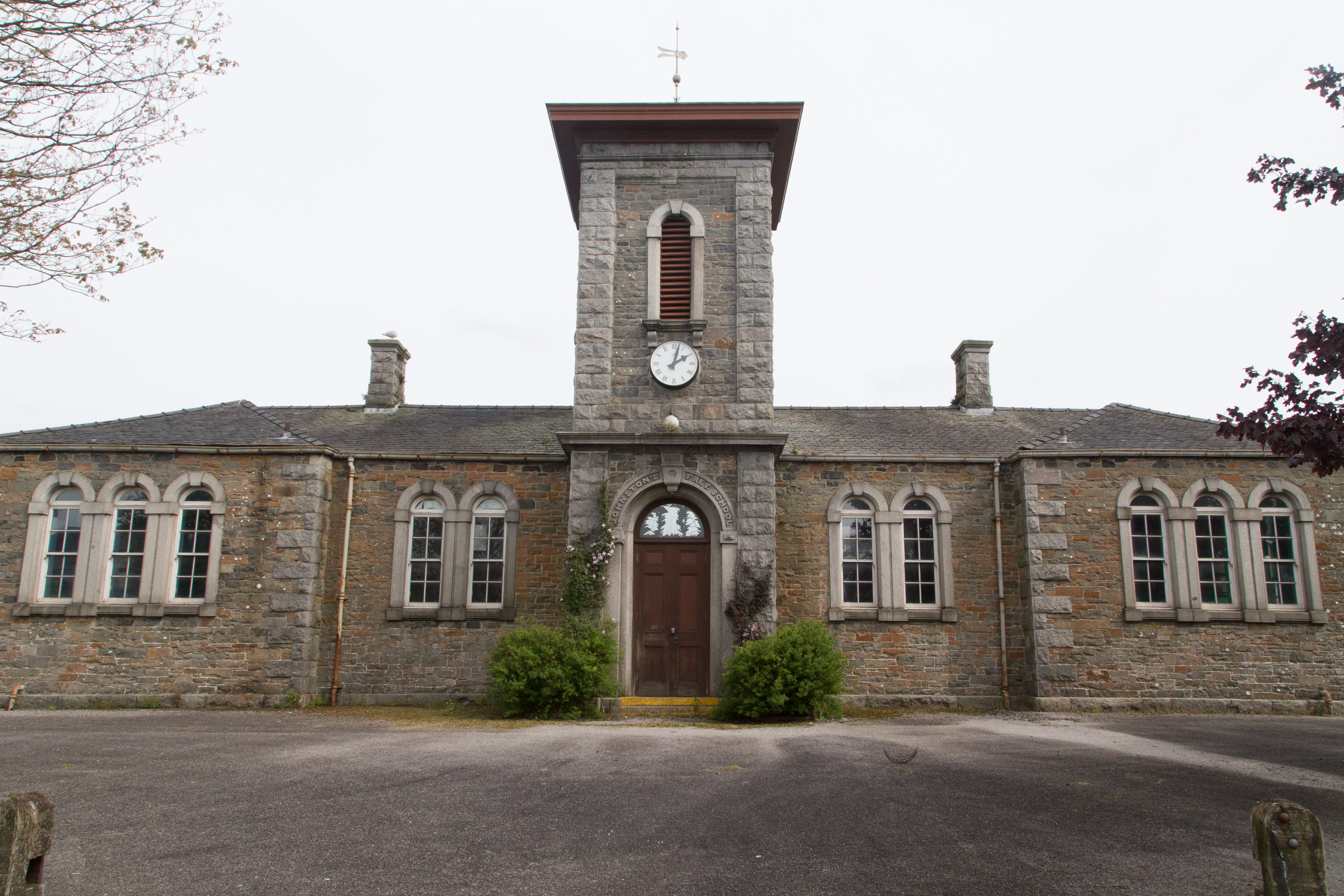
Johnston's Free School, Kirkcudbright

Newlands was born in Edinburgh, the third of nine children of Janet Mckay and Thomas Newlands, a ropemaker. He attended the Royal High School, Edinburgh and then studied mathematics and natural philosophy at the University of Edinburgh. He also became an accomplished draughtsman and was trained as a musician, playing the flute and piano. Newlands became apprenticed (c. 1827) to Edinburgh Corporation architect, Thomas Brown, and then worked for Professor Low of the University's school of agriculture, during which time he illustrated Low's book Elements of Practical Agriculture, was involved in the design of farm buildings, and produced agricultural models. He received additional training in chemistry, mathematics and mechanics, and wrote copiously for Encyclopaedia Britannica and other publications. In 1847, he designed the Johnston's Free School in Kirkcudbright in Galloway, Scotland. He married in 1845, but was widowed in 1848 and never remarried, living in his later years with his sister, Jessie.

== Liverpool ==
Newlands was one of a celebrated trio of pioneering officers appointed under a private act, the 1846 Liverpool Sanitary Act, by the Borough of Liverpool Health of Towns Committee. The other officers appointed under the Act were William Henry Duncan, Medical Officer for Health, and Thomas Fresh, Inspector of Nuisances (an early antecedent of the environmental health officer). One of five applicants for the post, Newlands was appointed Borough Engineer of Liverpool on 26 January 1847. He was paid a salary of £700, plus a horse and 'vehicle'.

In his first year, he made a careful and exact survey of Liverpool and its surroundings, involving somewhere about 3,000 geodetical observations, and resulting in the construction of a contour map of the town and its environs, on a scale of one inch to 20 feet (6.1 m). From this elaborate survey Newlands proceeded to lay down a comprehensive system of outlet and contributory sewers, and main and subsidiary drains, to an aggregate extent of nearly 300 miles (480 km). The details of this projected system he presented to the Corporation in April 1848. One of the most successful and innovative elements of his design was the oval or egg-shaped sewage tunnels. The shape was crucial to ensuring water flowed freely and easily and enabled solid matters to be transported through the sewage system without blockages forming.

In July 1848, ten years before London began its similar endeavours following the Great Stink, James Newlands' sewer construction programme began, and over the next 11 years 86 miles (138 km) of new sewers were built. Between 1856 and 1862 another 58 miles (93 km) were added. This programme was completed in 1869. Before the sewers were built, life expectancy in Liverpool was 19 years, and by the time Newlands retired, it had more than doubled.

During the Siege of Sevastopol (1854–55), the British government wrote to the Mayor and Corporation of Liverpool, asking that Newlands might be permitted to vacate his post and proceed to the Crimea as Sanitary Commissioner, to assist in relieving the 'pestilence' which was contributing to the high casualties among British and allied forces. Florence Nightingale later wrote to him, saying "Truly I may say that to us sanitary salvation came from Liverpool."

Newlands was an early proponent for a ring-road serving Liverpool (not realised for another 50 years, when Queens Drive was constructed by his successor as borough engineer, John Alexander Brodie). In addition to his sewerage projects, he also worked extensively on Liverpool's highways, designed the Cornwallis Street and Margaret Street Baths, and improved the city's lighting. Newlands had a forward-thinking holistic view of public health, which was a driver for his other projects, like the provision of public baths. He was the main pioneer of sewage systems that not only transformed Liverpool but were so well thought out and constructed, they continue to be effective and have greater longevity than modern constructions.

== Legacy ==
Newlands wrote several books, and was a contributor to the Encyclopædia Britannica. He was also an accomplished musician and artist, creating several hundred sketches. Several of his paintings were exhibited at the Royal Scottish Academy. After long bouts of ill-health, he died in Liverpool in 1871, aged 57, shortly after his retirement as borough engineer.

== Honours ==
There is a plaque to James Newlands in Abercromby Square, Liverpool, erected by the Institution of Civil Engineers in 2007.

In 2020 he was inducted into the Scottish Engineering Hall of Fame.

== Bibliography ==
- Cross-Rudkin, Peter; Chrimes, Mike (2008). A Biographical Dictionary of Civil Engineers in Great Britain and Ireland: Vol 2: 1830 to 1890. Thomas Telford. ISBN 978-0-7277-3504-1.
- Olsen, G N (June 1997). "Liverpool's drainage history: seventeenth century to MEPAS" (PDF). Proceedings of the Institution of Civil Engineers - Municipal Engineer. 121 (2): 67–77. doi:10.1680/imuen.1997.29487.
- Minutes (1872). "Obituary. James Newlands, 1813-1871". Minutes of the Proceedings of the Institution of Civil Engineers. XXXIII (1872): 227–231. doi:10.1680/imotp.1872.22904. Session 1871-72 — Part I. (clickable Newlands obituary)
- Sheard, Sally (31 July 2014). James Newlands and the origins of the municipal engineer (PDF). Institute of Civil Engineers. Archived (PDF) from the original on 12 September 2018.

== Works ==
- The Carpenter and Joiner's Assistant, 1860.
