= William Henry Duncan =

English doctor

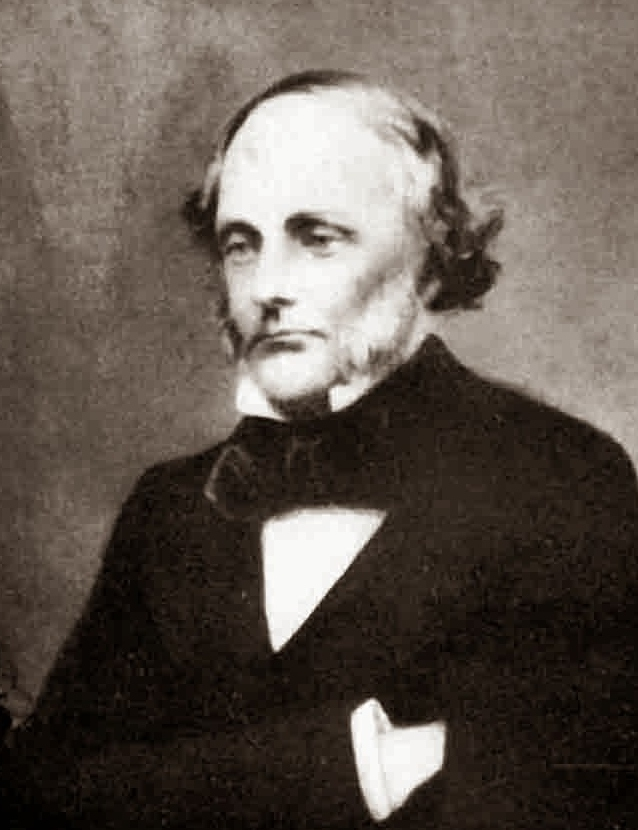
- Born: 27 January 1805; Liverpool, England
- Died: 23 May 1863 (aged 58); Scotland
- Burial place: Westpark, Elgin
- Occupation: medical doctor
- Known for: first in the world to become a Medical Officer of Health
- Notable work: Liverpool Sanitary Act 1846
- Relatives: James Currie

William Henry Duncan (27 January 1805 – 23 May 1863), also known as Doctor Duncan, was an English medical doctor who was born in Liverpool, the first in the world to become a Medical Officer of Health.

== Early life and career ==
Duncan was born on Seel Street, Liverpool on 27 January 1805 to Scottish parents. He was the nephew of James Currie, an earlier influential Liverpool physician.

He was also the nephew of Henry Duncan of Ruthwell and received his early education in Scotland, under Henry Duncan's protection.

William Henry Duncan qualified as a medical doctor in Edinburgh in 1829, returning to Liverpool to work in general practice on Rodney Street, the heart of the medical quarter and as a physician at the Liverpool Royal Infirmary.

He became a lecturer in the theory of medical law and theory (Jurisprudence) at the Royal Institution and worked at three local dispensaries, which were set up to treat patients who could not afford to pay for medical bills.

During this time, he developed strong sympathies with the neglected downtrodden section of the community and he campaigned against terrible living conditions of his patients and to improve the sanitation of Liverpool.

== Campaign work and acting on data ==
Duncan challenged the commonly held conception that it was the fault of the poor themselves that they became ill, he viewed social poverty as the cause, not individuals and looked to things like improving housing and sanitation to help the situation.

Housing in Liverpool was dark, poorly ventilated, damp and overcrowded, with no provision for human or other waste. Liverpool had not only the worst type of cellar dwelling, but also a larger proportion of its inhabitants living in cellars than any other town. The population living in court housing generally made use of privies and it was common practice to dispose of the contents by spreading them over the courts, so many of the cellar dwellers were frequently knee deep in sewage.

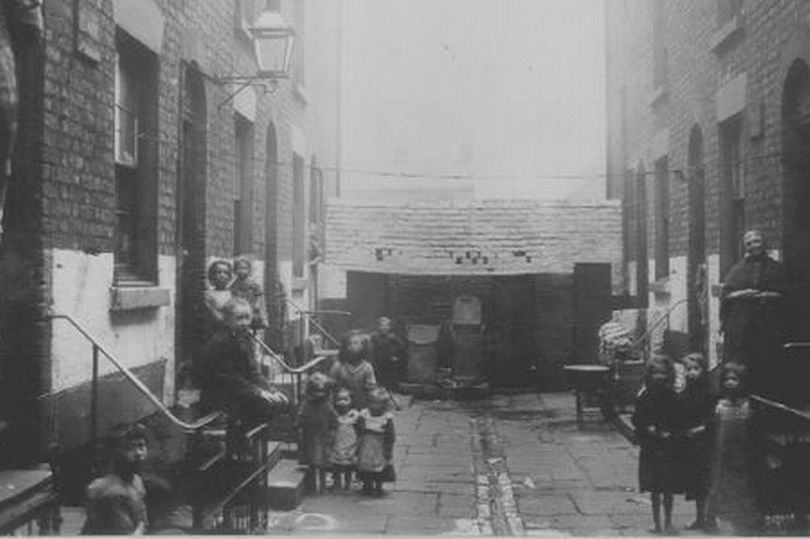
19th Century Court Housing Liverpool

In 1822 a commission of sewers was established and over the next 20 years built 30 miles of sewers, but these were for surface water drainage only, houses did not connect to their drains.

In 1840 Dr Duncan was one of the numerous medical practitioners who submitted reports – including the Report on the Sanitary State of the Labouring Classes in Liverpool as evidence to Edwin Chadwick’s Poor Law Commission.

His evidence is given in vol 2, 31st August 1840, where Duncan remarked, “There can be little doubt that the causes of the unusual prevalence of this disease in Liverpool are to be found principally in the condition of the dwellings of the labouring classes, who are almost exclusively its victims; but partly also in some circumstances connected with the habits of the poor.

With regard to their dwellings I would point out as the principal circumstances affecting the health of the poor:

1. Imperfect ventilation
2. Want of places of deposit for vegetable and animal refuse
3. Imperfect drainage and sewerage
4. Imperfect system of scavenging and cleansing

The circumstances derived from their habits most prejudicial to their health I conceive to be:

1. Their tendency to congregate in too large numbers under the same roof etc.
2. Want of cleanliness
3. Indisposition to be removed to the hospital when ill with fever".

In 1843 Dr Duncan gave two lectures to the Literary and Philosophical Society – On The Physical Causes Of The High Rate of Mortality in Liverpool.

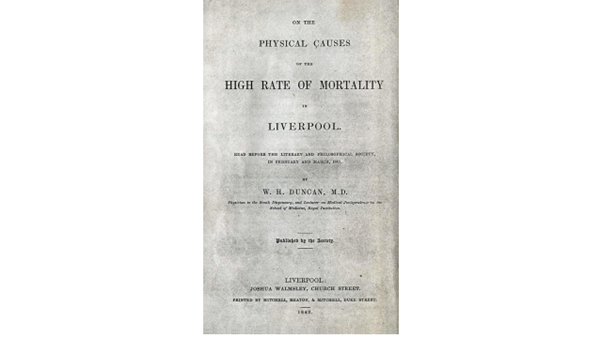
High Rate of Mortality Liverpool Pamphlet

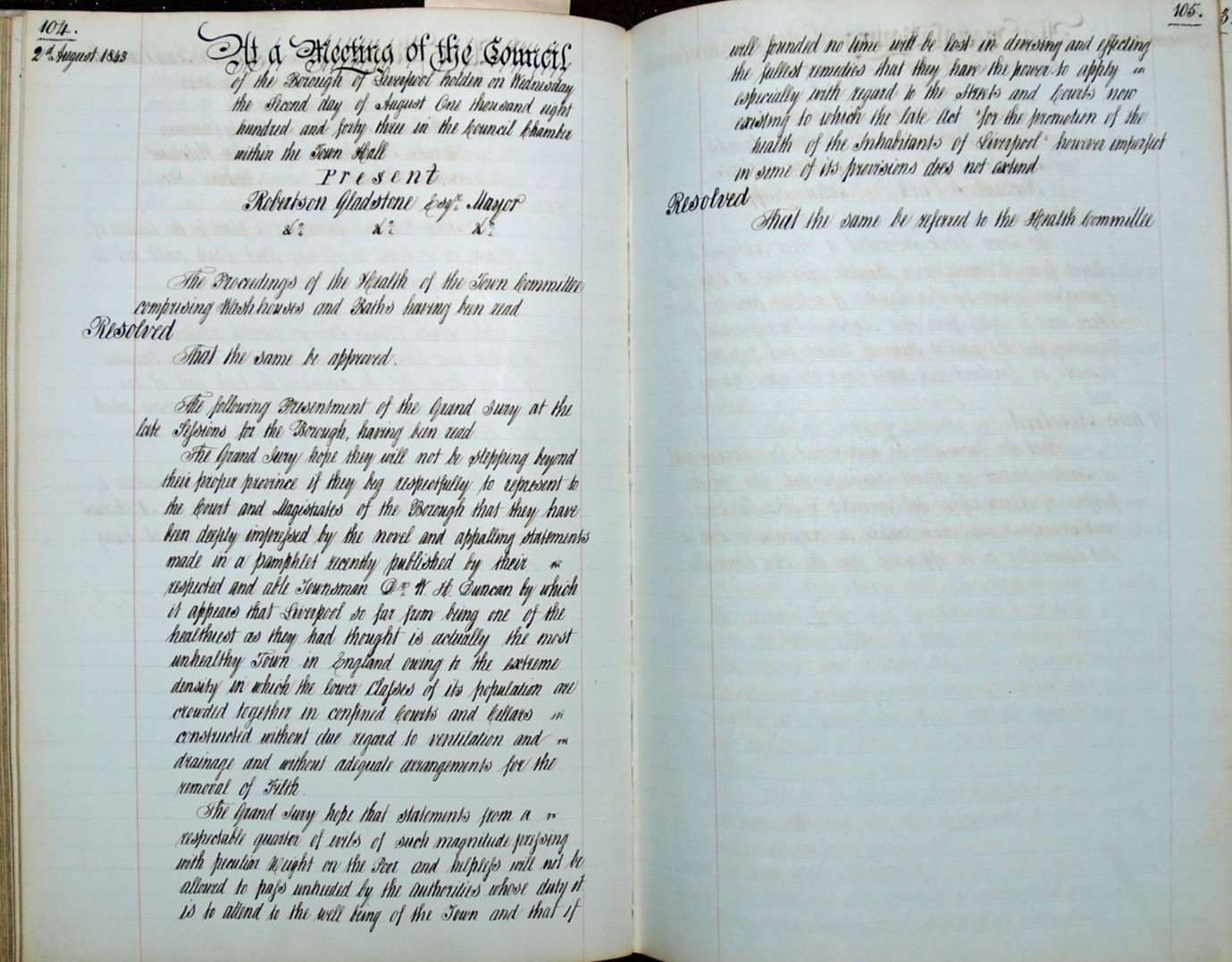
Minutes of Liverpool Council Meeting 1843

The lecture was also published as a pamphlet which had an immediate effect upon the Council, who realised that something had to be done.

Council Minutes 2nd August 1843 ‘…they have been deeply impressed by the novel and appalling statements made in a pamphlet recently published by their respected and able Townsman Dr W H Duncan by which it appears that Liverpool so far away from one of the healthiest as they had thought is actually the most unhealthy town in England owing to the extreme density in which the lower classes of its population are crowded together in confined Courts and Cellars constructed without due regard to ventilation and drainage and without adequate arrangements for the removal of filth.’

His lecture and pamphlet effectively inspired the Council to compile and pass the Liverpool Sanitary Act 1846, which in turn, acknowledged that a medical person was needed to tackle the many complex issues.

Duncan used statistics compiled by William Farr to demonstrate that the average age of death in the rural communities of Rutland and Wiltshire was 36.5 years, while in Liverpool it was 19.5 years.

In the absence of all but the most rudimentary vital statistics, Duncan collected data comparing sickness absence rates between the wealthy and the less wealthy neighbourhoods - an early example of inequalities in health research.

== The Liverpool Sanitary Act 1846 ==
The Liverpool Sanitary Act 1846 laid down minimum standards for the construction of dwellings and outlawed the practice of living in cellars, the act also acknowledged that a medical person was needed to tackle the many complex issues; it led directly to the appointment of Britain’s first medical officer of health.

The Liverpool Sanitary Act 1846 was promoted by the local authority, not central government; it led the way and influenced the drafting of the Public Health Act 1848 (11 & 12 Vict. c. 63).

This act created a sanitary code and established that public health was an essential activity of local government.

== Appointment as Medical Officer for Health ==
Duncan was appointed Medical Officer of Health on 1 January 1847 and he was the first person to hold the post in both the city and the country.

When appointed as Medical Officer of Health there was no precedent for the role and no resources for him to make use of. He had to organise a Public Health Department from scratch and lay down rules of administration and procedure, train staff and fit himself and activities into the framework of the Town Council organization.

Originally employed as Medical Officer of Health on a part time basis on a salary of £300 a year, in 1848 the post was made full time with a salary of £750. By comparison the town clerk was paid £2000 and the Inspector of Nuisances £170.

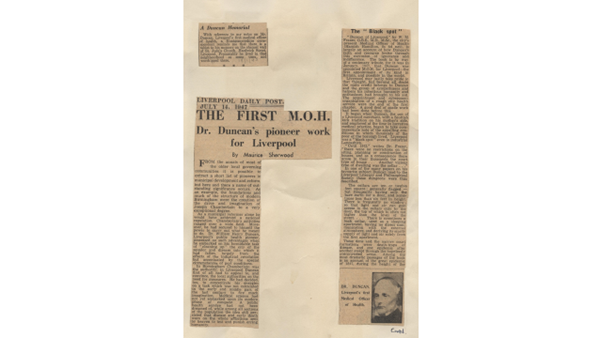
First Medical Officer for Health - Liverpool Post

== Liverpool's first public health team ==
Duncan formed Liverpool’s first Public Health Team, with Thomas Fresh whose job title was Inspector of Nuisances, a forerunner of the environmental health officer role, and James Newlands, Borough Engineer who instigated the first integrated sewerage system in the town and worked to improve the water supply.

They are a celebrated trio of pioneering officers appointed under a private act (the Liverpool Sanatory Act 1846) by the Borough's Health of the Town Committee and worked to identify insanitary dwellings and practices, with Duncan then able to take court action to have the dwellings cleansed and the practices stopped or moved.

== Outbreaks and health inequalities ==
One of Duncan’s first challenges faced as Medical Officer for Health came with the influx of immigrants arriving in Liverpool due to the Great Famine of Ireland.

Beginning in 1845 the famine carried on throughout 1846 and 1847, with thousands arriving in Liverpool weakened by starvation and malnutrition. With a steady rise of ‘pauper immigration’ Liverpool saw previously vacated cellars once again used out of desperation - causing cholera and typhus to spread rapidly.

In 1847 when Liverpool had a population of 250,000, 5,845 people died of ‘Fever’ and 2,589 died of ‘Diarrhoea’ This was the highest mortality rate ever seen in Liverpool.

It was not possible to clinically distinguish between Typhus, Typhoid and other Fevers, and at this time they were frequently referred to as ‘Irish Famine Fever’.

Duncan did request an embargo on the landing of Irish immigrants in Liverpool, but this was not sanctioned by law. A modified system of quarantine was adopted in July 1847, but he recorded that the only practical effects of this were to transfer those actively suffering with fever to the Hospital ships on the Mersey.

Medical Officer for Health William Mowll Frazer writes in his History of English Public Health 1834-1939 that:

“The Health Committee of 1847, faced with epidemics which they rightly thought arose out of the appalling conditions under which most of the population of the borough lived, strove with the help of their officers to improve the sanitary condition of Liverpool, and in their efforts to this end they achieved a large measure of success. More than that, they perfected an administrative machine that would be used, as the years went by, to effect further improvements…. Perhaps the most important of these steps – and there were many of them – were housing, education, personal hygiene, National Health Insurance, and a general improvement in the standard of living. By the end of the 19th century the sanitary work of the reformers had been largely completed and Liverpool and the majority of the larger towns had reached relatively satisfactory standards of communal cleanliness.”

Duncan worked with the Health Committee, reporting to them, and they supported him as he worked with his team to improve the sanitation of Liverpool. He made use of the powers of the Sanitary Act to enforce necessary improvements in sanitation and dwellings, involving the magistrates to persuade owners to take corrective measures.

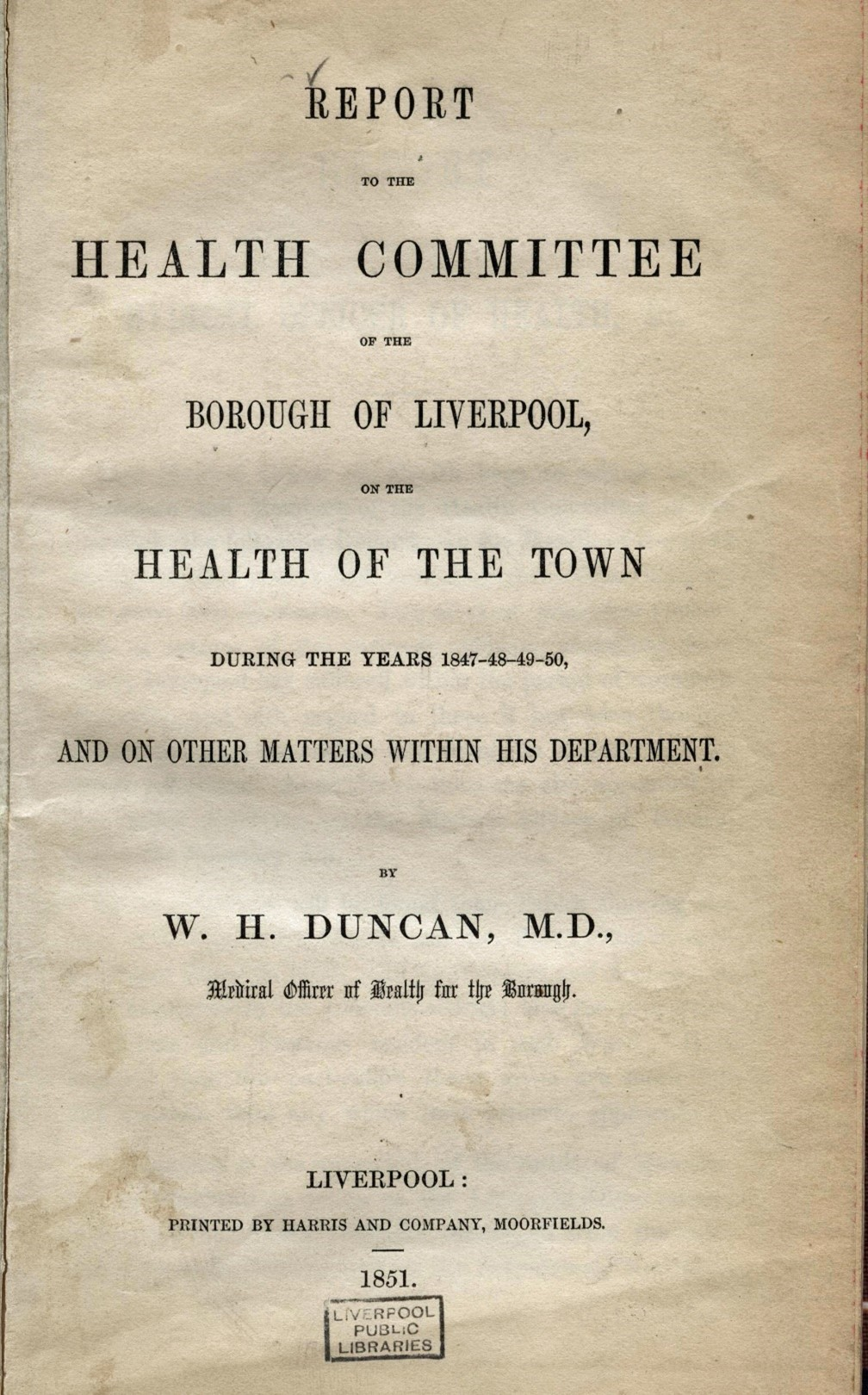
Report to the Health Committee 1851

A team of twenty medical practitioners assisted Duncan in making daily house visits to cholera districts and directing the cleansing and whitewashing of over 3000 houses and this process was outlined by Duncan in his report to the Health Committee in 1851 and was applauded by a professor of hygiene a century later in unambiguous terms: ‘this statement of fundamental principles could hardly be bettered’

He continued to go into the homes of the sick and poor and requests a clerk to help him with office duties so he can concentrate on visiting the stricken area with Duncan stating "I should visit every house in the worst-conditioned districts".

By 1851 10,000 cellars had been cleared of their inhabitants.

== Legacy in the city ==
Duncan made an enormous difference to the life expectancy of the most vulnerable in Liverpool by his meticulous work.

Duncan lived a modest life and died while on holiday in Scotland, aged 57.

Duncan is buried in Westpark, Elgin.

A blue plaque on Seel Street is still in place honouring his contribution to the city and a pub in Liverpool called Doctor Duncan's is named in his honour.

One of the buildings of the Faculty of Medicine at the University of Liverpool is named after William Henry Duncan, The William Henry Duncan Building, whose entrance is off West Derby Street. The building houses the Institute of Ageing and Chronic Disease, research groups from the Institute of Translational Medicine and the Liverpool Biobank. Part funded by the EDRF the building also houses the Liverpool BioInnovation Hub.

A pub, Dr Duncan's, and lecture are named for him.

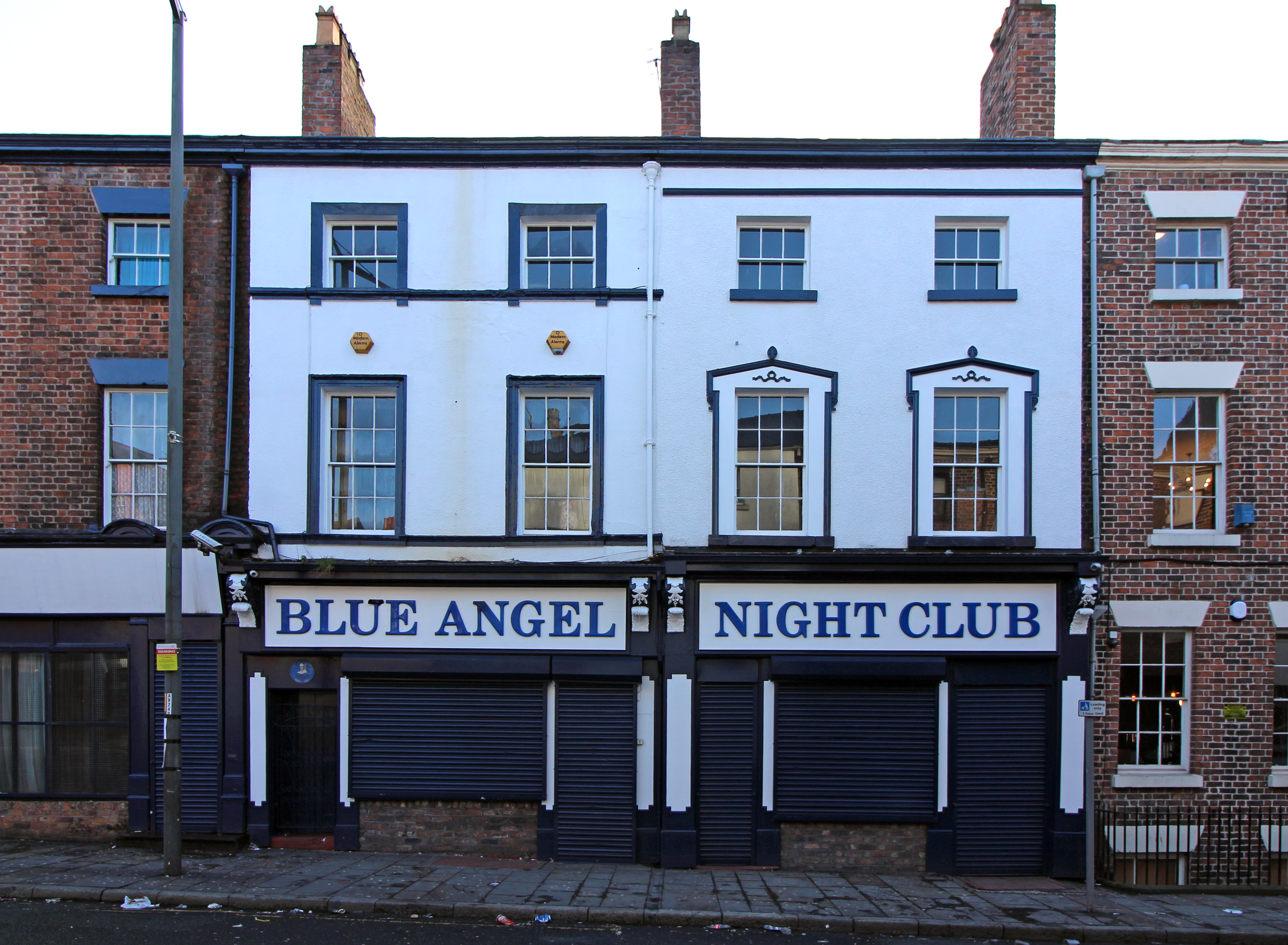
The Blue Angel, birthplace of Duncan

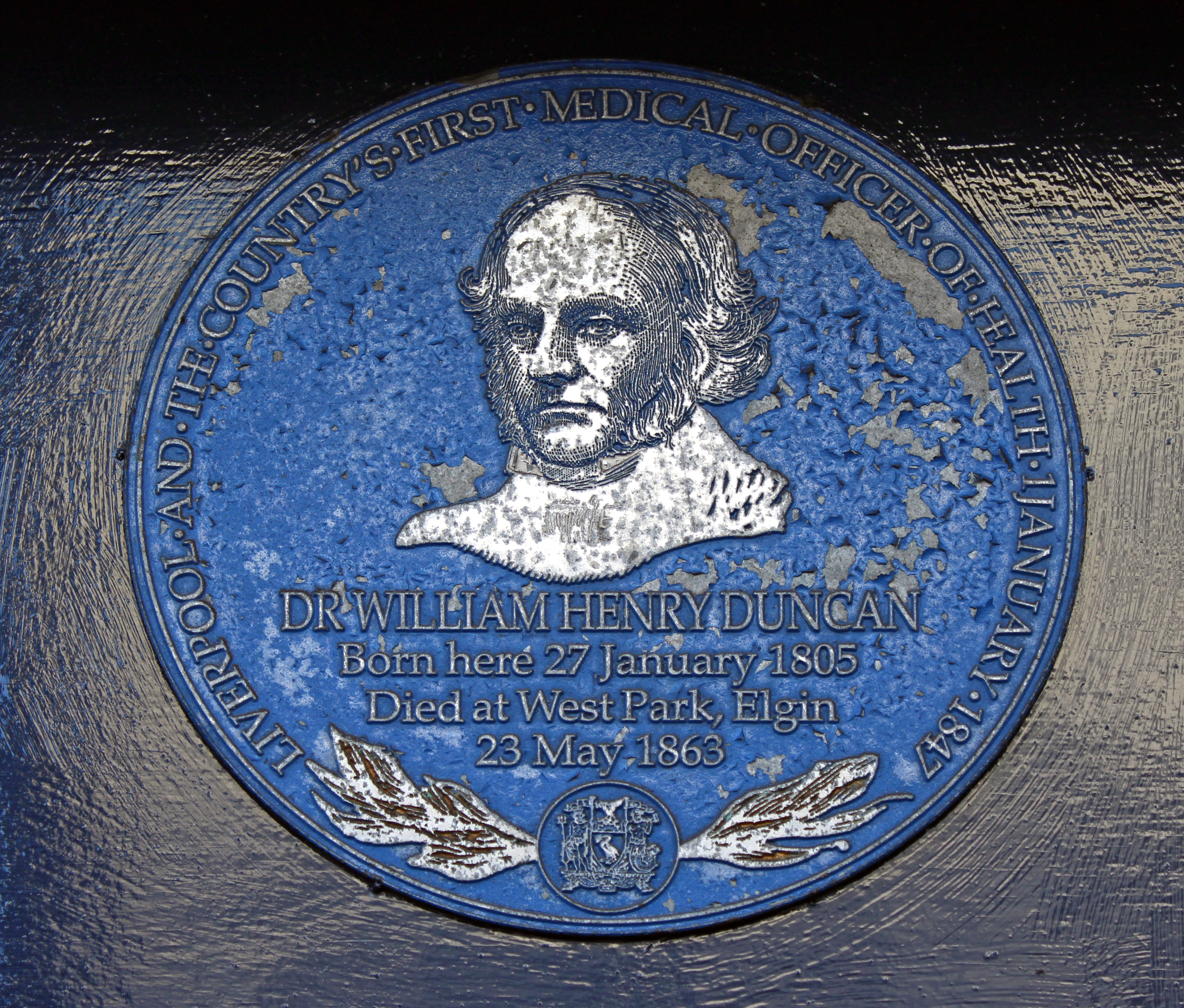
Commemorative plaque at the Blue Angel

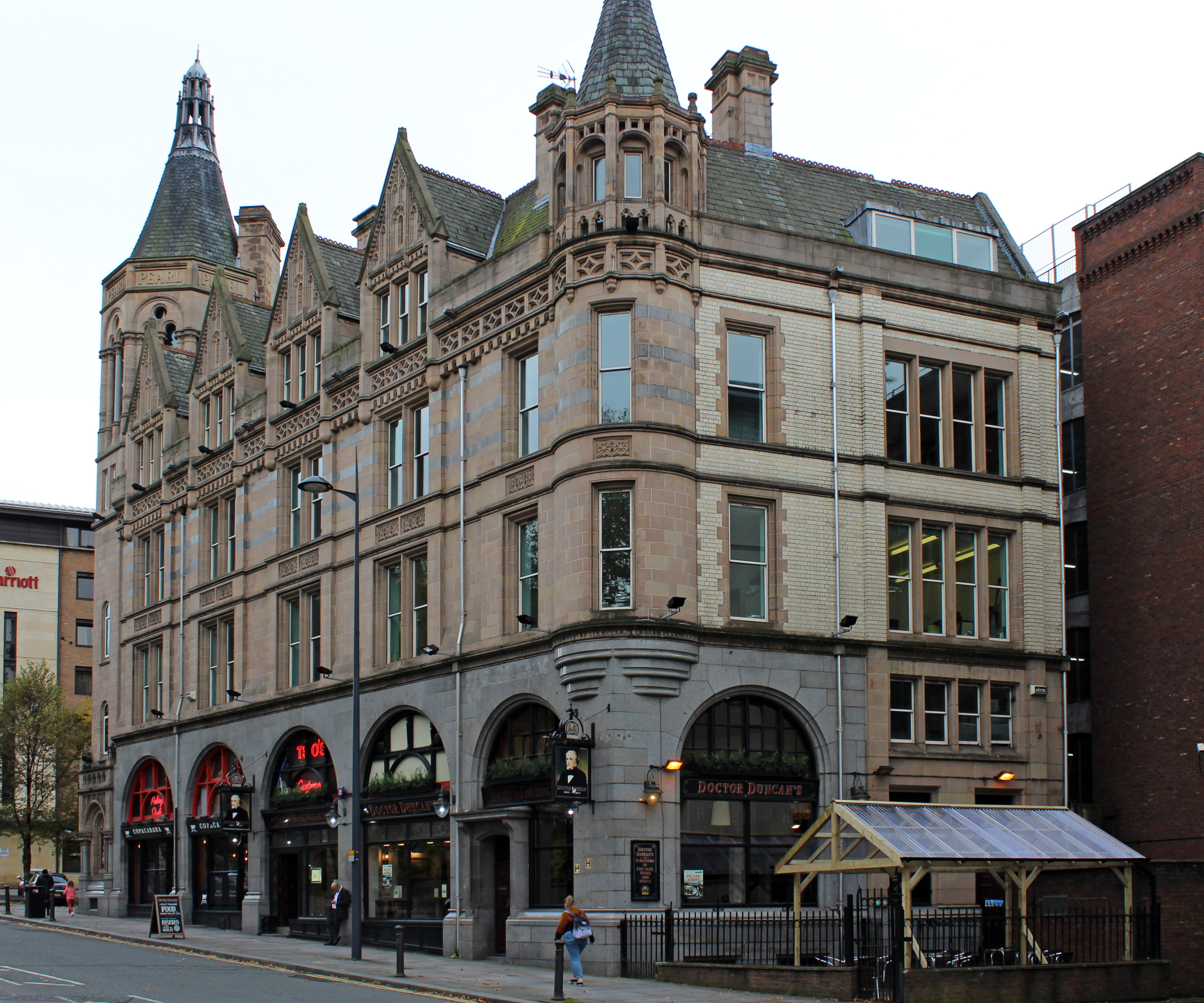
Pub commemorating Duncan

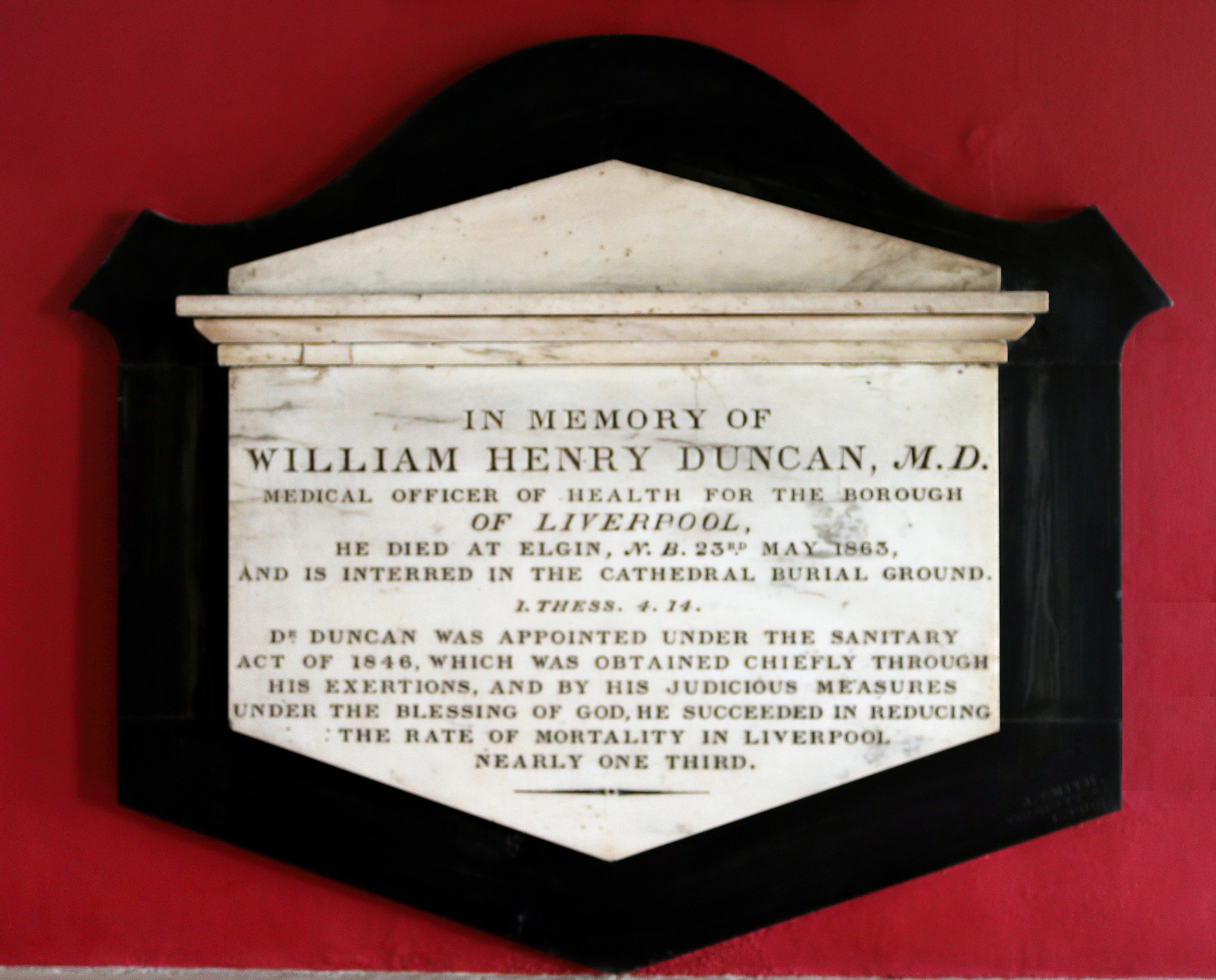
Memorial plaque in the Liverpool Medical Institution

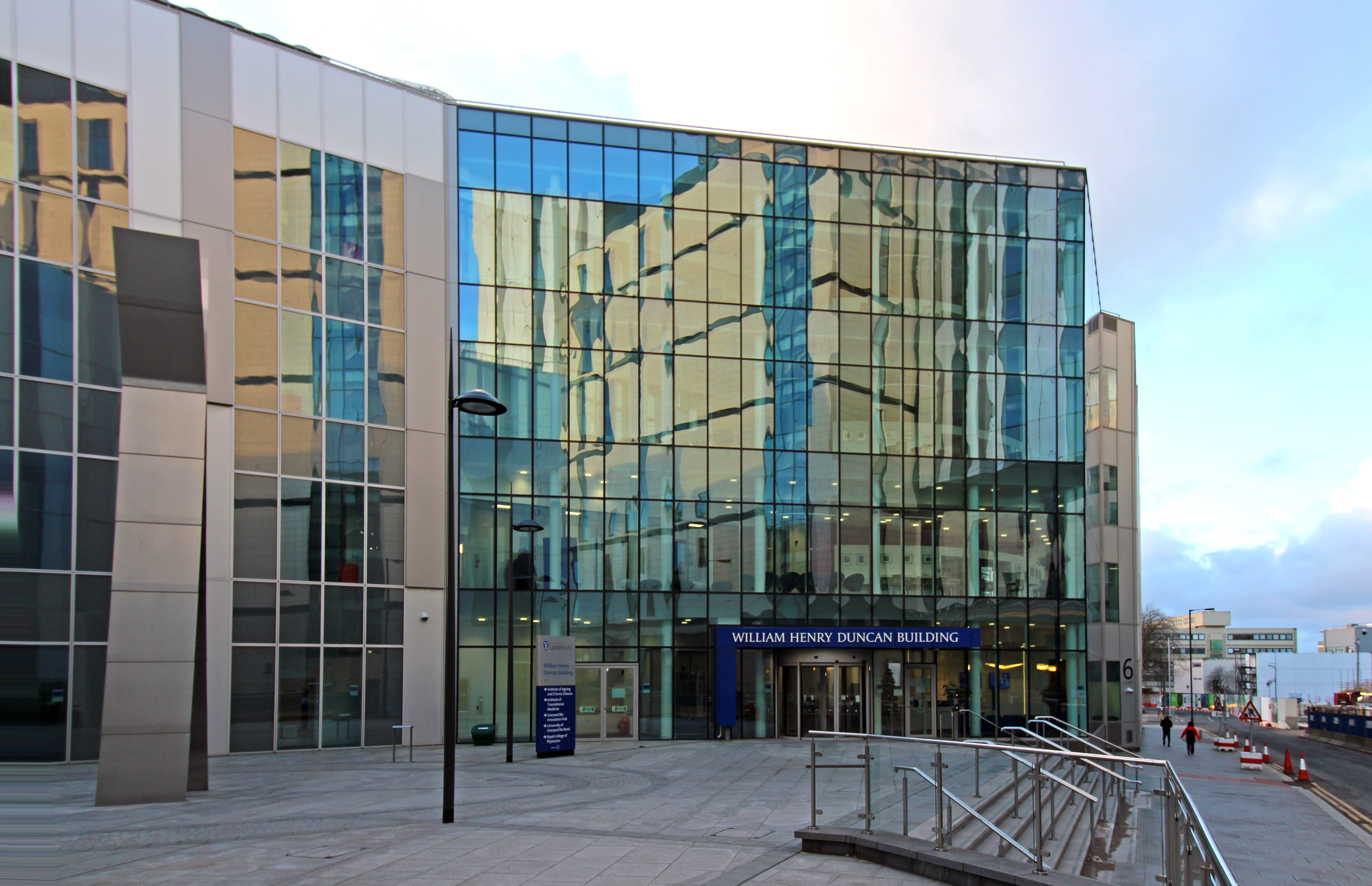
William Henry Duncan Building of the Faculty of Medicine, Liverpool University
