= The Hardmans' House =

Historic photographic studio and museum in Liverpool, Merseyside, England

The Hardmans' House, 59 Rodney Street
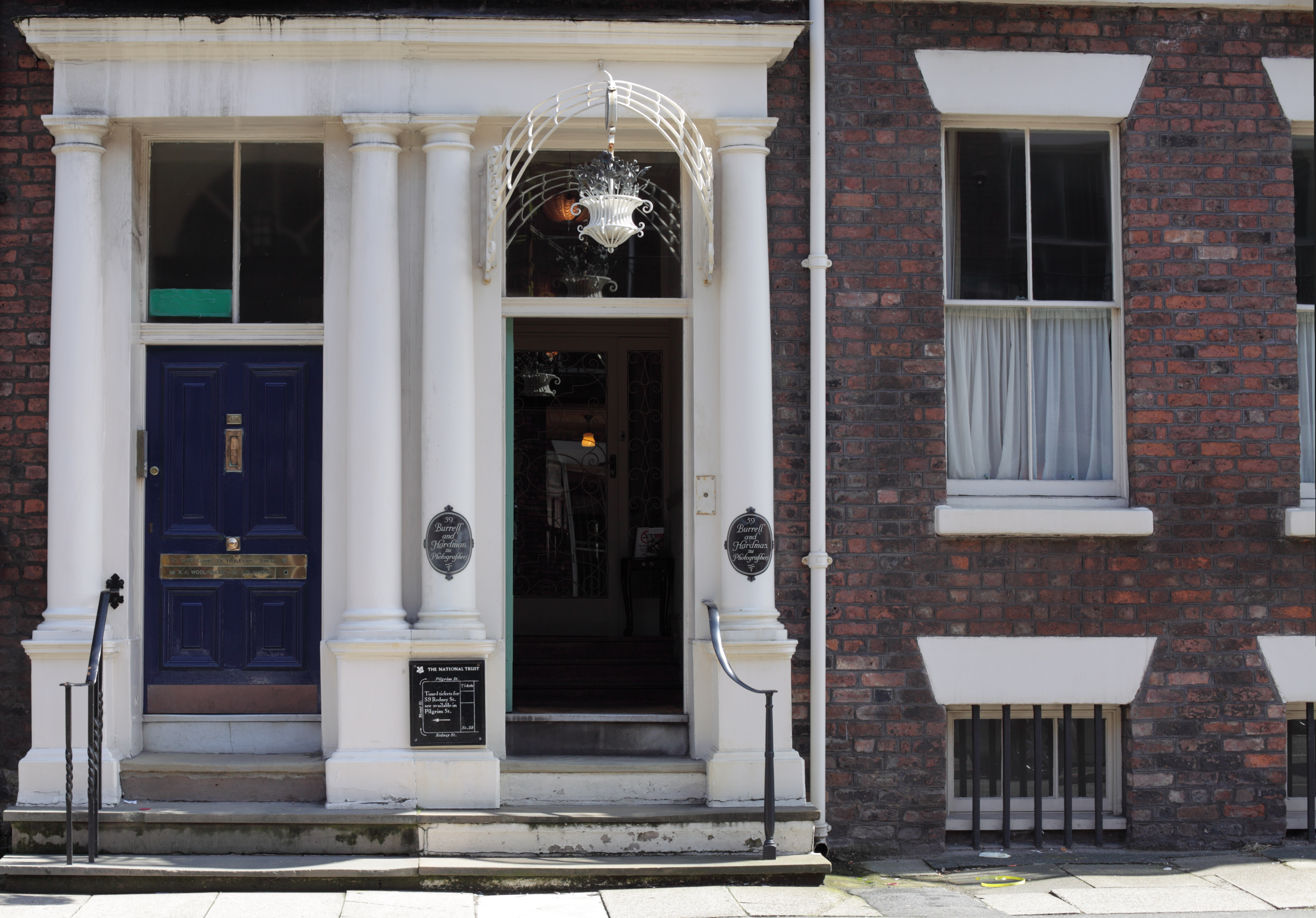
- E. Chambré Hardman's studio

General information
- Location: Liverpool, England
- Coordinates: 53°23′59.4″N 2°58′25.8″W

The Hardmans' House, at 59 Rodney Street, Liverpool, Merseyside, England, is a National Trust property and home of the "E. Chambré Hardman Studio, House & Photographic Collection". The property was acquired by the National Trust in 2003.

The house is a Georgian terraced house which served as both the studio and home of photographer E. Chambré Hardman from 1947 to 1988, as well as his wife, business partner, and fellow photographer, Margaret until her death in 1969. On display are an extensive collection of photographs, the studio where most were taken, as well as the darkroom where they were developed and printed.

The collection consists of portraits of the people of Liverpool, their city and the landscapes of the surrounding countryside.
