= E. Chambré Hardman =

British photographer

Chambré Hardman
- Edward Chambré Hardman wearing his trademark trilby hat.
- Born: Edward Fitzmaurice Chambré Hardman; 25 November 1898; Foxrock, Dublin, Ireland
- Died: 2 April 1988 (aged 89); Sefton General Hospital, Wavertree, Liverpool, England
- Occupation: professional photographer
- Known for: portraits and landscapes
- Spouse: Margaret Mills (1909–1969)

Edward Fitzmaurice Chambré Hardman (25 November 1898 – 2 April 1988) was an Anglo-Irish photographer, later based for most of his career in Liverpool. He was a landscape photographer by vocation, although his business was largely dependent on portraiture.

== Life ==
=== Provenance and early years ===
Hardman was born in 1898 in Foxrock, Dublin, Ireland. He was the third child and only son of the keen amateur photographer Edward Hardman by his marriage to Gertrude Davies. Hardman described his family as Anglo-Irish, and his father as "a land agent for various estate owners and landlords in County Dublin". He also claimed that there family connections with the British Raj.

Hardman took his first photographs aged nine and went on to win many photographic competitions during his time at St. Columba's College in County Dublin.

From the age of eighteen, he spent four years as a regular officer in the 8th Gurkha Rifles in India where he would eventually be promoted to lieutenant. While on active duty at the foothills of the Himalayas, he found time for photography using his Eastman Kodak No. 3 Special camera and processed rolls of film in his bathroom.

Whilst stationed at the Khyber Pass he met Captain Kenneth Burrell (1893–1953), a man who had not planned on an army career but rather hoped to set up a photographic studio back home in Liverpool, England. Hardman and Burrell decided to go into business together and in 1923, Burrell & Hardman took a lease on business premises at 51a Bold Street in Liverpool's fashionable commercial centre. Burrell was in most respects what one source describes as "a silent partner", but he brought to the partnership his excellent contacts in the Liverpool business community. Starting the business was difficult, and Hardman resorted to selling and repairing wirelesses to subsidise the studio. Eventually it gained a reputation for being the place for anyone with distinction in Merseyside to be photographed by Burrell & Hardman. Photographs attributed to Burrell & Hardman are held in the Conway Library at The Courtauld Institute of Art, London, whose archive, of primarily architectural images, is being digitised under the wider Courtauld Connects project.

Hardman was largely self-taught as a landscape photographer, although he was evidently influenced by various contemporaries such as Alexander Keighley. He received some practical instruction in photography from his father, and, by his own account, also received important lessons from Margaret Mills, who later became his wife:

She was about nineteen – the doctor's daughter and the beauty of the district.... She had a half-plate stand camera with several lenses, and used to print her negatives by the Carbon process.... She taught me the rudiments of choosing and composing a subject, and I think you could date the beginning of my interest in landscape to [those] days.

She was a talented photographer in her own right, and one with sharp business instincts.

=== 1920s and 1930s ===
It was also in 1923 that Hardman joined Liverpool's "Sandon Studios Society", an "artists' club": members included many of the city's practicing architects, painters, sculptors and musicians. In 1926, he visited southern France in company with fellow Sandon members, one of them being the architect Harold Hinchcliffe Davies. Three years later he undertook a second visit to France, this time visiting Biarritz, and accompanied by another Sandon member, the architect Fraincis Xavier Velarde. These visits enabled him to build his portfolio of landscape photographs, most notably with his evocative "A Memory of Avignon" and "Martigues". Portfolios of his work were a regular feature in Dublin's The Camera magazine which circulated through Britain and abroad.

In 1926, Hardman appointed seventeen-year-old Margaret Mills as his assistant. At first, she would look after the studio in Hardman's absence when he was in the South of France that year. In 1929, Margaret left the studio to train as a photographer in Paisley, Scotland. Margaret and Hardman kept in touch through frequent affectionate letters. In the same year Kenneth Burrell left the business entirely to Hardman.

In 1930, Hardman was awarded 1st prize in the American Annual of Photography and a gold medal in London for his picture "Martigues" taken whilst in Martigues, France in 1926. The prize included a welcome $100 cash element. While portraiture was Hardman's livelihood, his real photographic interest was landscape photography, which he pursued throughout his life alongside his commercial practice.

The 1930s was a prolific period for Hardman's landscape photography. He recalled later, "Most of my childish dreams were of landscapes; usually of some remote and spectacularly sired lake, which I could never find again."

In 1930, not long after Hardman and Margaret discussed starting a portrait business together, Margaret wrote that she had fallen in love with 'Tony'. Hardman's response was that she was too young and "that kind of love doesn't last". Hardman confessed to a friend that he had ".. been a fool. I should have married her long ago but I had no money". He did not give up, however, sending a message of his love for Margaret, by cable, from Barcelona. In May 1931, Margaret broke off her engagement to Tony.

On 10 August 1932, Hardman married Margaret, he aged 33 and she 23, and they rented a flat at 59 Hope Street, Liverpool. The marriage was a close one but childless. They worked long hours at the studio, but still found time for weekend expeditions, strapping camera equipment onto their bicycles and riding out into the countryside to shoot landscapes. In the same year Hardman won a contract with the Liverpool Playhouse theatre to provide portraits and production shots of actors. These included Ivor Novello, Patricia Routledge, Robert Donat and Hugh Paddick.

Hardman was elected a fellow of the Royal Photographic Society and took many landscape photographs in Scotland, as well as a notable portrait of prima ballerina Margot Fonteyn. Other portrait subjects included Michael Redgrave, Ivor Novello and (the then youthful) John Moores. In 1938, Hardman took over the lease of a second portrait studio based in Chester.

=== War years and 1950s ===
During the war years the business flourished, although because of this Hardman's landscape photography suffered as he had no spare time. During the Second World War there was a black market in films, but Hardman took care not to get involved. His business thrived during the war because of the number of servicemen wanting a family picture to take with them when posted abroad, or a picture of themselves to leave with their family. In 1941 the Hardmans moved to Barnston on the Wirral. There they stayed for seven years, until the Bold Street studio lease expired. The Hardmans then moved to larger premises at 59 Rodney Street, a couple of minute's to the north of the city's (by now almost completed) cathedral. This became their new studio and also their home for the rest of their lives.

In 1950. Hardman took what was to become "the most reproduced photograph illustrating and era of Liverpool's commerce": Birth of the Ark Royal. By 1953, however, it seemed that the business was in uncertain times, and there is evidence of Hardman applying for other jobs including, work at the Bluecoat Society of Arts and at Kodak. It was in 1953 Kenneth Burrell, by now in Ireland died, aged 60. In 1958, Hardman suffered further loss with the death of his own mother: the lease on the Chester studio also ended.

=== Later years ===
In 1965/6, Hardman officially retired, but did continue to work by taking portraits for small commissions and even taking evening classes for the Army. He also continued with some landscape photography, but employed only part-time staff as the fashion for formal photography was in decline. The contents of his house suffered increasing neglect, along with several pipe-bursts, causing chaos in many rooms in the property.

In 1969, Margaret took the photograph of Chambré Hardman behind his Rolleiflex camera, in collar and tie, and trilby hat. Early in 1969 Margaret Hardman died of cancer. Hardman not only lost his wife, but his business partner, photographic companion and a very skilful darkroom printer. Following her death, Hardman himself declined, so much so that he came to the attention of Liverpool's Social Services department. He became a recluse and worked less, but did continue to send exhibition prints to the London Salon.

In March 1975, an exhibition of Hardman's work entitled "Fifty Years of Photography" was displayed at the University of Liverpool. A year later Lancashire Life magazine included an article and profile of Hardman, in which he was described as selling negatives from his collection to Liverpool's local history archive. Liverpool Daily Post had recorded "140,000 negs. from 1925 handed over to Central Library".

By 1979, Hardman made few excursions out of his home and found increasing difficulty in walking and suffering a fall. When Peter Hagerty, director of Liverpool's Open Eye Gallery, visited him he said of the experience:

this frail old man came down the stairs, there were four or five people from social services tidying up; they had gowns on and were filling bin bags with rubbish. I started looking in the bags and saw photographs and negatives and magazines; I was instantly aware that a historical record was being thrown away: he had made no provision for anything. He didn't think about dying. He had money but would not buy a home help. He'd rely on home help and then complain.

Hardman accepted Hagerty's suggestion that he should set up a trust, subsequently deciding to bequeath the bulk of his estate. Exhibitions and articles of Hardman's work continued to be presented throughout the 1980s and he was made an Honorary Fellow of the Royal Photographic Society. Throughout the decade exhibitions of Hardman's work continued, while he suffered long stays in hospital.

On 2 April 1988, Hardman died at Sefton General Hospital, Liverpool, and was cremated on 11 April 1988 at Springwood Crematorium, Liverpool. His house and studio, at 59 Rodney Street, were taken over by the E. Chambré Hardman Trust to conserve his work, which was later transferred to the National Trust.

== Works ==
Photographs by Hardman include:

- A Memory of Avignon, 1923
- The Copse, 1934
- The Birth of the Ark Royal, 1950

In late 2019, the National Trust appointed an archivist and a digitisation conservator to conserve their collection of his prints, negatives and letters, at the Liverpool Records Office. The negatives had been found in 2003 to be "actively deteriorating" smelling of vinegar.
