= Formby Power Station railway station =

Former railway station in England

Formby Power Station
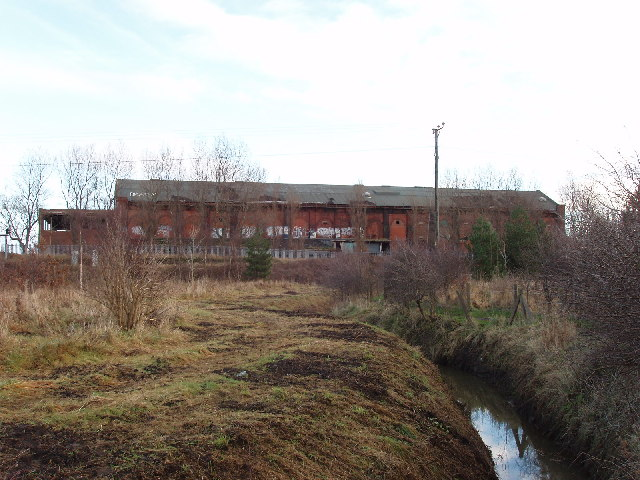
- Derelict railway power station at Altcar, Formby

General information
- Location: Formby, Metropolitan Borough of Sefton; England
- Coordinates: 53.5424°N 3.0661°W
- Grid reference: SD293056

Other information
- Status: Disused

History
- Original company: Lancashire and Yorkshire Railway
- Pre-grouping: Lancashire and Yorkshire Railway
- Post-grouping: London, Midland and Scottish Railway

Key dates
- c.1917: Opened
- c.1943–1944: Closed
Location

Formby Power Station railway station was a railway station on the Liverpool, Crosby and Southport Railway, situated south of Hogshill Lane and just north of the River Alt.

== History ==
The railway station was opened circa 1917 by the Lancashire and Yorkshire Railway (L&YR) as a small halt adjacent to Formby power station. The station did not appear in the public timetables and was only open for use for employees of the power station.

The station was located south of Hogshill Lane and just north of the River Alt.

The power station was L&YR owned and operated, it had opened in 1904 and generated current for the L&YR local electrically powered lines, chiefly between Liverpool, Southport and Ormskirk.

The halt was closed around 1943–1944 and the power station closed down in 1946.

The line through the station remains open and is today used by trains on the Merseyrail Northern Line.

The power station building was later used by Metal Closures Rosslite Limited as a factory producing expanded polystyrene packaging and insulation products, and then as a business centre. The site eventually became derelict but plans were later announced to convert it for residential use.

The power station was demolished in 2016, the whole site was levelled and work started on a new housing development, leaving no trace of the original buildings. Development of the site was completed in August 2016, including a new access road connecting the site with Park Road. The roads on the new development were named after some of the pioneers in the field of electricity: Callan Crescent, Edison Close, Gilbert Close, Tesla Way, and Wheatstone Road.

In February 2017, a gate was installed on Hoggs Hill Lane to prevent vehicular access to the site via the original route.

Preceding station	Historical railways	Following station
Altcar Rifle Range; Until 1921	Lancashire and Yorkshire Railway; Liverpool, Crosby and Southport Railway	Formby
Hightown; Since 1921	Lancashire and Yorkshire Railway; Liverpool, Crosby and Southport Railway	Formby

== Sources ==
- Gell, Rob (1986). An Illustrated Survey of Railway Stations Between Southport & Liverpool 1848-1986. Heyday Publishing Company. ISBN 0-947562-04-4.
- Marshall, John (1970). The Lancashire & Yorkshire Railway. Vol. 2. Newton Abbot: David & Charles. ISBN 978-0-7153-4906-9.
- Quick, Michael (2023) [2001]. Railway passenger stations in Great Britain: a chronology (PDF). version 5.05. Railway & Canal Historical Society.
