= Altcar Rifle Range railway station =

Disused railway station in Hightown, Merseyside

Altcar Rifle Range
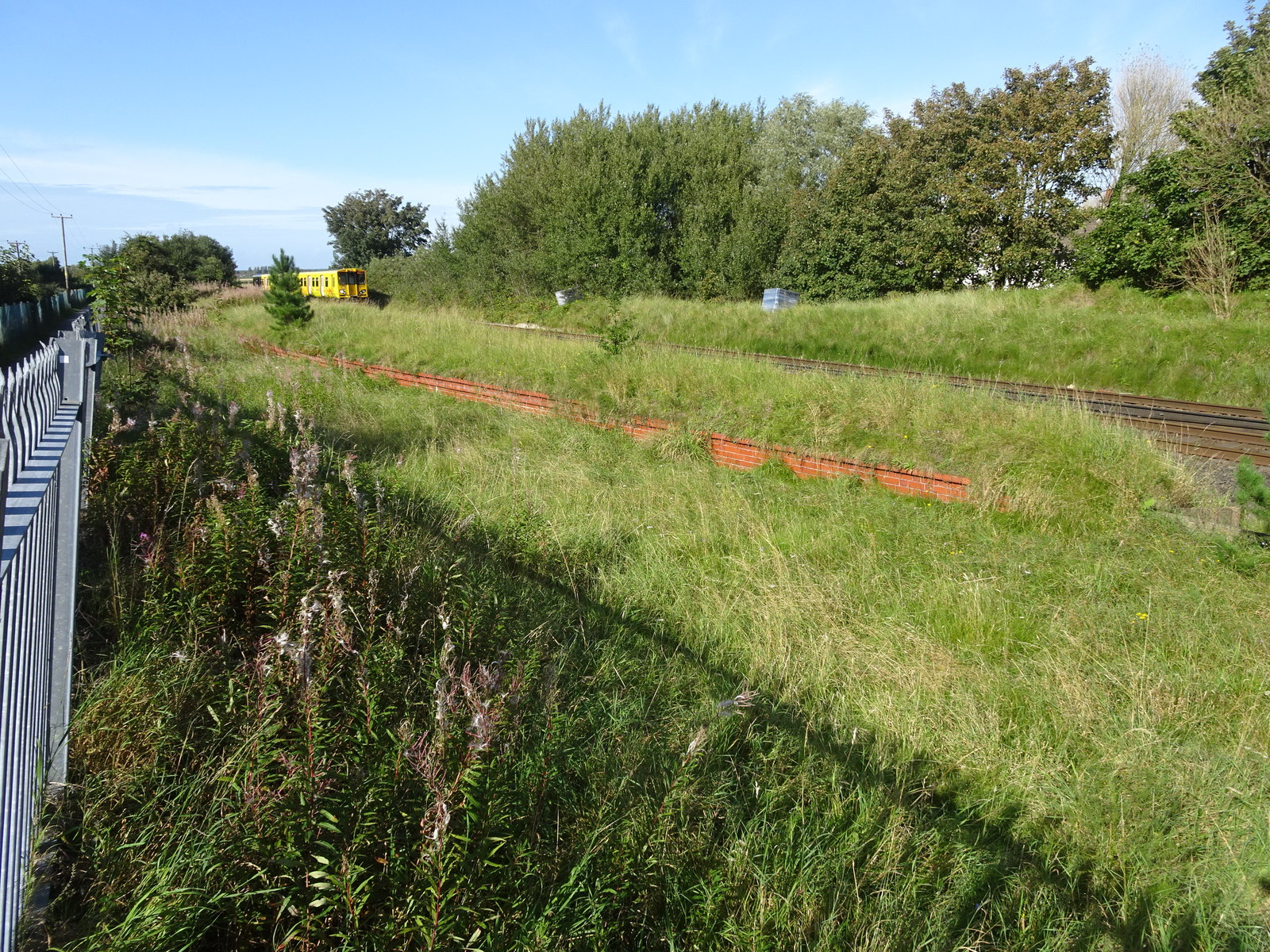
- Station remains in 2020.

General information
- Location: Hightown, Sefton; England
- Coordinates: 53.53056°N 3.05966°W
- Grid position: SD299043
- Line: Liverpool, Crosby and Southport Railway
- Platforms: 3

Other information
- Status: Disused

History
- Original company: Lancashire and Yorkshire Railway

Key dates
- By August 1862: Station opens as Hightown Siding
- 1865: Renamed Hightown New Siding
- 1871: Renamed Hightown Rifle Station
- 1886: Renamed Altcar Rifle station
- 1886: Renamed Altcar Rifle Range
- October 1893: Station closed
- April 1894: Station reopened
- 3 October 1921: Station officially closes
Location

Altcar Rifle Range railway station was a railway station on the Liverpool, Crosby and Southport Railway, situated a third of a mile north of Hightown, Merseyside. The station served the nearby Altcar Rifle Range.

== History ==
The station was opened by August 1862 when it first appeared in Bradshaw's timetable. It was opened by the Lancashire and Yorkshire Railway (L&YR) on the line of the former Liverpool, Crosby and Southport Railway which it had absorbed.

It opened as Hightown Siding, was renamed Hightown New Siding in 1865. In November 1869 it moved from the siding, but stayed on the same site, as the siding was put out of use by a fire. In 1871 it became Hightown Rifle Station, in 1886 Altcar Rifle Station, and finally Altcar Rifle Range also in 1886, although this version did not appear in Bradshaw until 1895.

The station was mainly used to serve Altcar Rifle Range and the service was irregular. The station was mainly used in the summers and sometimes on the weekends in the winters. Towards the end of its life it appears to have only been used "as required", possibly just by troop trains.

The station was closed briefly between October 1893 and April 1894. The line through the station was electrified in 1904.

The station was reported permanently closed on 3 October 1921, but it was still in timetables with a daily service in September 1927 and with just a Saturday service in September 1930. The London, Midland and Scottish Railway's working timetable was still showing the station in 1936 albeit without any trains calling. The station was probably dismantled in 1936, although it is still shown on the OS mapping of 1946.

The station was located at the end of a lane approximately 1/3 mile (0.54 km) north of Hightown, in 1893 there were two platforms, one each side of the double track line, and a bay platform to the north on the seaward side from which a small tramway was used to transport munitions to and from the firing ranges.

By 1908 there were three platform faces as there was a loop on the western side of the station making that platform into an island. The bay platform was still to the north. There were additional sidings and a 5-ton crane had been installed.

== The site today ==
The line through the station remains open and is today used by trains on the Merseyrail Northern Line.

| Preceding station | Historical railways | Following station |
|---|---|---|
| Hightown; Towards Southport | Lancashire and Yorkshire Railway; Liverpool, Crosby and Southport Railway | Formby; Until 1917 |
| Hightown; Towards Southport | Lancashire and Yorkshire Railway; Liverpool, Crosby and Southport Railway | Formby Power Station; From 1917 |

== See also ==
Altcar Rifle Range

== Bibliography ==
- Liverpool to Southport *Gell, Rob (1986). An Illustrated Survey of Railway Stations Between Southport & Liverpool 1848-1986. Heyday Publishing Company. ISBN 0-947562-04-4. (No page numbers.)
- Quick, Michael (2023) [2001]. Railway passenger stations in Great Britain: a chronology (PDF). version 5.05. Railway & Canal Historical Society.
- The Railway Clearing House (1970) [1904]. The Railway Clearing House Handbook of Railway Stations 1904 (1970 D&C Reprint ed.). Newton Abbot: David & Charles Reprints. ISBN 0-7153-5120-6.
