= Blundellsands & Crosby railway station =

Railway station in Merseyside, England

Blundellsands & Crosby
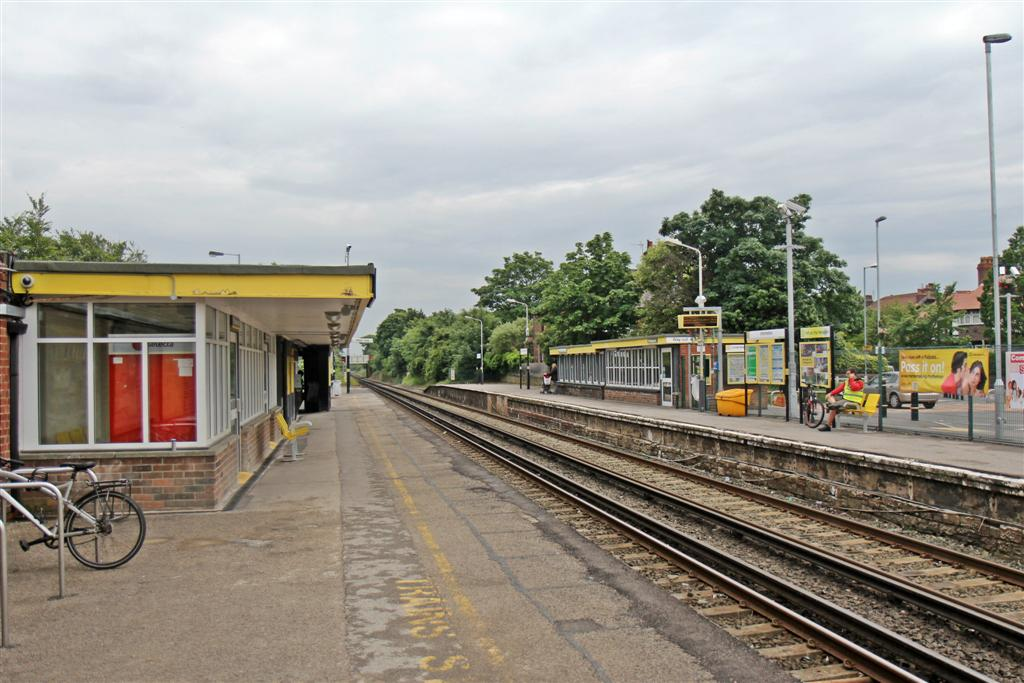

General information
- Location: Blundellsands, Sefton; England
- Coordinates: 53.4877°N 3.0404°W
- Grid reference: SJ310994
- Manager: Merseyrail
- Transit authority: Merseytravel
- Platforms: 2

Other information
- Station code: BLN
- Fare zone: C3
- Classification: DfT category E

History
- Original company: Liverpool, Crosby and Southport Railway
- Pre-grouping: Lancashire and Yorkshire Railway
- Post-grouping: London, Midland and Scottish Railway

Key dates
- 24 July 1848: Opened as Crosby
- 1 June 1852: Station relocated
- 1865: Station relocated and renamed Blundellsands for Crosby
- November 1865: Renamed Blundellsands & Crosby
- 1882: Station rebuilt
- 6 January 1964: Closed to goods

Passengers
- 2021/22: ▲1.197 million
- 2022/23: ▲1.365 million
- 2023/24: ▲1.498 million
- 2024/25: ▲1.564 million
- 2025/26: ▲1.770 million
Location
Notes
- Passenger statistics from the Office of Rail and Road

Blundellsands & Crosby railway station is a railway station in the Blundellsands area of Merseyside, England. It also serves the adjacent town of Crosby. It is situated on the Northern Line of the Merseyrail network.

== History ==
Blundellsands & Crosby railway station opened on 24 July 1848 as Crosby when the Liverpool, Crosby and Southport Railway (LC&SR) opened its line from Waterloo to Southport Eastbank Street.

The station was situated on the north side of Warren House lane (which became Mersey Road) which was crossed using a level crossing,

In 1852, the station was moved 250 yd (230 m) north to the south side of the newly built Blundellsands Road which was also crossed via a level crossing. This station was constructed from some of the materials from the recently closed Southport Eastbank Street opening on 1 June.

In 1850, the LC&SR had been authorised to lease, sell or transfer itself to the L&YR and on 14 June 1855 the L&YR purchased and took over the LC&SR.

The station was relocated again in 1865 to the north side of Blundellsands Road when it was renamed Blundellsands for Crosby, in November 1865 it was renamed Blundellsands & Crosby. (Note: Bradshaw's guides and timetables called the station Crosby & Blundellsands from December 1865 until 1877/1878 when they changed to Blundellsands & Crosby, see for example the 1866 version.)

The station was extensively rebuilt in 1882. There were two platforms with substantial awnings. The down side buildings were of brick and stone construction whilst the up side were wooden. (Note: Up trains usually headed towards the major conurbation, usually London, some railway companies ran 'up' to their headquarters location. In this case 'up' was towards Liverpool.)

There was a goods and coal yard situated behind the down platform, it was equipped with a four ton crane. and there were additional sidings on the up side of the line.

The Lancashire and Yorkshire Railway amalgamated with the London and North Western Railway on 1 January 1922 and in turn was Grouped into the London, Midland and Scottish Railway in 1923. Nationalisation followed in 1948.

The goods yard closed on 6 January 1964.

In 1978 the station became part of the Merseyrail network's Northern Line (operated by British Rail until privatised in 1995).

== Facilities ==
The station underwent a revamp at a cost of £250,000 in 2009, including the installation of electronic timetables, in July that year. The refurbishment included a new toilet with disabled access, changes to the waiting rooms such as automatic doors, CCTV, new flooring, seats, new windows and heating. In 2010 a new 101-space car park was constructed on the site of the previous one, including new surfacing, marked bays, lighting and landscaping. There is also cycle racks for 30 cycles and secure cycle storage for 74 cycles.

== Services ==
Trains operate every 15 minutes throughout the day from Monday to Saturday - they travel to Southport in the north and to Liverpool Central in the south. Sunday services travel every 30 minutes in each direction.

Preceding station	National Rail	Following station
Hall Road towards Southport	Merseyrail; Southport branch Northern Line	Waterloo towards Liverpool Central
	Historical railways	
Hightown towards Southport	Lancashire and Yorkshire Railway; Liverpool, Crosby and Southport Railway	Waterloo towards Liverpool Exchange

== Gallery ==
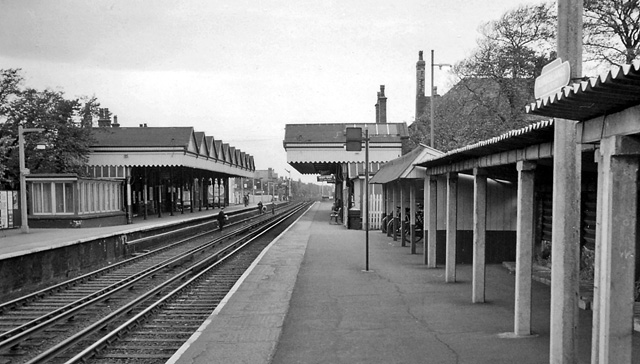
The view towards Southport, in 1962.

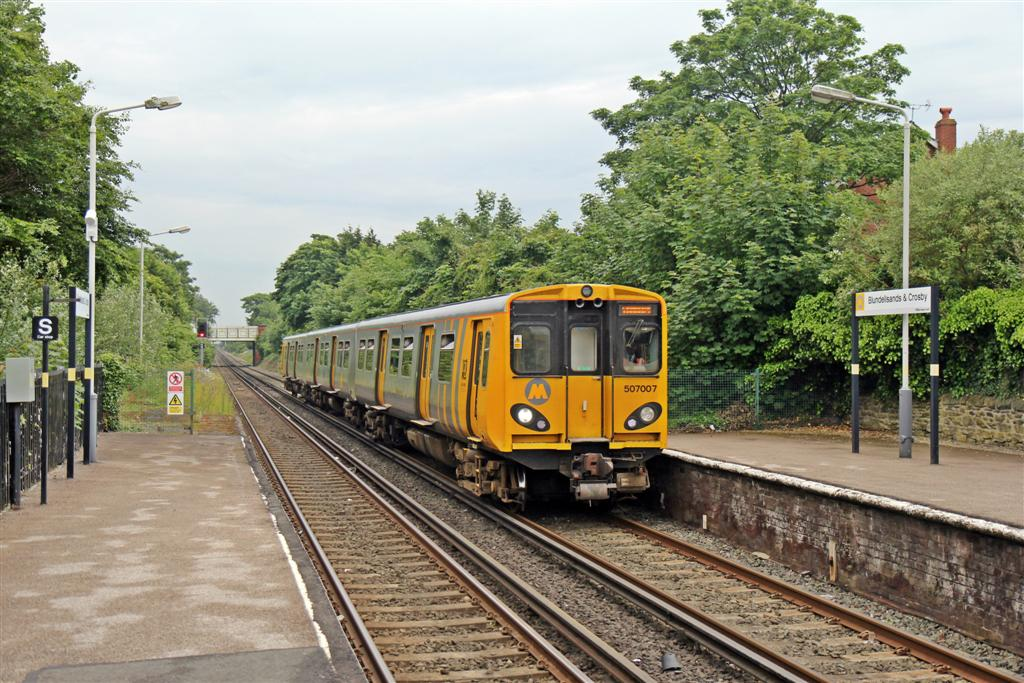
A Merseyrail Class 507 arrives with a service from Liverpool.

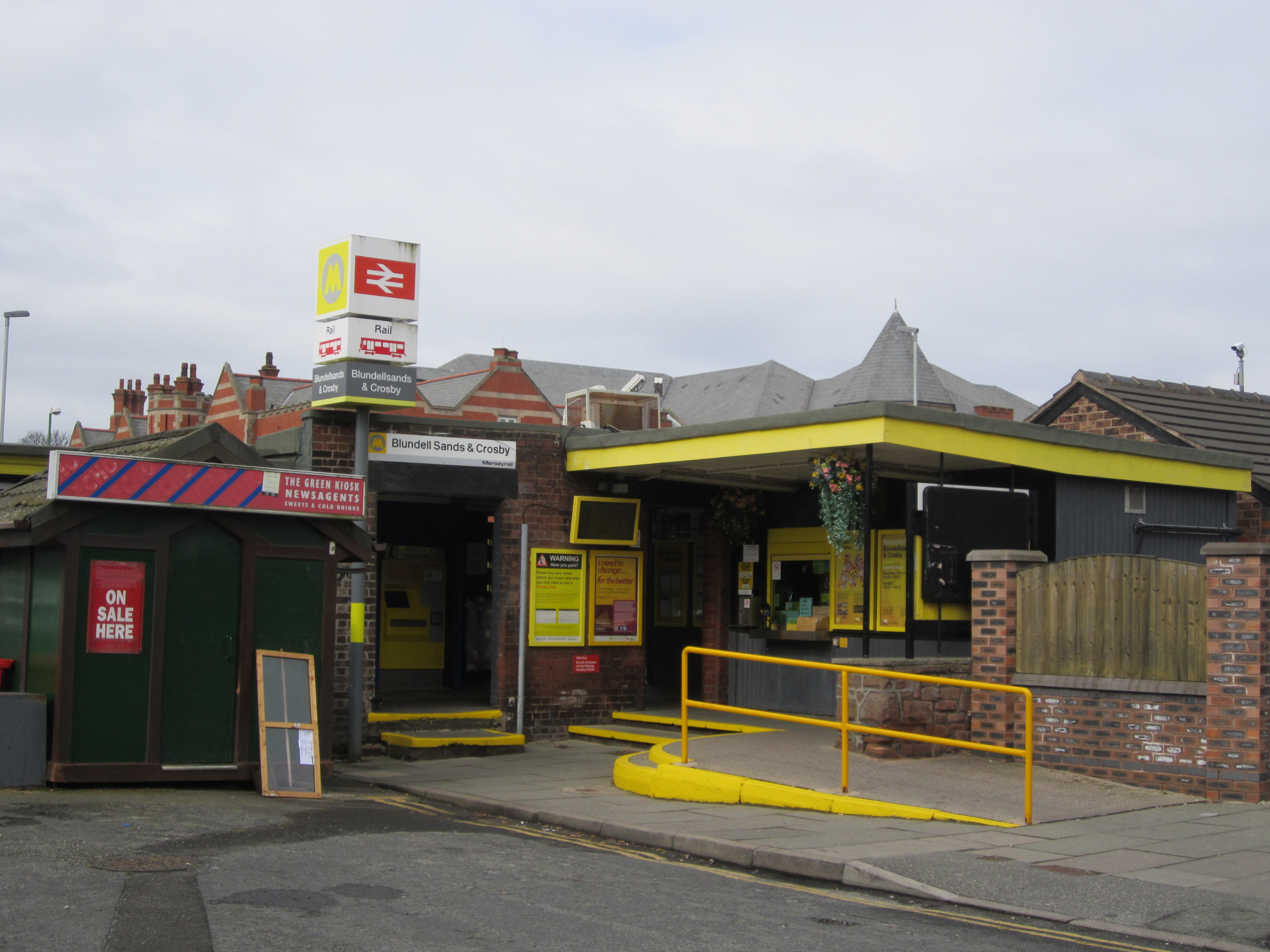
The station entrance, from the roadside.

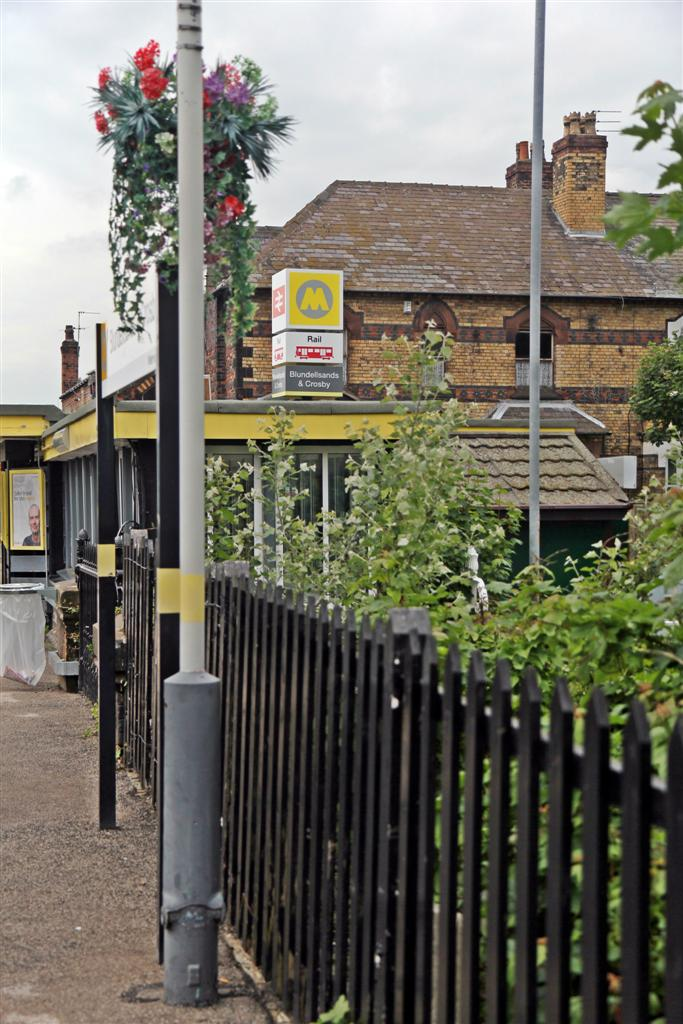
Platform decoration at the station.
