= FBY =

FBY could refer to:

- Fairbury Municipal Airport, airport in Fairbury, Nebraska, U.S.
- Formby railway station, train station in Formby, England, UK
- WFBY, radio station in Buckhannon, West Virginia, U.S.
