= Birkdale railway station =

Railway station in Southport, England

Birkdale
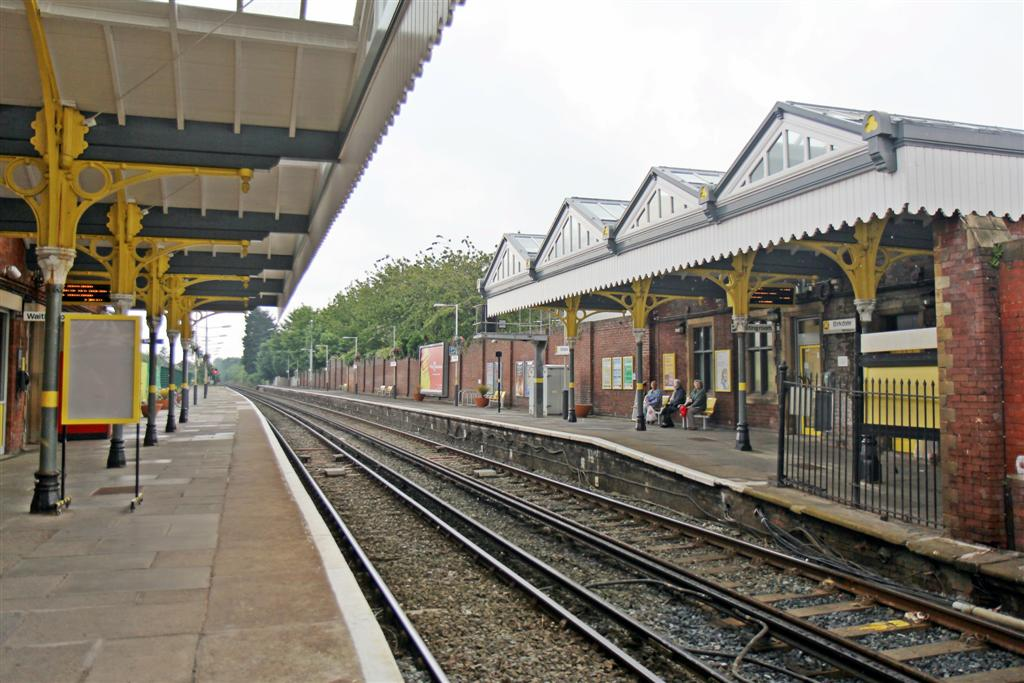

General information
- Location: Birkdale, Sefton; England
- Coordinates: 53.6340°N 3.0145°W
- Grid reference: SD330157
- Manager: Merseyrail
- Transit authority: Merseytravel
- Platforms: 2

Other information
- Station code: BDL
- Fare zone: D1
- Classification: DfT category E

History
- Original company: Liverpool, Crosby and Southport Railway
- Pre-grouping: Lancashire and Yorkshire Railway
- Post-grouping: London, Midland and Scottish Railway

Key dates
- 31 July 1848: Opened as Gilbert's Crossing
- By December 1848: Relocated
- 1852: Replaced on present site
- 1854: Renamed Birkdale Park
- 1865: Renamed Birkdale
- 28 November 1966: Closed for goods

Passengers
- 2021/22: ▲0.852 million
- 2022/23: ▲0.975 million
- 2023/24: ▲1.027 million
- 2024/25: ▲1.065 million
- 2025/26: ▲1.118 million
Location
Notes
- Passenger statistics from the Office of Rail and Road

Birkdale railway station serves the Birkdale suburb of Southport, England. The station is on the Southport branch of the Merseyrail network's Northern line.

== History ==
A station called Gilbert's Crossing opened on 24 July 1848, when the Liverpool, Crosby and Southport Railway (LC&SR) opened its single-track line from Waterloo to Southport Eastbank Street.

The location of the first station is unknown but it is likely it was at the road crossing the line north of "Old Gilbert's". It was not open for long, and by December 1848 had moved to where the road crossed the line at "Old Gilbert's", the OS map of 1847 showing the station between "Old Gilbert's Birkdale" and "Bond's House", approximately opposite the current Dunkirk Road. (Note: Little is known of these early stations, they are not mentioned in any of the newspaper announcements on the opening of the line, nor in the early timetables, see for example Bradshaw (1850). The timetable shown in a local newspaper in 1850 shows the station, named "Birkdale" but with no trains stopping there. It may be that the company were referring to Birkdale station at Gilbert's Crossing.)

The line was subsequently extended to Liverpool Exchange in 1850 and Southport Chapel Street in 1851. The track was doubled by September 1852.

This station opened sometime in 1851 or 1852. (Note: Foster (1995) states the station moved in 1851. Quick (2023) notes that the LC&SR issued orders on 3 August 1852 to open ‘forthwith’ the new station at Birkdale. There was also a March 1852 newspaper item saying the new Birkdale station is nearly completed.) The station was renamed Birkdale Park in 1854 to better reflect the area it served, and reverted to Birkdale in 1865.

The station, described as "substantial and ornate" is on the south side of Weld Road / Liverpool Road where the road crosses the railway via a level crossing. (Note: The railway appears to be place where Weld Road becomes Liverpool Road) In 1890 there were booking offices and waiting rooms on both sides of the line, with gabled glazed canopies supported by iron columns, which once ran almost the full length of the platforms; sometime after 1954 they were shortened to six bays on the down platform and four bays on the up side, giving it the character of a small country town station rather than a suburban one. The two platforms were connected by a subway adjacent to the road. (Note: Up trains usually headed towards the major conurbation, usually London, some railway companies ran 'up' to their headquarters location. In this case 'up' was towards Liverpool.)

The signal box adjacent to the station, in use between 1905 and 1994, is a Grade II listed building. There was a goods yard to the north of the level crossing behind the signal box equipped with a one-and-a-half ton crane, and there was an additional siding behind the Liverpool side platform.

The 1851/1852 station building had a tablet inscribed "Birkdale Station"; it was demolished in 1968. (Note: Harrop has the demolition date as 1966.) The goods yard closed on 28 November 1966.

The Lancashire and Yorkshire Railway amalgamated with the London and North Western Railway on 1 January 1922 and in turn was grouped into the London, Midland and Scottish Railway in 1923. Nationalisation followed in 1948.

In 1978 the station became part of the Merseyrail network's Northern line (operated by British Rail until privatised in 1995).

== Facilities ==
The station is staffed during all opening hours, and has platform CCTV. There is a booking office and live departure and arrival screens, for passenger information. There is parking for 90 cars, secure cycle storage for 24 cycles and racks for a further 26 cycles. A subway links the platforms but both platforms can be accessed without steps via the level crossing.

== Services ==
Trains operate every 15 minutes throughout the day from Monday to Saturday to Southport to the north, and to Liverpool Central to the south. Sunday services are every 30 minutes in each direction.

Preceding station	National Rail	Following station
Southport	Merseyrail; Northern Line	Hillside towards Liverpool Central
	Historical railways	
Southport	Lancashire and Yorkshire Railway; Liverpool, Crosby and Southport Railway	Ainsdale towards Liverpool Exchange

== Gallery ==
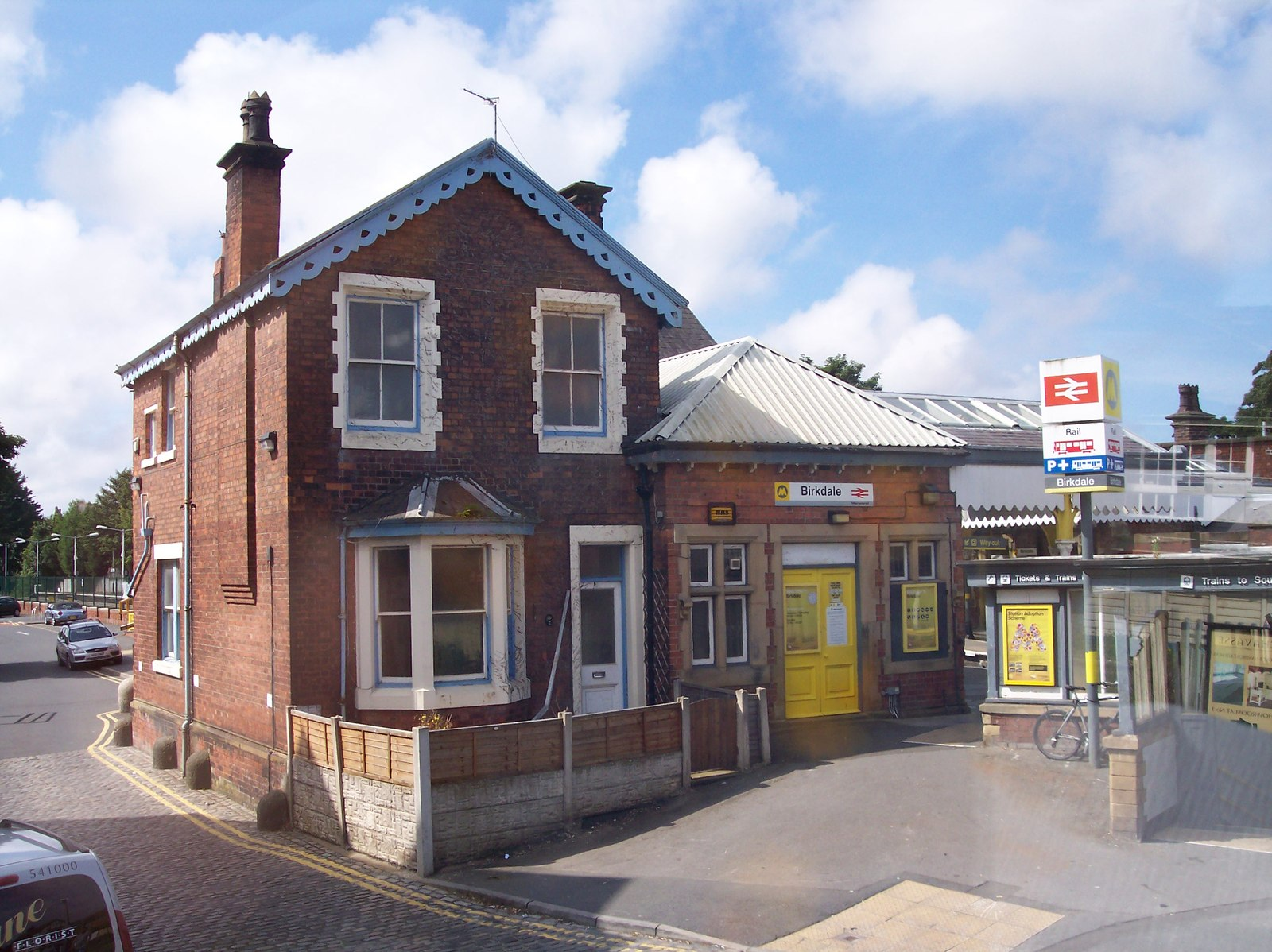
Birkdale railway station from Liverpool Road, 2012

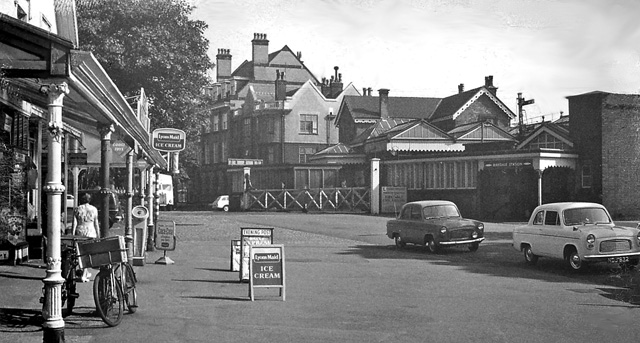
Birkdale Station entrance on Liverpool Road, 1964

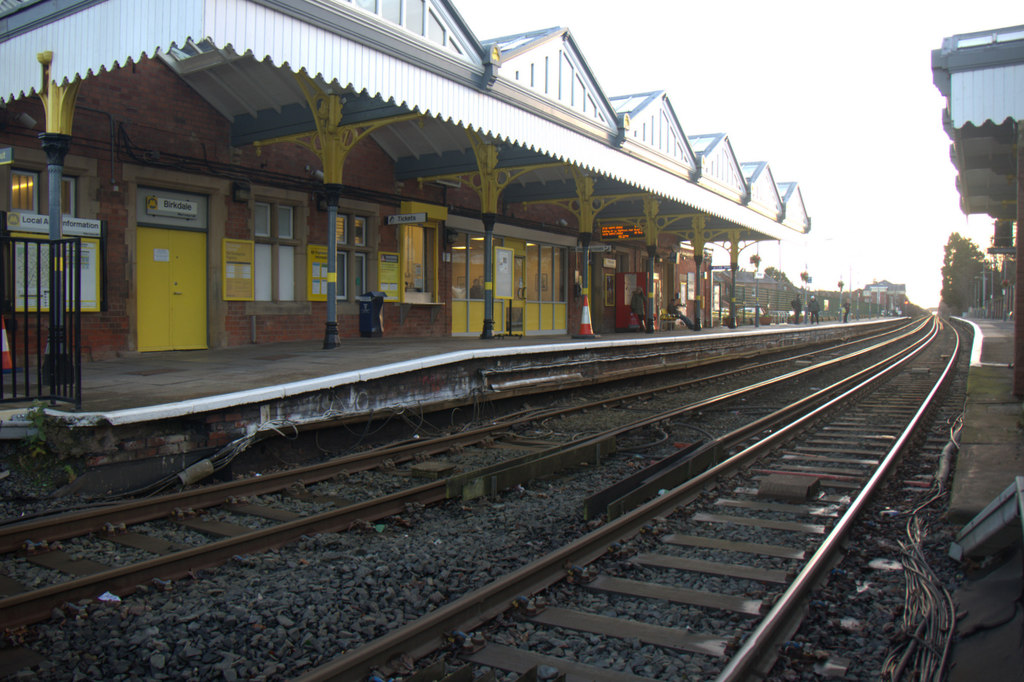
Birkdale Station, 2013

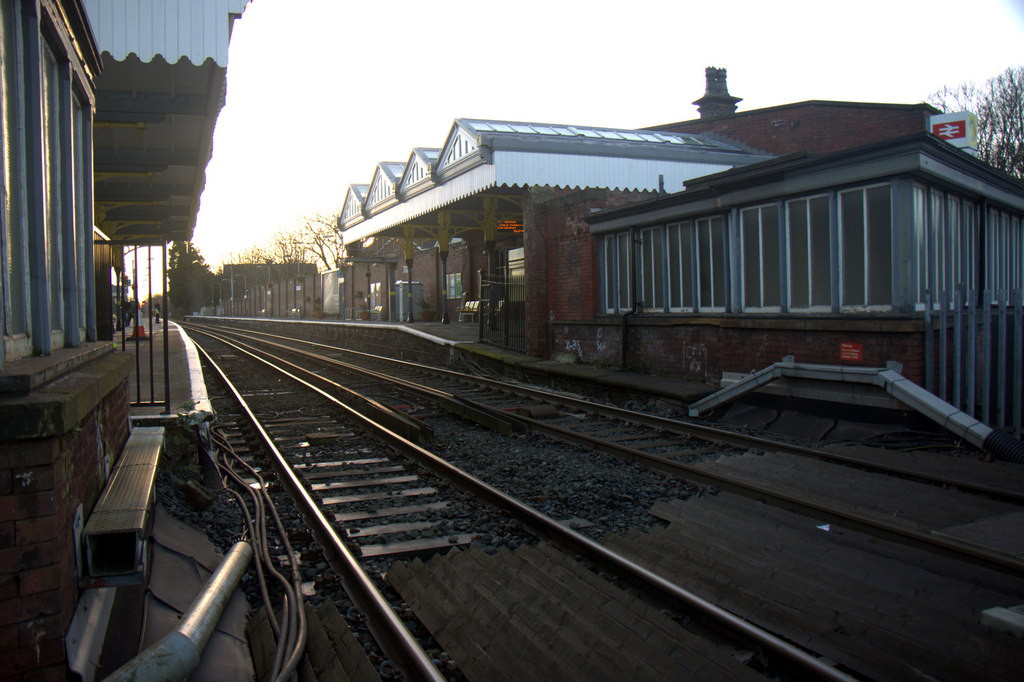
Birkdale Station, 2013
