= LCSR =

LCSR may refer to:

- JHU LCSR: Laboratory for Computational Sensing and Robotics at Johns Hopkins University
- The Laboratory for Computer Science Research at Rutgers University
- Liverpool, Crosby and Southport Railway
- Landing Craft, Swimmer Reconnaissance
- Larger Caliber, Soft Recoil
