= Altcar Training Camp =

Rifle range in Merseyside, England

- Hightown, Merseyside
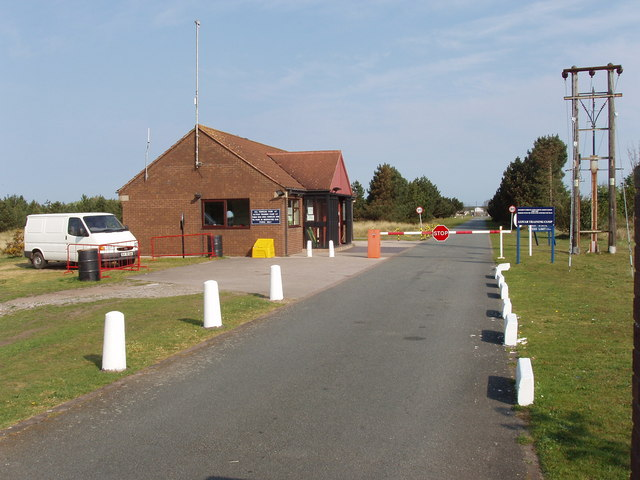
- Altcar Training Camp

Site information
- Type: Barracks
- Owner: Ministry of Defence
- Operator: British Army

Location
- Location within Merseyside
- Coordinates: 53.52859°N 03.05912°W

Site history
- Built: 1860
- Built for: War Office
- In use: 1860-Present

Garrison information
- Current commander: Major (Retired) Carl Gardner
- Occupants: North West Reserve Forces & Cadets Association

Altcar Training Camp is located in Hightown, Merseyside, England. The 620-acre (250 ha) estate is composed of beaches, marshland, fields and small woods. The range is run by the North West Reserve Forces & Cadets Association.

== History ==
William Molyneux, 4th Earl of Sefton first made the site available for the Grand Lancashire Rifle Contest on 29 October 1860. He donated the land to the Volunteer Forces two years later. A railway station was established near the site in 1862 but closed in 1921. The site, which had been known as Altcar Rifle Range, was renamed Altcar Training Camp in 1970. In February 2016 a pavilion was burnt to the ground in a controlled fire to make way for new facilities.

== Gallery ==
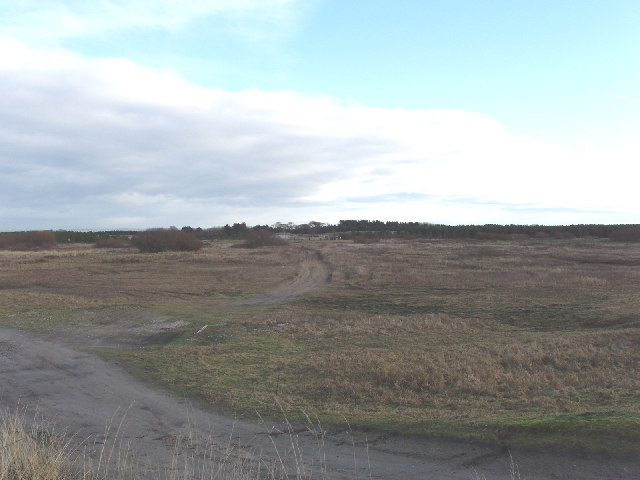
Altcar Rifle Range

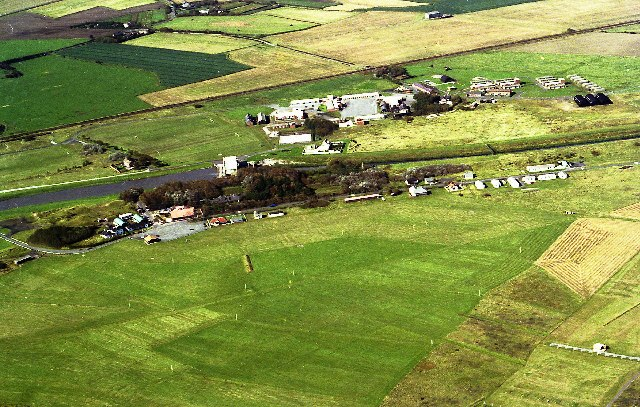
Altcar camp 1981

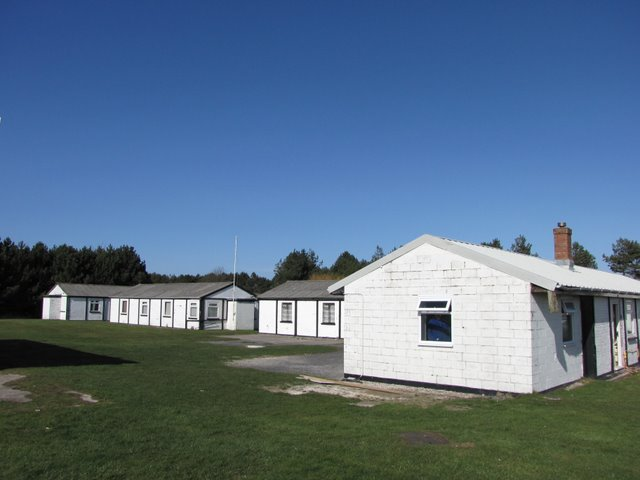
Little Altcar; the Club Huts

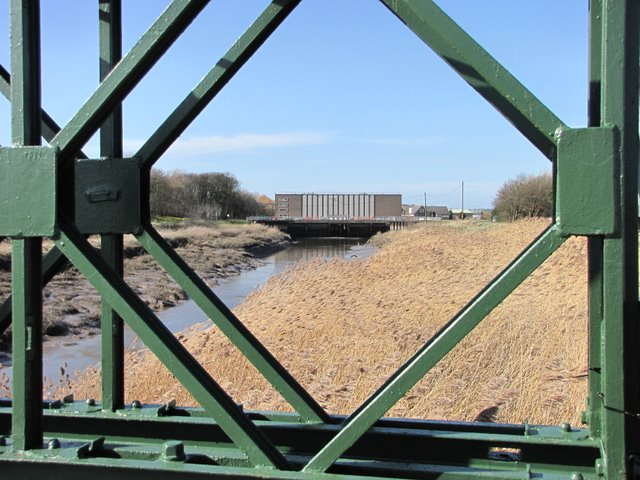
Alt Pumping Station

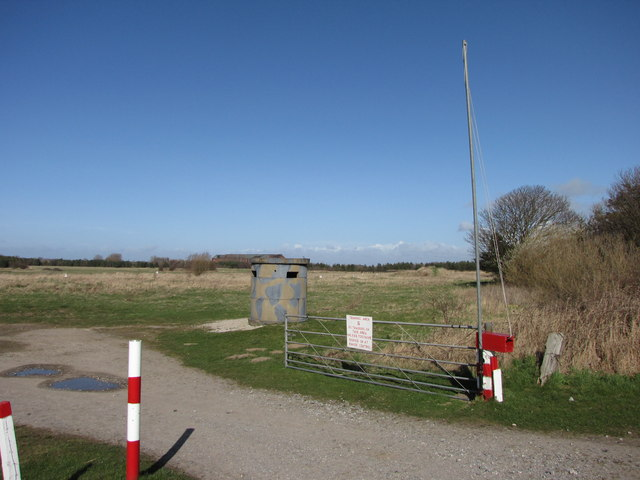
Entrance to "Training Area 6"

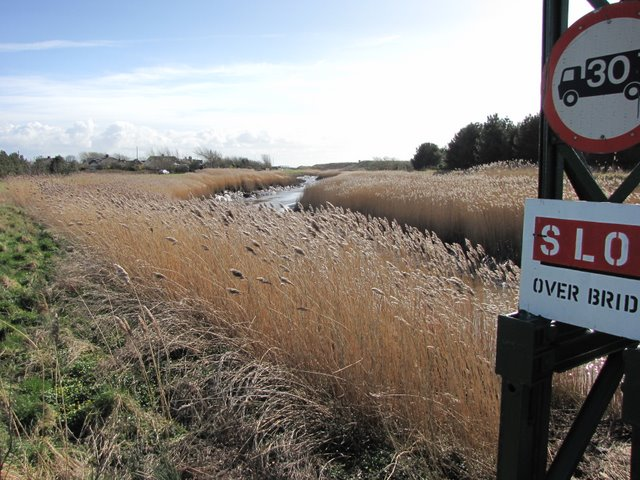
Phragmites

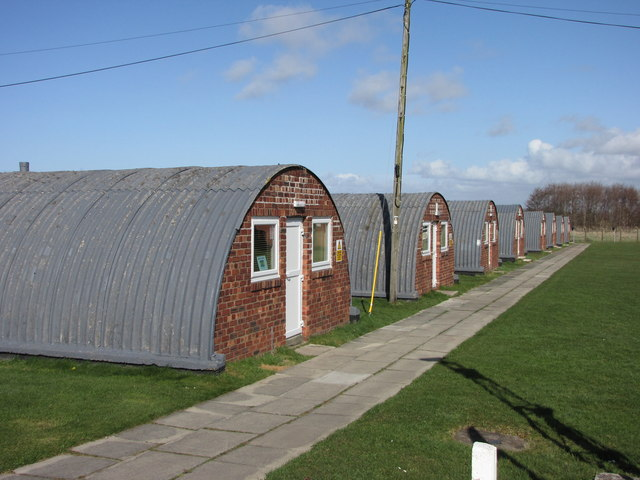
Nissen huts

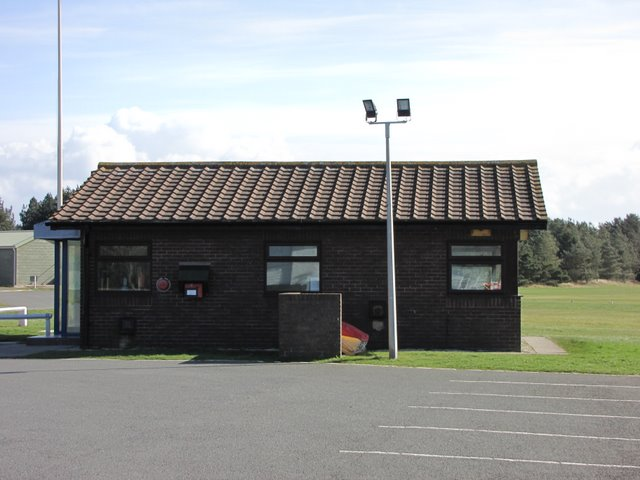
Range Control

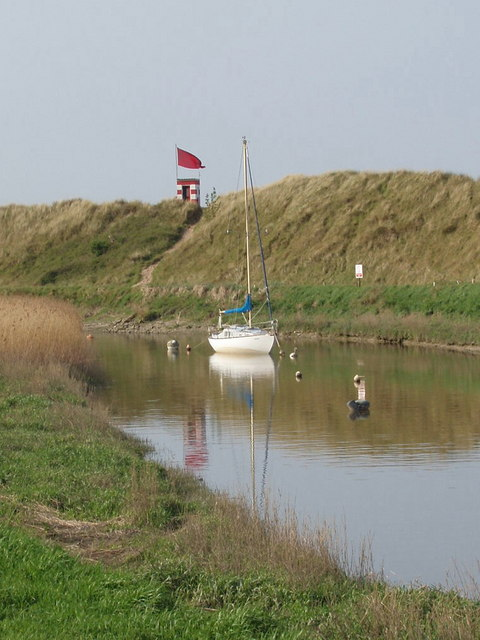
Range danger flag at Alt Estuary
