= Bank Hall railway station =

Railway station in Liverpool, England

Bank Hall
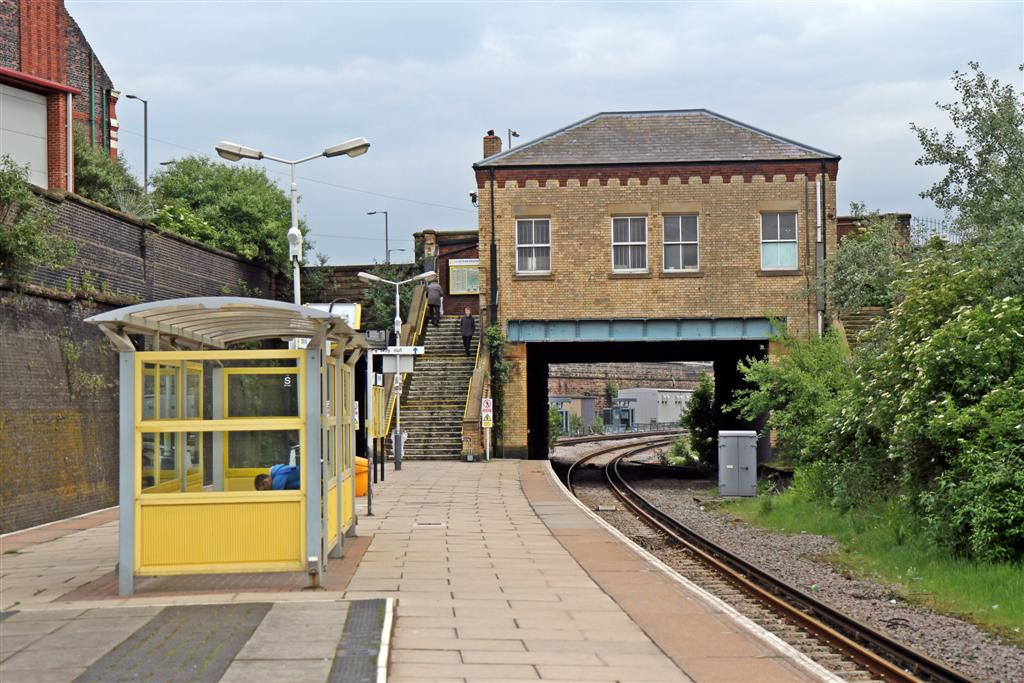
- The booking office and platforms.

General information
- Location: Kirkdale, Liverpool; England
- Coordinates: 53.4376°N 2.9875°W
- Grid reference: SJ344939
- Manager: Merseyrail
- Transit authority: Merseytravel
- Platforms: 2

Other information
- Station code: BAH
- Fare zone: C1
- Classification: DfT category E

Key dates
- 1850: Opened

Passengers
- 2021/22: ▲0.185 million
- 2022/23: ▲0.211 million
- 2023/24: ▲0.214 million
- 2024/25: ▲0.226 million
- 2025/26: ▲0.229 million
Location
Notes
- Passenger statistics from the Office of Rail and Road

Bank Hall railway station is a railway station in Kirkdale, Liverpool, England, located to the north of the city centre, on the Northern Line of the Merseyrail network. As the area around the station is made up of largely closed industrial buildings, the station is one of the quietest on the Northern Line.

== History ==
Bank Hall opened in 1850 as an intermediate station when the Liverpool, Crosby and Southport Railway was extended from its previous terminal at Waterloo to Liverpool Exchange. It became part of the Lancashire and Yorkshire Railway (LYR), on 14 June 1855. The Lancashire and Yorkshire Railway amalgamated with the London and North Western Railway on 1 January 1922 and in turn was Grouped into the London, Midland and Scottish Railway in 1923. Nationalisation followed in 1948 and in 1978 the station became part of the Merseyrail network's Northern Line (operated by British Rail until privatisation in 1995). Only one of the two island platforms located here is still in use - the other remains but has no track and is heavily overgrown.

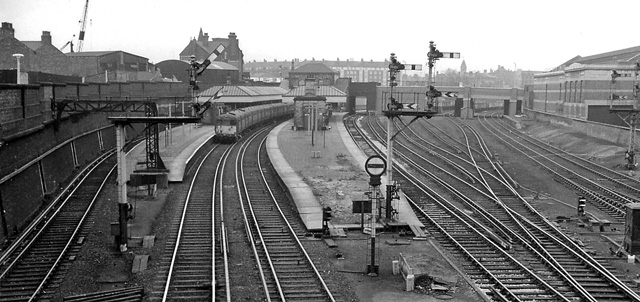
The station in 1962

== Facilities ==
The station's ticket office is staffed during the hours the station is open (from 05:45 on weekdays, 08:00 Sundays until end of service shortly after midnight). There is a shelter on the platform and digital display screens, but no step-free access from the booking hall down to the platform.

== Services ==
Trains operate every 15 minutes throughout the day from Monday to Saturday to Southport to the north, and to Liverpool Central to the south. Sunday services are every 30 minutes in each direction.

== Gallery ==
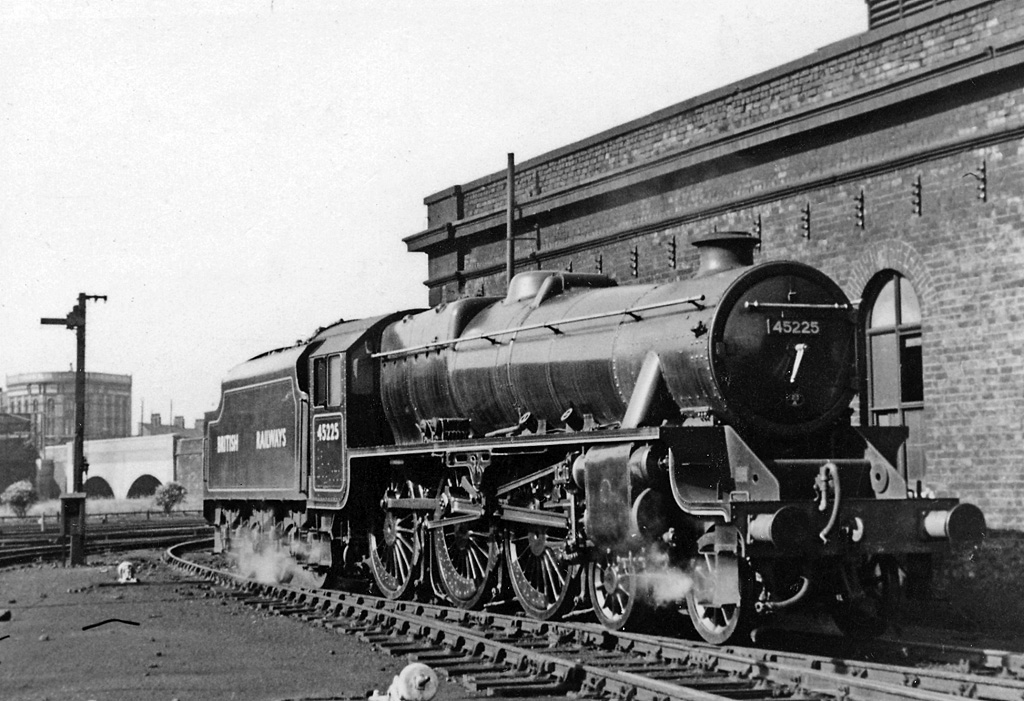
A resplendent Stanier Class 5 at Bank Hall Shed in 1948.

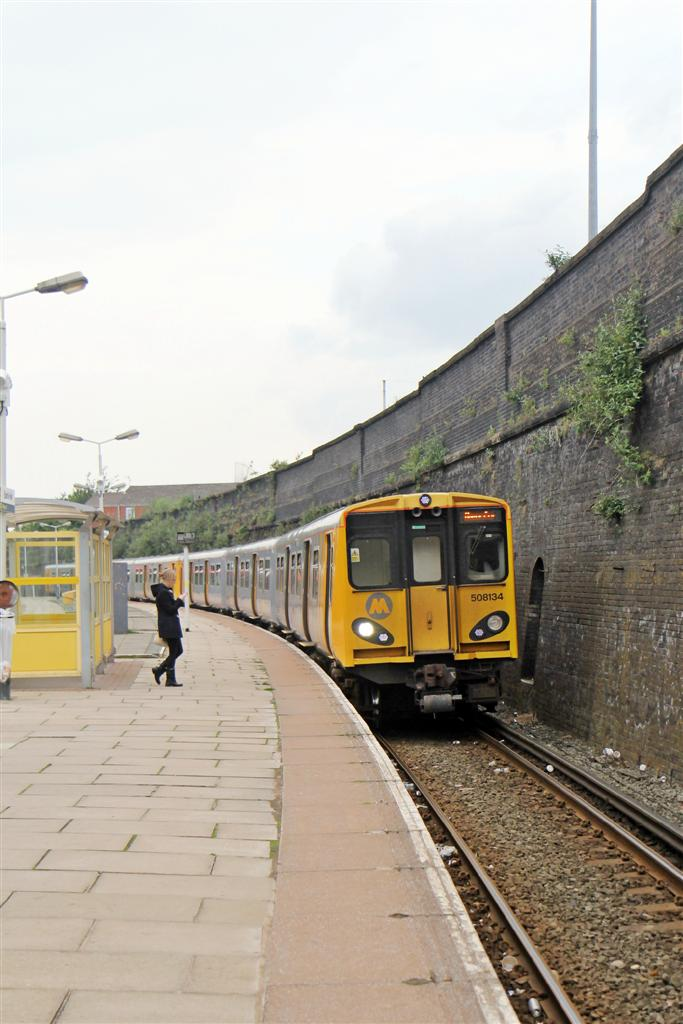
A Class 508 arrives with a service into Liverpool.

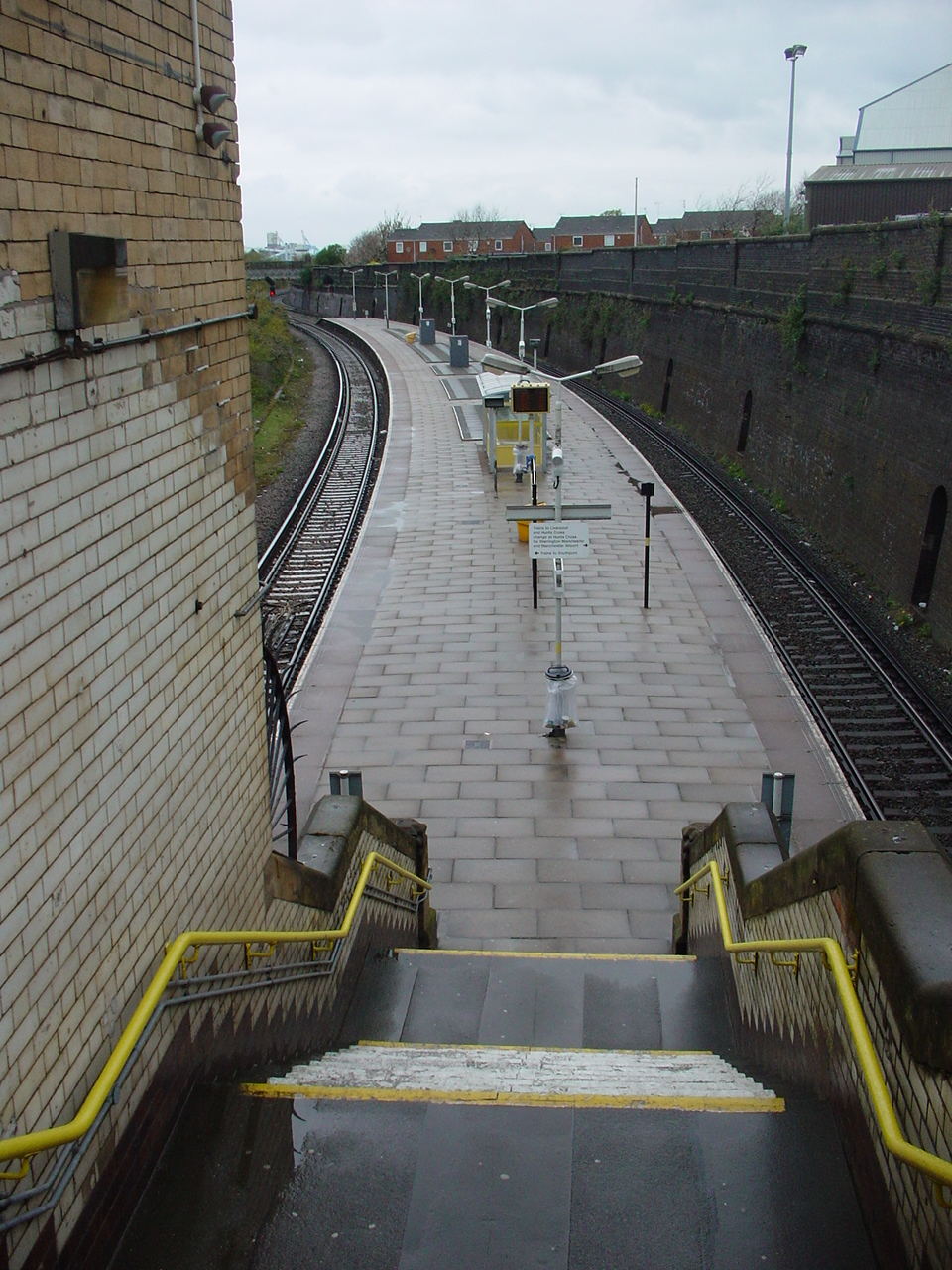
A view from the steps.

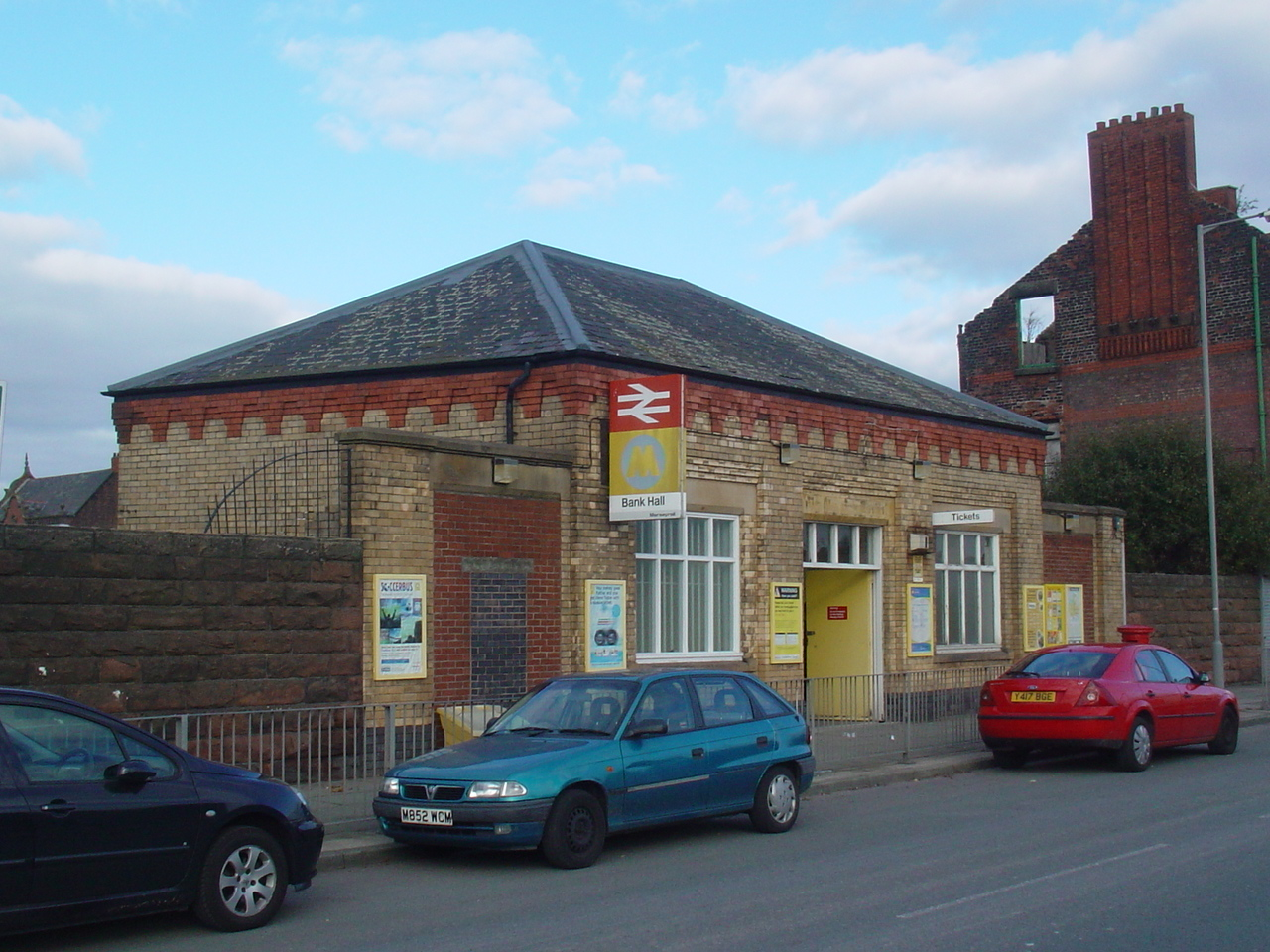
A view of the station, from the street.

Preceding station	National Rail	Following station
Bootle Oriel Road towards Southport	Merseyrail; Northern Line	Sandhills towards Liverpool Central
