= Hightown railway station =

Railway station in Merseyside, England

Hightown
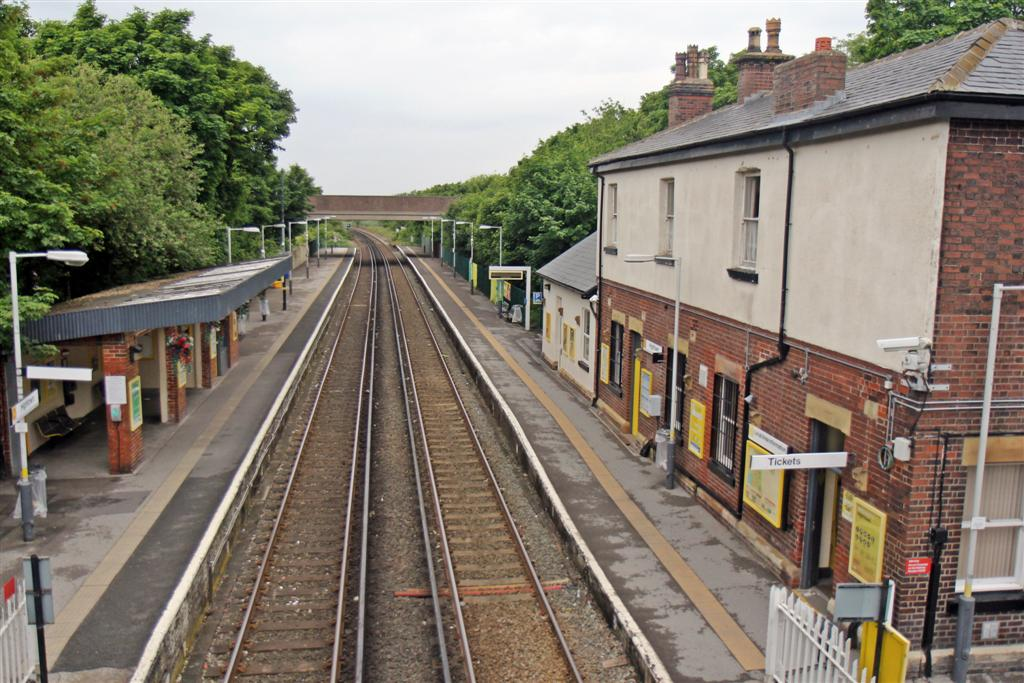

General information
- Location: Hightown, Metropolitan Borough of Sefton; England
- Coordinates: 53.525°N 3.057°W
- Grid reference: SD300036
- Manager: Merseyrail
- Transit authority: Merseytravel
- Platforms: 2

Other information
- Station code: HTO
- Fare zone: D2
- Classification: DfT category E

History
- Original company: Liverpool, Crosby and Southport Railway
- Pre-grouping: Lancashire and Yorkshire Railway
- Post-grouping: London, Midland and Scottish Railway

Key dates
- 24 July 1848: Opened as Hightown
- by 1852: Renamed Hightown & Ince
- 1861: Renamed Hightown
- 7 September 1964: Closed for goods

Passengers
- 2021/22: ▲0.248 million
- 2022/23: ▲0.267 million
- 2023/24: ▲0.291 million
- 2024/25: ▲0.297 million
- 2025/26: ▲0.396 million
Location
Notes
- Passenger statistics from the Office of Rail and Road

Hightown railway station serves the village of Hightown in Merseyside, England. The station is located on the Southport branch of the Merseyrail network's Northern Line.

== History ==
Hightown railway station opened as Hightown on 24 July 1848 when the Liverpool, Crosby and Southport Railway (LC&SR) opened its line from Waterloo to Southport Eastbank Street.

The station was situated on the north side of Alt Road which was crossed using a level crossing.

The station had two platforms, one each side of the double-track with brick and stonework buildings, both sides had glazed awnings and waiting facilities.

There were goods facilities with a siding on the down side and a small goods and coal yard on the up to the south of the level crossing. (Note: Up trains usually headed towards the major conurbation, usually London, some railway companies ran 'up' to their headquarters location. In this case 'up' was towards Liverpool.)

By 1852 the station had been renamed Hightown & Ince and in 1861 it reverted to Hightown.

The Lancashire and Yorkshire Railway amalgamated with the London and North Western Railway on 1 January 1922 and in turn was Grouped into the London, Midland and Scottish Railway in 1923. Nationalisation followed in 1948.

The goods facilities closed on 7 September 1964.

The level crossing was closed by British Rail in March 1967 when a road bridge was constructed nearby. The footbridge was replaced in 1972 with a pre-fabricated ramp and stair footbridge more suitable to the needs of mothers with children and the elderly.

In 1978 the station became part of the Merseyrail network's Northern Line (operated by British Rail until privatised in 1995).

== Facilities ==
The station is staffed, from 15 minutes before the first train until 15 minutes after the last train.

Platform 1 (Southbound) has a waiting room, ticket office, cycle storage and a photo booth, whilst Platform 2 (Northbound) has a shelter, a payphone and cycle storage. There are live dot-matrix departure screens, for passenger information and platform CCTV on both platforms. The platforms are linked via a stepped bridge but both may be accessed via road.

== Services ==
Northbound trains operate to Southport, and Southbound trains to Liverpool Central.

On Mondays to Saturdays there are four trains an hour throughout the day in each direction; on Sundays there are two per hour.

Preceding station	National Rail	Following station
Formby towards Southport	Merseyrail; Hunts Cross - Southport Line	Hall Road towards Liverpool Central
	Historical railways	
Formby towards Southport	Lancashire and Yorkshire Railway; Liverpool, Crosby and Southport Railway	Blundellsands & Crosby (until 1874); Hall Road (since 1874) towards Liverpool Exchange

== Gallery ==
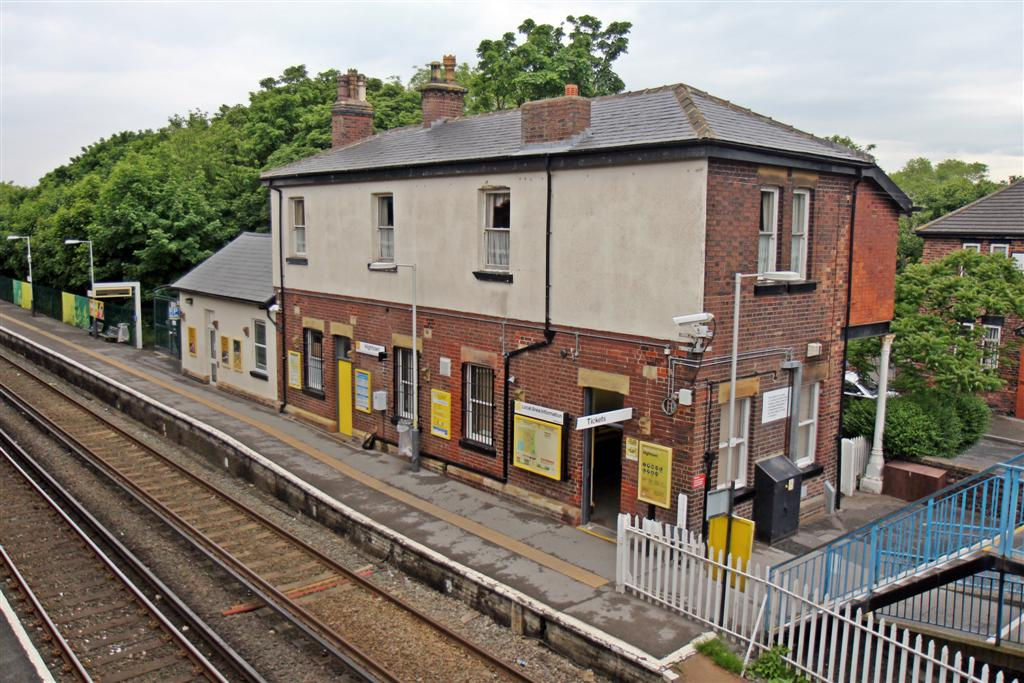
The station booking office.

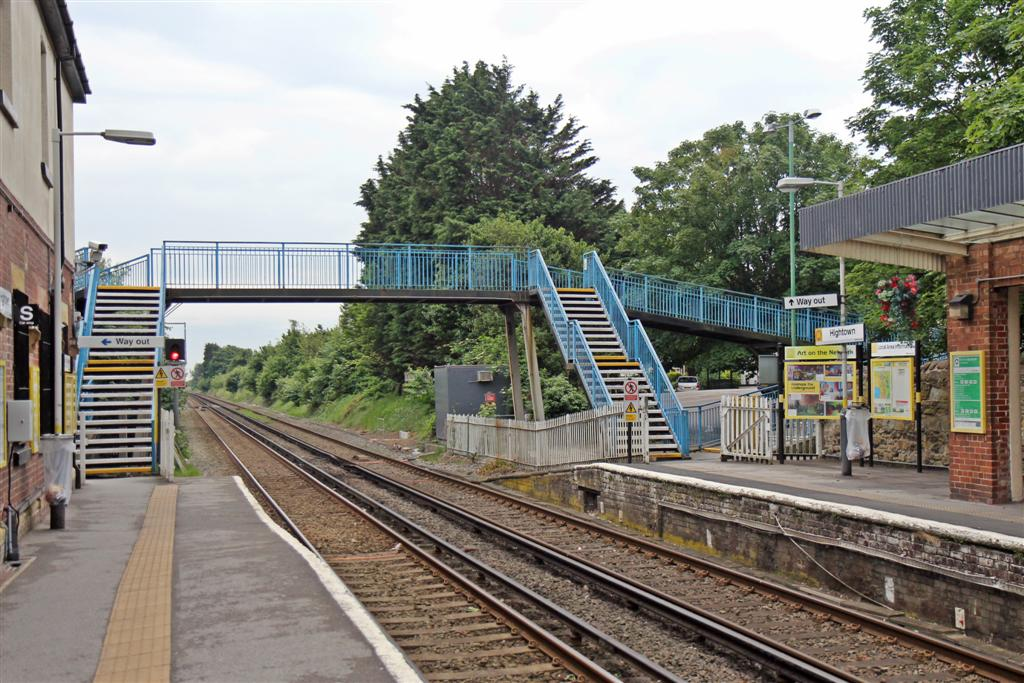
The Alt Road footbridge.

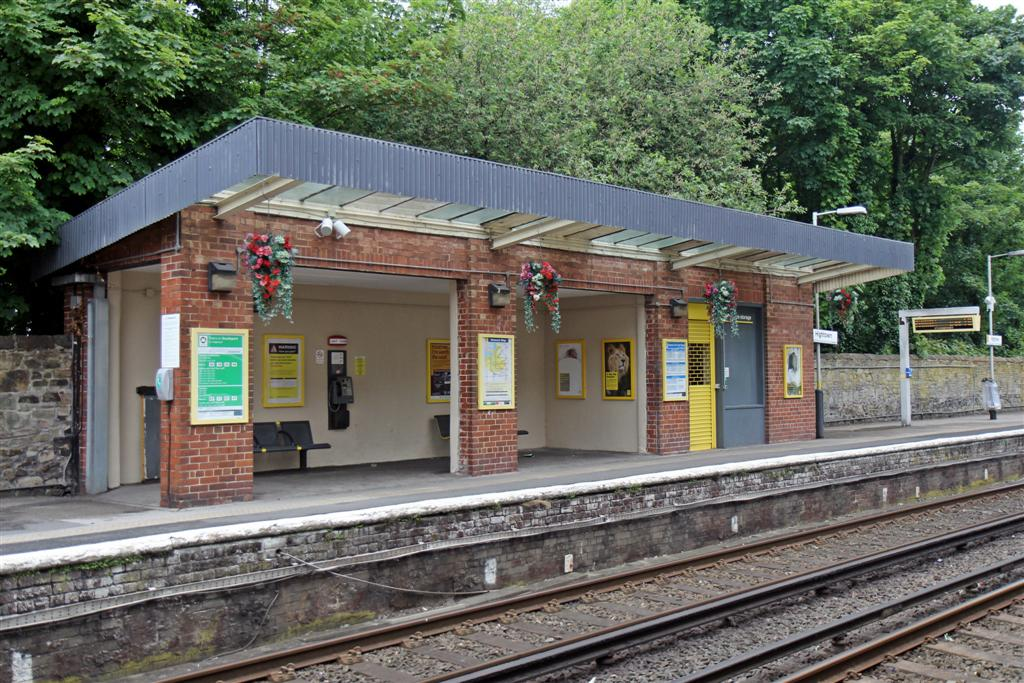
The waiting shelter on the Southport-bound platform.

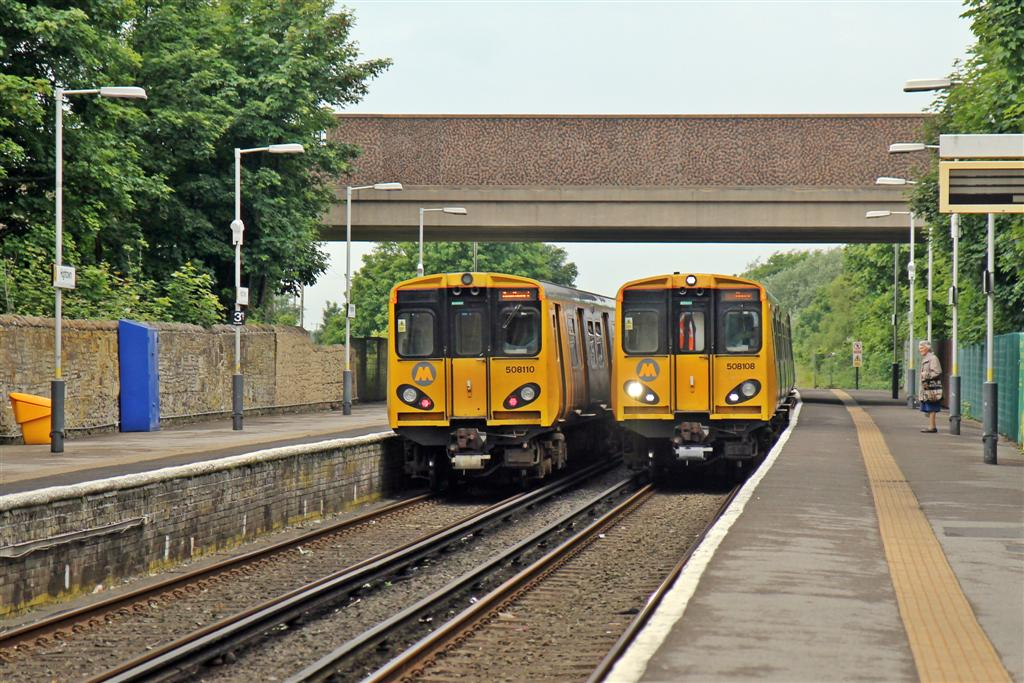
Merseyrail Class 508s pass at the station.

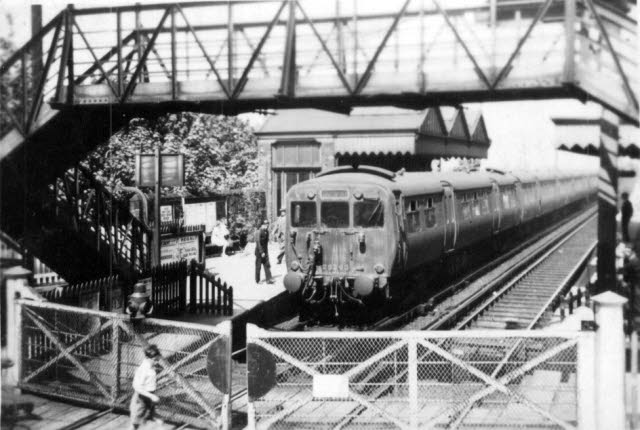
Hightown station in 1948-showing older footbridge and level crossing.
