= Liverpool, Crosby and Southport Railway =

Early British Railway Company

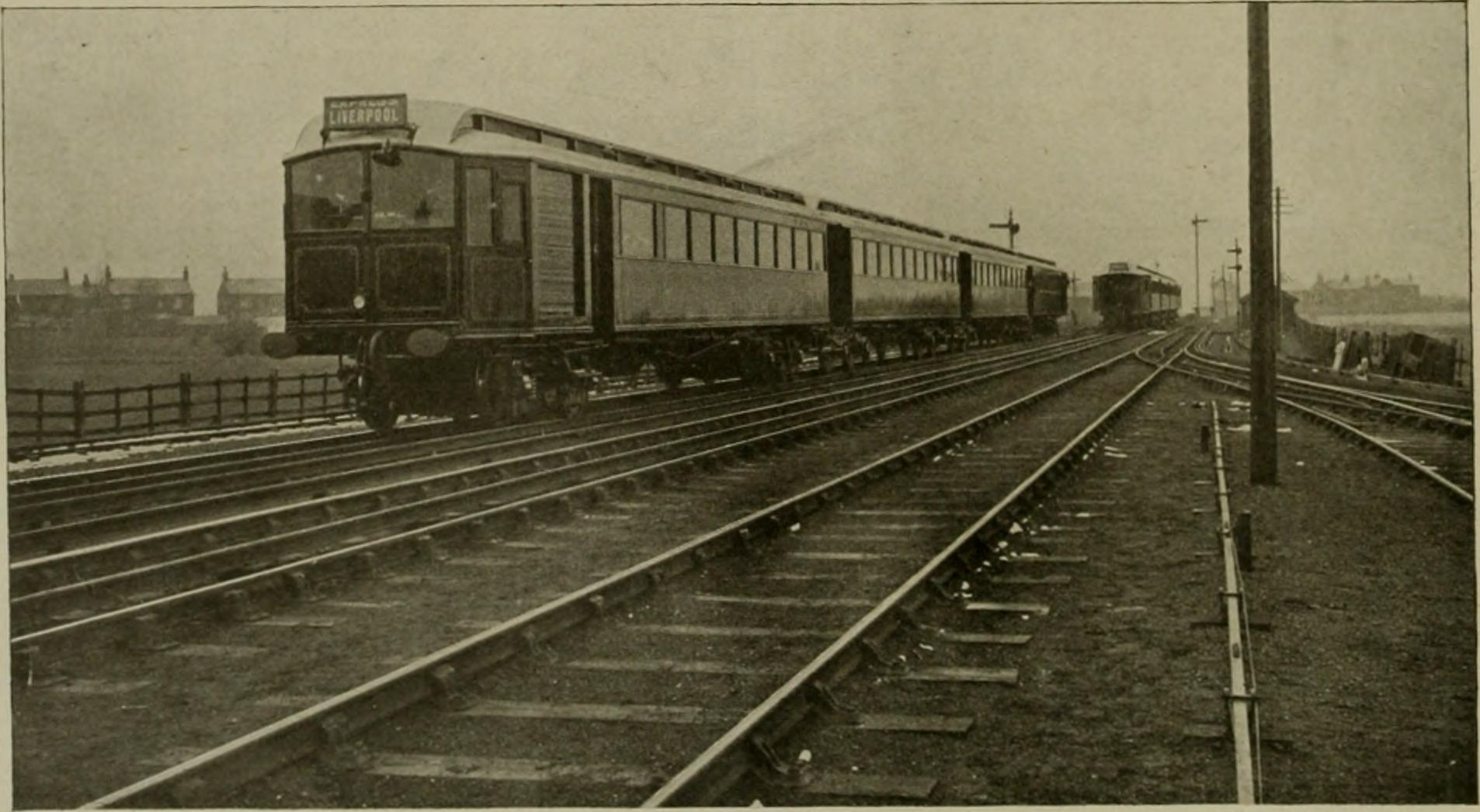
- Electric trains on the Southport to Liverpool line

Overview
- Status: Operational
- Locale: Lancashire; Merseyside
- Termini: Waterloo; Southport Eastbank St (original termini)
- Stations: 7 in 1848; 12 in 1855

History
- Opened: 24 July 1848
- Extended from Waterloo to Sandhills junction: 1 October 1850
- Extended to Southport Chapel Street: 22 August 1851
- Acquired by L&YR: 14 June 1855

Technical
- Line length: 18 miles 40 chains (29.8 km)
- Track gauge: 1,435 mm (4 ft 8 1/2 in) standard gauge

The Liverpool, Crosby and Southport Railway was a British railway company, which opened a line in 1848 between Southport and Waterloo, extending into Liverpool in 1850. The company was acquired by the Lancashire and Yorkshire Railway in 1855. The line is still open.

== Formation and opening ==
Liverpool was thriving in the 1840s and growing fast, the number of ships using the port almost doubled from 1830 to 1840, and the tonnage they carried more than doubled. it was not surprising that the stretch of sandy coast north along the Mersey attracted wealthier residents and holiday-makers. The principal places in the area were Bootle, Crosby and Southport.

Liverpool, Crosby and Southport Railway Act 1847
- Act of Parliament
- Parliament of the United Kingdom
- Long title: An Act for making a Railway from the Liverpool and Bury Railway near Liverpool, through Crosby, to the Town of Southport, to be called "The Liverpool, Crosby, and Southport Railway."
- Citation: 10 & 11 Vict. c. cv

Dates
- Royal assent: 2 July 1847

Text of statute as originally enacted

A project for a railway between Liverpool, Crosby and Southport was proposed in 1846, surveys were undertaken and parliamentary notices given. The Liverpool, Crosby and Southport Railway Act 1847 (10 & 11 Vict. c. cv) was passed on 2 July 1847 and the company was incorporated, the first directors' meeting on 26 July 1847 elected William Blundell as chairman. (Note: An Act for making a Railway from the Liverpool and Bury Railway near Liverpool, through Crosby, to the Town of Southport, to be called "The Liverpool, Crosby, and Southport Railway.")

The act enabled the building of an 18 mi 40 ch (29.8 km) line from a junction with the Liverpool and Bury Railway to Southport. (Note: Railways in the United Kingdom are, for historical reasons, measured in miles and chains. A chain is 22 yards (20 m) long, there are 80 chains to the mile.)

The company engineer reported there should be no difficulty in building the 12 mi 60 ch (20.5 km) single-track line, although the ground work was constructed to take a double-track, from Waterloo (about 5 miles (8.0 km) north of Liverpool) to Southport by June 1848. Construction was undertaken by McCormick & Holme starting in March 1848 and the line finished within three months. The single-track line was hastily built, with light track on sand foundation.

It was inspected and passed on 17 July 1848, formally opened on 21 July with public traffic starting on 24 July 1848.

=== Early services ===
When the railway opened in 1848 there were three services each way on Tuesdays to Fridays, four each way on Mondays and Saturdays and two each way on Sundays, this improved slightly in 1849 when four trains went each way Monday to Saturday with two on Sundays.

In February 1855 there were five services each way along the whole line with an additional seven each way between Liverpool and Waterloo (three and three on Sundays).

== Stations ==
The original, temporary, Southport terminus was at Southport Eastbank Street until 22 August 1851 when the line was extended half a mile (800 metres) into Southport Chapel Street station, a road-bridge was constructed to carry Eastbank Street over the railway. (Note: The OS six-inch map has a publication date of 1848 yet shows the completed line into Southport that was constructed in 1851, no explanation is given.)

The initial southern terminus was at Waterloo, then a part of Lancashire, omnibuses operated by Mr Busby under contract, were used to complete the journey into Liverpool.

The intermediate stations that opened with the line were Crosby (later Blundellsands & Crosby), Hightown and Formby and Altcar (later Formby), Ainsdale and Gilbert's Crossing (later Birkdale Park, and then Birkdale). Freshfield station opened in 1854.

On 1 October 1850 the line was extended using double-track from Waterloo to Liverpool where it joined the East Lancashire Railway (ELR) and Lancashire and Yorkshire Railway (L&YR) joint line at Sandhills junction, the railway then used their lines into their terminus at Tithebarn Street/Liverpool Exchange station, upon payment of a toll to do so. (Note: The station had two names because the joint owners could not agree on a name. The (L&YR) named the station Liverpool Exchange Station with the (ELR) naming the station Liverpool Tithebarn Street.)

The extension opened with only one intermediate station at Seaforth (later Seaforth & Litherland), but shortly after the line opened further stations were provided at Miller's Bridge, Bootle Village and Marsh Lane (later Marsh Lane & Strand Road then Bootle New Strand). The L&YR opened Liverpool North Docks station (later North Docks then Sandhills) on their section of the line in 1854.

The traffic levels between Liverpool and Crosby were quite high and the section of line from Sandhills junction to Crosby was double-tracked, at the same time a new station was constructed at Crosby that could function partly as a terminus for the suburban traffic, the station opened on 1 June 1852, the remainder of the line was doubled by September 1852.

== Leasing and amalgamation ==
Liverpool, Crosby and Southport Railway (Sale or Lease) Act 1850
- Act of Parliament
- Parliament of the United Kingdom
- Long title: An Act to enable the Liverpool, Crosby, and Southport Railway Company to sell or lease their Railway to the Lancashire and Yorkshire Railway Company.
- Citation: 13 & 14 Vict. c. xcix

Dates
- Royal assent: 14 August 1850

In August 1850 the LC&SR had been authorised by the Liverpool, Crosby and Southport Railway (Sale or Lease) Act 1850 (13 & 14 Vict. c. xcix) to lease, sell or transfer its railway to the L&YR, in October 1850 an agreement was reached with the L&YR for them to take on a lease starting on 10 October 1850, the L&YR took over the working of the line from this date and the LC&SR locomotives and stock were passed over to the L&YR. (Note: An Act to enable the Liverpool, Crosby, and Southport Railway Company to sell or lease their Railway to the Lancashire and Yorkshire Railway Company.)

The lease was renewed at least once before being re-negotiated in January 1854 which involved some of the locomotives being returned to the LC&SR with some remuneration to cover the depreciation. The LC&SR then ran the railway itself from March 1854 until on 14 June 1855 the L&YR purchased and took over the LC&SR.

== Equipment ==
=== Locomotives ===
The company's first three locomotives were outside cylinder 0-4-2s purchased from Charles Tayleur and Company for delivery in July 1848, they cost £2,150 each and were named Sefton, Formby and Blundell.

Two more locomotives were acquired in August 1848, they were outside cylinder 2-2-2s purchased for £1,500 each from the Norfolk Railway where they had been used by their contractor Samuel Peto. These locomotives had been built in 1844 by Robert Stephenson, they were named Waterloo and Southport and numbered 4 and 5, although which was which was not clear. These locomotives were modified in 1850, the nature of the modification is unknown, at which point they were renamed Antelope and Gazelle, which became which was still unclear.

A new "off-the-shelf" 2-2-2 was ordered from Sharp Brothers in 1849, this was delivered in July 1849 and became number 6 Firefly.

Engine number 3 was sold in January 1850 and was replaced by a 2-2-2 locomotive built by Forrester of Liverpool to a McConachie & Claude patent design. This locomotive, named Firefly was taken into service just two days before the L&YR took the lease for the railway and therefore became responsible for the running of the line. This engine was apparently built as a four-wheeled engine and then had two centre wheels, without flanges added to make it a 2-2-2.

A further 'light tank' locomotive was purchased in September 1850 from George England of Hatcham Ironworks, this was named England.

Locomotive Summary October 1850 (on leasing)
Date	No	Name	Type	Maker	Disposal
1848	1	Blundell	0-4-2	Charles Tayleur	L&YR 222
1848	2	Formby	0-4-2	Charles Tayleur	L&YR 223
1848	3	Sefton	0-4-2	Charles Tayleur	Sold in 1850
August 1848	4 (or 5)	Waterloo	2-2-2	Robert Stephenson	L&YR 224
August 1848	5 (or 4)	Southport	2-2-2	Robert Stephenson	L&YR 225
July 1849	6	Firefly	2-2-2	Sharp Brothers	L&YR 226
September 1850	-	England	2-2-2T	George England	L&YR 228
October 1850	-	Spitfire	2-2-2	Forrester & Co.	L&YR 227

In January 1854, the lease having been re-negotiated, the L&YR retained three of the LC&SR locomotives, Blundell, Formby and Firefly and returned the other four. The L&YR sold Blundell and Formby by the end of the year.

In October 1854 the LC&SR ordered three light well-tank 2-2-2WT engines from William Fairbairn which were delivered in January 1855, when a further locomotive of this type was ordered and promptly delivered, a further 2-4-0 locomotive was also ordered but was not delivered before the L&YR took over, it was sold on elsewhere. Two other locomotives were purchased second-hand from the L&NWR in February 1855, they were ex-Grand Junction Railway locos, 0-4-2 number 3 Sirius built in 1838 and rebuilt in 1844 and 2-2-2 number 8 Wildfire, built in 1837 and rebuilt in 1844–1845.

Shortly before the final taking over of the LC&SR by the L&YR the locomotive fleet passed into the hands of the L&YR, the following table summarises the situation.

Locomotive Summary June 1855 (on amalgamation)
Date	No	Name	Type	Maker	Disposal
August 1848	4 (or 5)	Waterloo	2-2-2	Robert Stephenson	
August 1848	5 (or 4)	Southport	2-2-2	Robert Stephenson	
September 1850	-	England	2-2-2T	George England	L&YR 124
October 1850	-	Spitfire	2-2-2	Forrester & Co.	L&YR 125
January 1855	-		2-2-2WT	William Fairbairn	L&YR 2
January 1855	-		2-2-2WT	William Fairbairn	L&YR 5
January 1855	-		2-2-2WT	William Fairbairn	L&YR 6
January 1855	-		2-2-2WT	William Fairbairn	L&YR 7
February 1855	(LNWR 3 Sirius)		0-4-2	Jones, Turner and Evans	L&YR 154
February 1855	(LNWR 8 Wildfire)		2-2-2	Grand Junction Railway, Crewe	L&YR 15

=== Rolling stock ===
Little is known about the lines rolling stock with the exception of a newspaper report about the opening of the railway that reported "the comparative ease with which the carriages traversed the line. There was none of that uncomfortable shaking which is experienced in most railways, especially in the carriage furthest from the engine".

=== Engine sheds ===
An engine shed was opened at Waterloo in August 1848, when the line was extended into Southport another shed was built to the west of the running lines just before Chapel Street station.

== Lancashire and Yorkshire Railway ==
The line was busy enough to require four-tracks between Bank Hall and Seaforth which were installed in 1886–1887.

=== Later stations ===
There were numerous additions, alterations, renamings and closings of stations during the L&YR ownership years including:

- Sandhills was re-sited in 1881.
- Hightown Siding opened in 1862 (later Hightown New Siding then Hightown Rifle Station and later Altcar Rifle Station before finally becoming Altcar Rifle Range and closing in 1929).
- Bank Hall opened in 1870 between Sandhills and Miller's Bridge.
- Hall Road opened in 1874.
- Miller's Bridge and Bootle Village were replaced in 1876 by a new station built between their sites at Bootle Oriel Road.

=== Electrification ===
In 1902 the L&YR decided to electrify the line, a contract for the entire work, except the carriage bodies that were constructed in-house, was let to Dick, Kerr & Co. and work began in 1903. By the end of the year it was possible make an experimental run with the first train, and a partial service was introduced from 22 March 1904, the service was interrupted in April due to subsidence at the power station, and a full service was provided from 13 May.

The system adopted was 650V DC initially using a four rail system, with an outside rail providing the power, the return circuit using a fourth rail between the running rails, the running rails and the fourth rail were all bonded together with the return circuit being made through the wheels, that is there was no return shoe contacting the fourth rail.

Subsequently the fourth rail was removed and the return circuit was made through the running rails.

Power was provided from a dedicated power station at Formby containing four 1,500 kW steam dynamo generating sets supplying power to three trackside substations at Sandhills, Seaforth and Birkdale along with Formby.

=== Electric train service ===
The electric trains introduced followed the American design pattern, they were open saloons with centre aisles, the first batch had clerestory roofs. The trains had gangway connections so it was possible to walk through the train, but they were not of the multiple unit type so they could not be coupled together and driven from the front cab.

There were 56 vehicles provided for the service constructed at the L&YR Newton Heath works using electrical equipment supplied by Dick, Kerr & Co. 28 motor coaches seated 69 third-class passengers on rattan-covered reversible seats, whilst 28 first-class trailers each seated 66 on tapestry covered seats. Each vehicle was 60 ft (18 m) long and 10 ft (3.0 m) wide, making them the widest railway vehicles in the country. The trains usually comprised a motor coach at each end with two trailer coaches between.

In 1905 two additional motor coaches and twelve third-class trailers seating 80 were introduced and five-car trains became the rule. Traffic growth led to the provision in 1910 of a further eight motor and twelve trailers coaches, six first and six third-class. In 1913–1914 a further six third-class motor coaches were introduced, most of these later vehicles were built to a longer length of 63 ft 7 in (19.38 m). Stock variations and levels got more complicated after this time as the L&YR electrified other lines and stock was shared.

Later modifications and newer stock were fitted for multiple unit control, had end gangways so it was possible to move from one unit into another and had dome roofs. They were finished in two-tone brown with gilt lining and lettering.

The electric train service provided for more capacity, prior to their introduction there were approximately 36 through trains and a similar number terminating at Crosby each weekday. Once the electric service was fully operational the through service increased to approximately 50 with an additional 56 services terminating at Hall Road, which had replaced Crosby as the local service terminus.

Electric trains became the norm on passenger services on the line but there were still steam locomotives to cater for the goods and coal traffic. Some Barton-Wright 0-4-4 and Aspinall 2-4-2T locomotives that had been used for general traffic before the electrification stayed for these duties. One passenger service on the line did remain steam hauled, the through carriages for the daily Southport to London Euston which went via Bootle junction (between Bootle and Bank Hall) onto the L&NWR line and were attached to other trains at either Liverpool Lime Street or Edge Hill.

== After the L&YR ==
The Lancashire and Yorkshire Railway amalgamated with the London and North Western Railway on 1 January 1922 and in turn was Grouped into the London, Midland and Scottish Railway (LMS) in 1923.

The London, Midland and Scottish Railway opened Hillside station on 1 May 1926. The LMS introduced new stock onto the line in 1940 (they later became BR Class 502) and all the early stock was withdrawn by 1942.

Nationalisation followed in 1948.

The line was destined for closure under the 1963 Beeching plan but was reprieved by the Minister of Transport Ernest Marples and it survived.

From 1978, Class 507 units began to arrive on the network and the 502s, which by now were considered life-expired, were gradually withdrawn. Their final regular passenger service was on 1 September 1980, the last set was withdrawn in November 1980.

In 1978 the station became part of the Merseyrail network's Northern Line (operated by British Rail until privatised in 1995).

== See also ==
LYR electric units
