= Hall Road railway station =

Railway station in Sefton, Merseyside, England

Hall Road
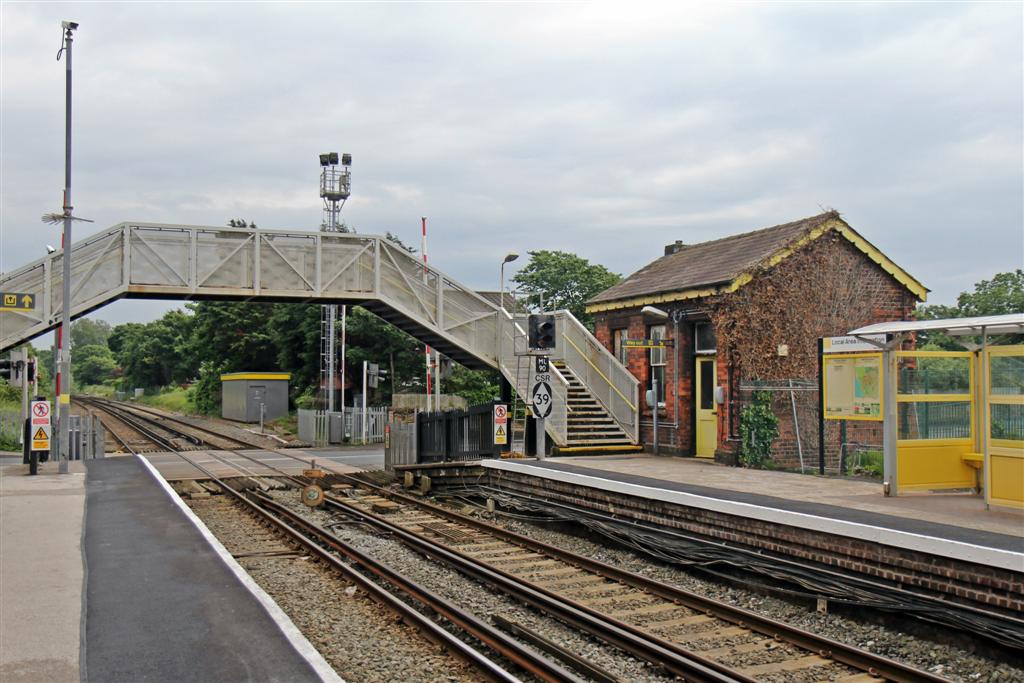

General information
- Location: Blundellsands, Sefton; England
- Coordinates: 53.4975°N 3.0497°W
- Grid reference: SD304006
- Manager: Merseyrail
- Transit authority: Merseytravel
- Platforms: 2

Other information
- Station code: HLR
- Fare zone: C3
- Classification: DfT category E

History
- Opened: 1874

Passengers
- 2021/22: ▲0.312 million
- 2022/23: ▲0.332 million
- 2023/24: ▲0.365 million
- 2024/25: ▲0.384 million
- 2025/26: ▲0.436 million
Location
Notes
- Passenger statistics from the Office of Rail and Road

Hall Road railway station serves Blundellsands in Merseyside, England. The station is located on the Southport branch of the Merseyrail network's Northern Line. Hall Road TMD was adjacent to the station, but this closed in 1997 and has since been demolished.

== History ==
Hall Road opened in 1874 as an intermediate station on the Lancashire and Yorkshire Railway (LYR), at a request from Joseph Gardner, a local merchant. Initially the railway company refused, but relented when he had five further houses built in the same location. The LYR electrified the line, using the third-rail system, and services started on 5 April 1904. The Lancashire and Yorkshire Railway amalgamated with the London and North Western Railway on 1 January 1922 and in turn was Grouped into the London, Midland and Scottish Railway in 1923. Nationalisation followed in 1948 and in 1977 the station became part of the Merseyrail network's Northern Line (operated by British Rail until privatisation in 1995).

== Facilities ==
The station is staffed, 15 minutes before the first train and 15 minutes after the last train, and has platform CCTV. Each of the two platforms has a waiting room. There is a payphone, booking office and live departure and arrival screens, for passenger information. The station has an 8-space cycle rack and secure indoor storage for 44 cycles.

== Services ==
Trains operate every 15 minutes throughout the day from Monday to Saturday to Southport to the north, and to Liverpool Central to the south. Sunday services are every 30 minutes in each direction.

== Accidents and incidents ==
=== 1905 accident ===
On 27 July 1905, a Southport-bound express train collided at the station with an empty local service operating to Liverpool Exchange. 20 deaths and 48 injuries resulted, although both drivers survived.

=== 1961 accident ===
On 9 October 1961 two electric trains collided at around 7.34 am due to a signalman admitting both trains into the section at the same time. The motorman of one of the trains was injured and two passengers were injured, one seriously. The official report concluded that irregular working by the signalman and an error by one of the train drivers was the cause of the accident.

=== 1977 accident ===
An accident took place on 4 July 1977 when a Class 502 unit, working a service to Liverpool Central, ran into the rear of another train near the station. 35 people were injured. Errors by the train driver and signalling irregularities were blamed for the collision.

== Gallery ==
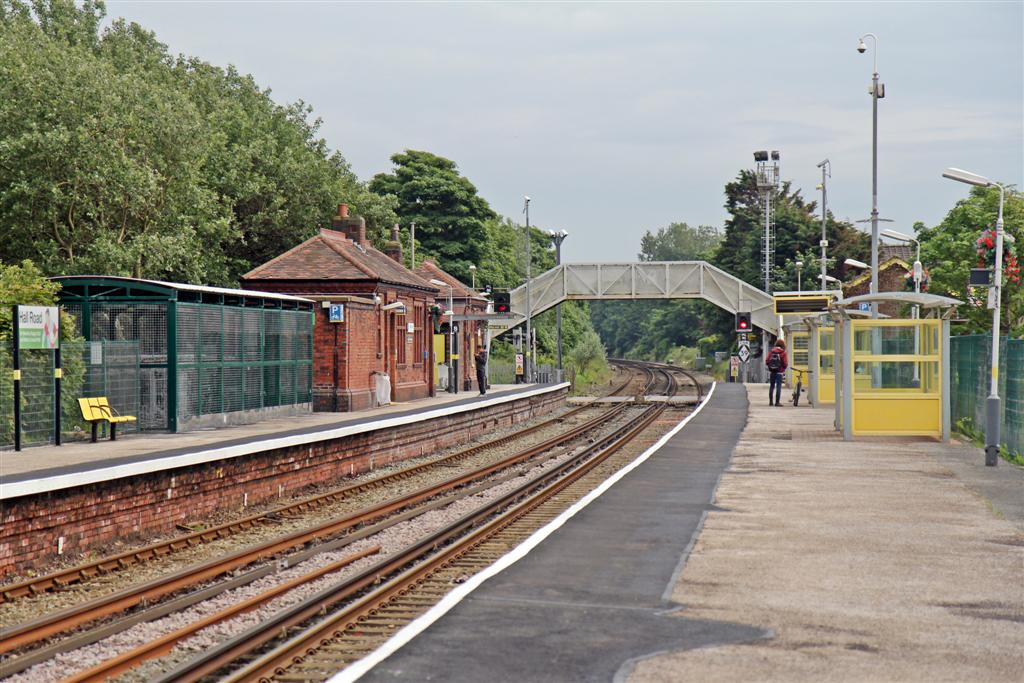
A broad view of the platforms, looking south.

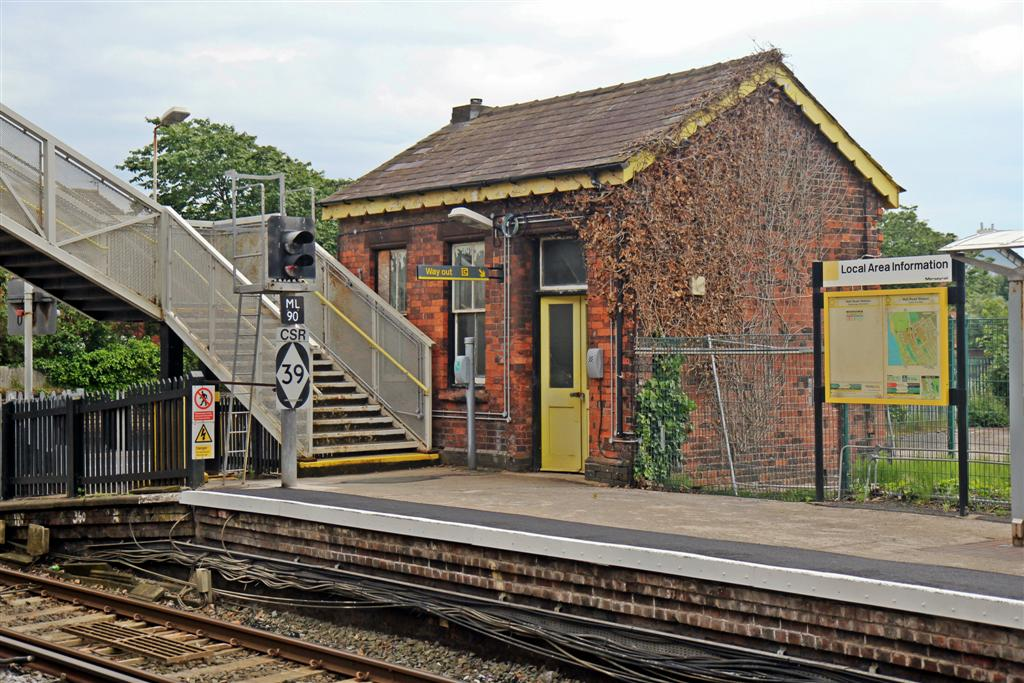
A platform building.

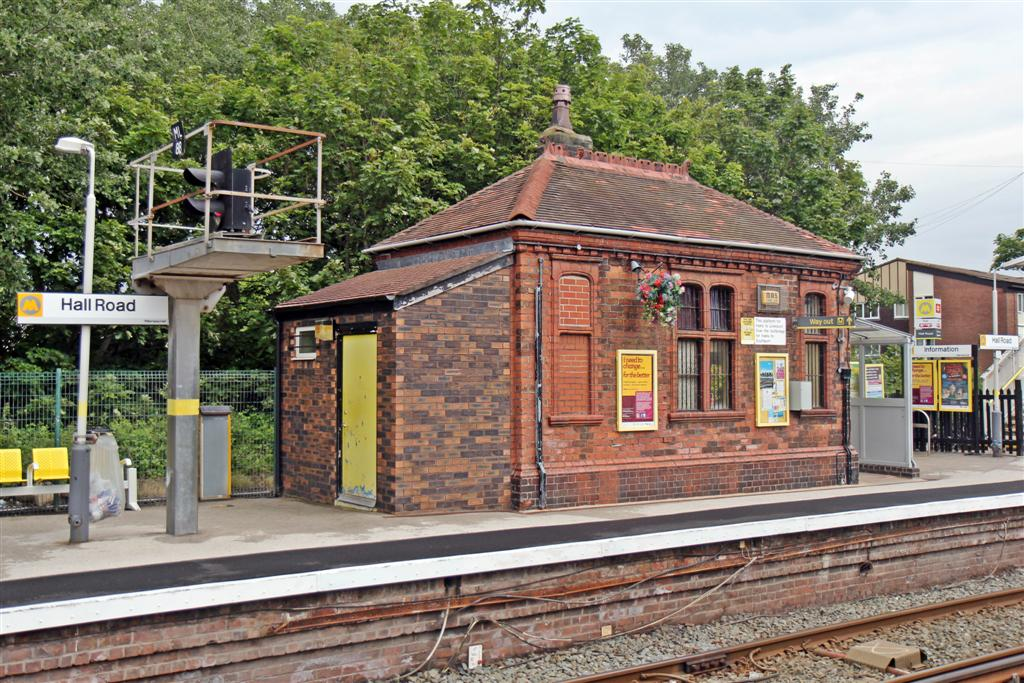
The ticket office.

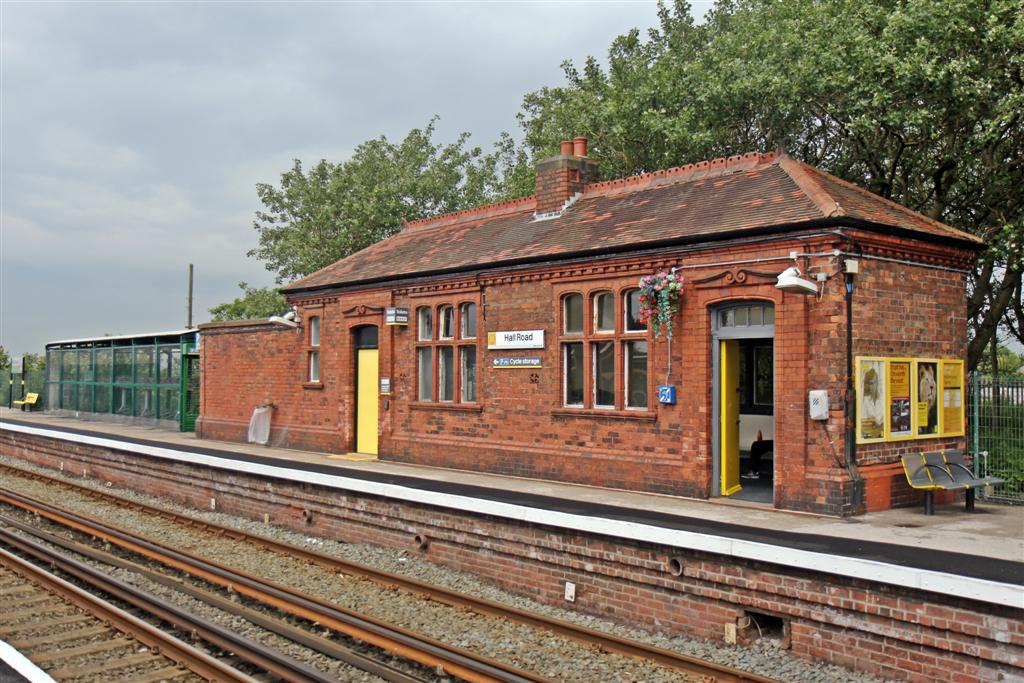
The waiting room and cycle storage on the Liverpool-bound platform.

Preceding station	National Rail	Following station
Hightown towards Southport	Merseyrail; Northern Line Southport branch	Blundellsands & Crosby towards Liverpool Central
