= Formby railway station =

Railway station located on the Northern Line in Formby, Merseyside, England

Formby
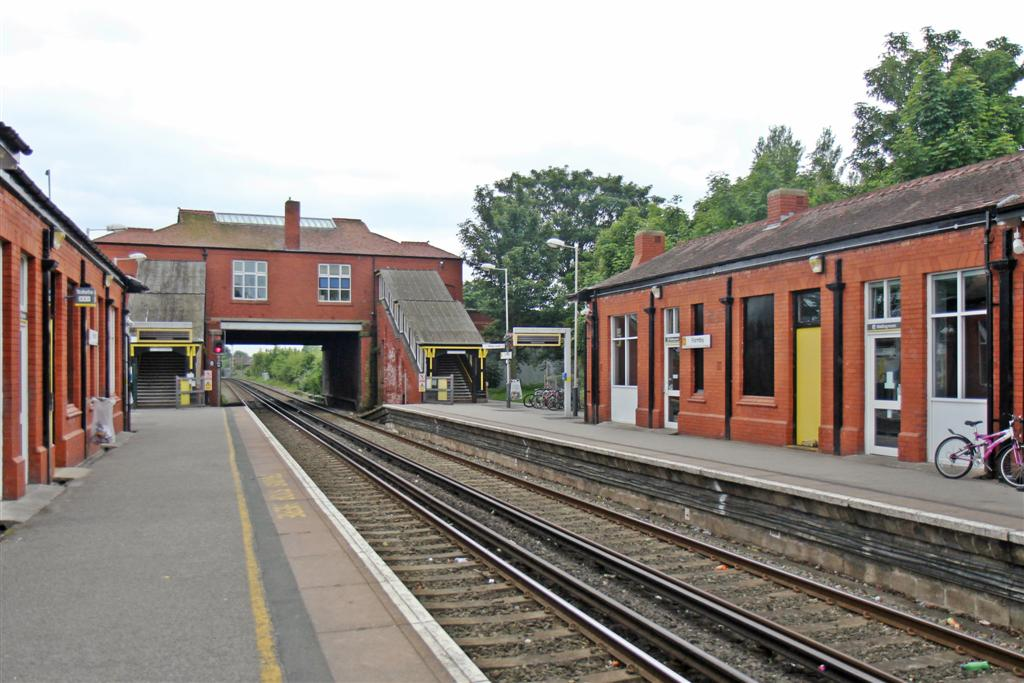

General information
- Location: Formby, Sefton; England
- Coordinates: 53.5535°N 3.0708°W
- Grid reference: SD292068
- Manager: Merseyrail
- Transit authority: Merseytravel
- Platforms: 2

Other information
- Station code: FBY
- Fare zone: D2
- Classification: DfT category E

History
- Original company: Liverpool, Crosby and Southport Railway
- Pre-grouping: Lancashire and Yorkshire Railway
- Post-grouping: London, Midland and Scottish Railway

Key dates
- 24 July 1848: Opened as Formby and Altcar
- 1866: Renamed Formby
- 1913: Rebuilt
- 3 October 1960: Closed to goods

Passengers
- 2021/22: ▲0.996 million
- 2022/23: ▲1.063 million
- 2023/24: ▲1.170 million
- 2024/25: ▲1.606 million
- 2025/26: ▲1.652 million
Location
Notes
- Passenger statistics from the Office of Rail and Road

Formby railway station is a railway station in the town of Formby, Merseyside, England. The station is located on the Southport branch of the Merseyrail network's Northern Line. The station has a car park.

== History ==
Formby railway station opened as Formby and Altcar on 24 July 1848 when the Liverpool, Crosby and Southport Railway (LC&SR) opened its line from Waterloo to Southport Eastbank Street.

The station was situated on the north side of Kirklake Road which was crossed using a level crossing, shortly before the station the line became double with the formation of a long loop through the station so that trains could pass each other, the line reverted to single-track on leaving the station.

The station had two platforms, one each side of the double-track, it was described as "cramped and inconvenient, there being a station house, and a waiting room with an ungainly wooden awning on the up platform, and only a small timber waiting shed on the opposite side. An open-air footbridge connected the platforms whilst the main road passed over the railway via a level crossing". (Note: Up trains usually headed towards the major conurbation, usually London, some railway companies ran 'up' to their headquarters location. In this case 'up' was towards Liverpool.)

In 1850 the LC&SR had been authorised to lease, sell or transfer itself to the L&YR and on 14 June 1855 the L&YR purchased and took over the LC&SR.

The station was renamed to Formby in 1866. By 1893 a goods yard opened to the south of Kirklake Road, on the coastal side of the line, it was two sidings forming a run-around loop with a headshunt, it was equipped with a three and a half ton crane.

The level crossing was replaced with the road bridge in 1912. The station was rebuilt in 1913 getting waiting rooms on each platform, the booking office being on the road bridge.

The Lancashire and Yorkshire Railway amalgamated with the London and North Western Railway on 1 January 1922 and in turn was Grouped into the London, Midland and Scottish Railway in 1923. Nationalisation followed in 1948.

The goods yard closed on 3 October 1960.

Formby is mentioned in the song Slow Train by Flanders and Swann. This is because the Beeching Report listed Formby as a station to be closed, along with the entire Liverpool to Southport route, which never happened.

In 1978 the station became part of the Merseyrail network's Northern Line (operated by British Rail until privatised in 1995).

== Facilities ==
The station is staffed, 15 minutes before the first train and 15 minutes after the last train, and has platform CCTV. There is a payphone, ticket machines, booking office and live departure and arrival screens for passenger information. The station has a free car park, with 126 spaces, as well as an 8-space cycle rack and secure indoor storage for 40 cycles. The platforms are fully accessible for wheelchair users with lifts available.

== Services ==
Trains operate every 15 minutes throughout the day from Monday to Saturday to Southport to the north, and to Liverpool Central to the south. Sunday services are every 30 minutes in each direction.

Preceding station	National Rail	Following station
Freshfield towards Southport	Merseyrail; Southport branch Northern Line	Hightown towards Liverpool Central
	Historical railways	
Freshfield towards Southport	Lancashire and Yorkshire Railway; Liverpool, Crosby and Southport Railway	Hightown towards Liverpool Exchange

== Gallery ==
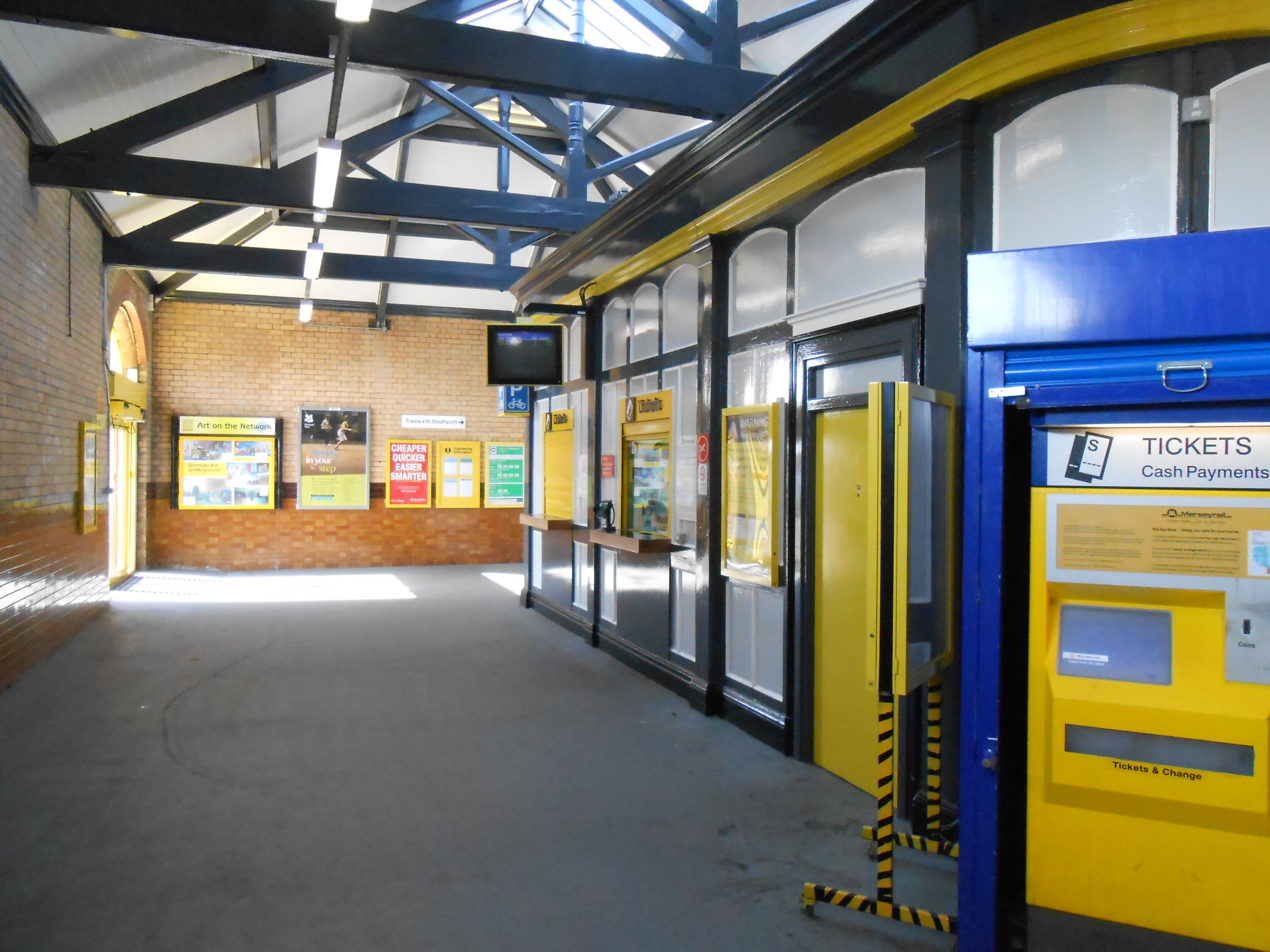
The ticket office at Formby.

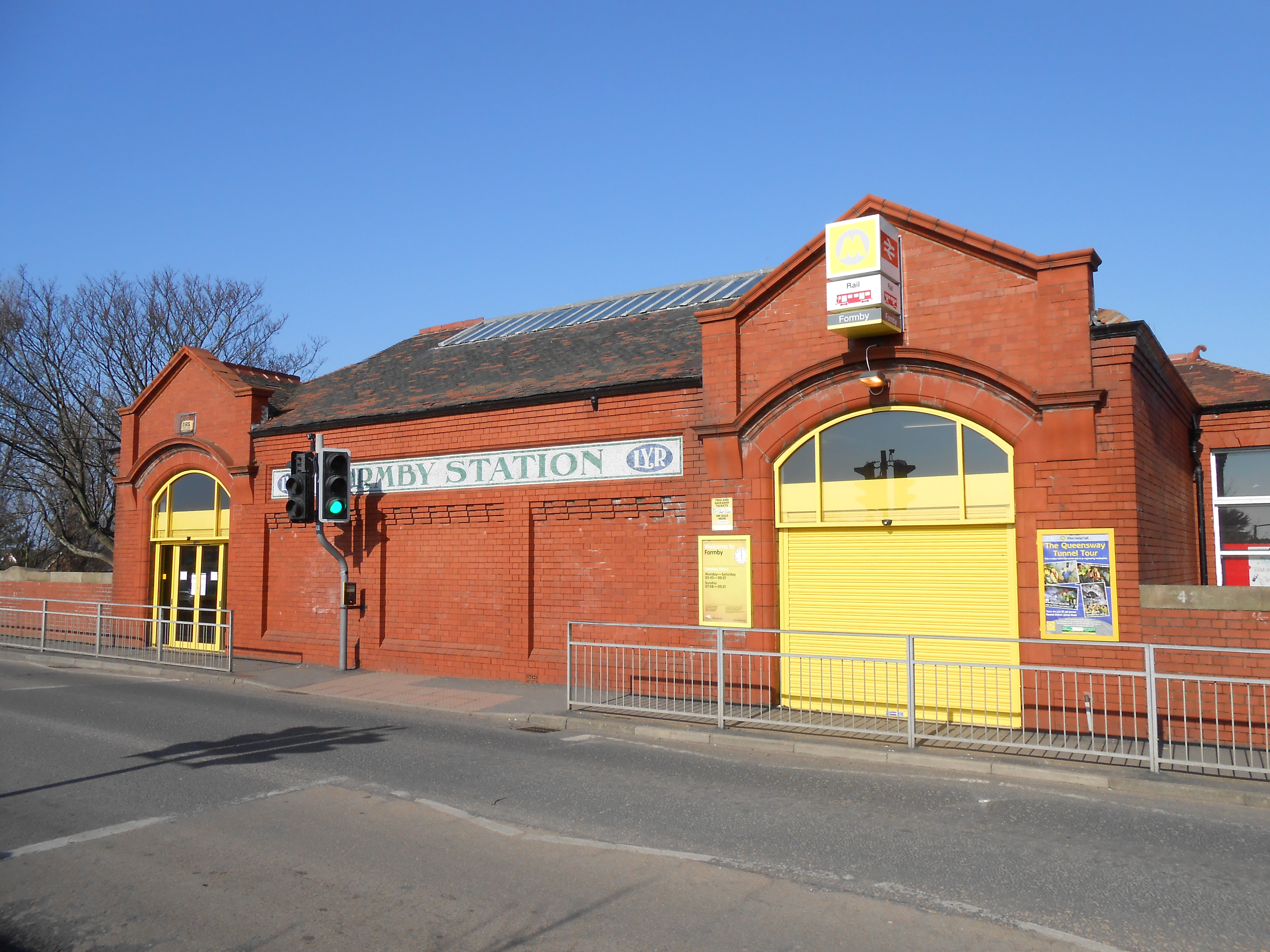
The station frontage, on the main road.

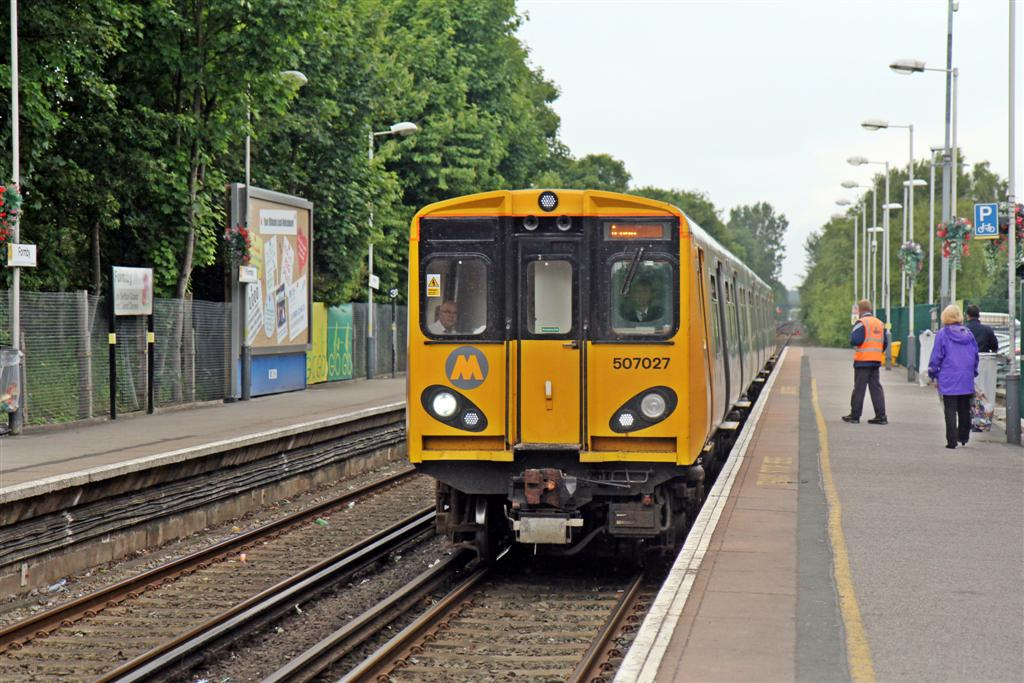
A Merseyrail Class 507 waits at the station.

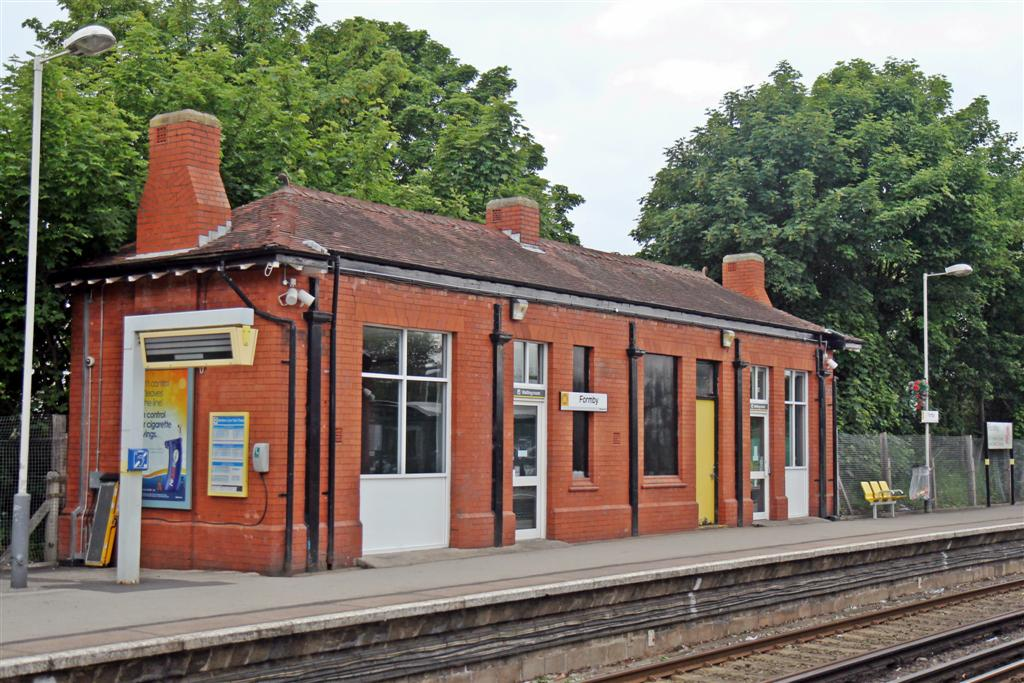
A building on the Southport-bound platform.

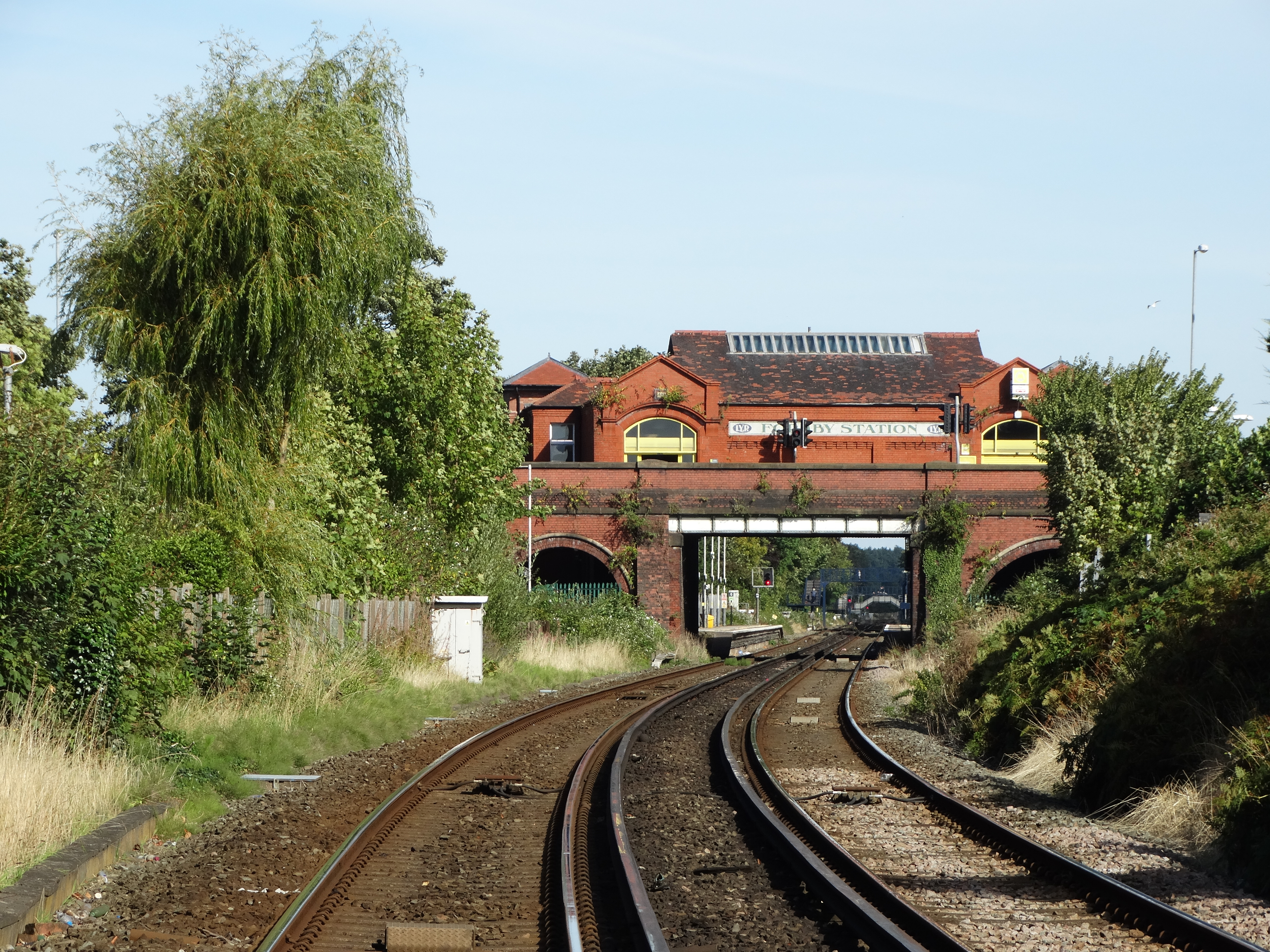
The station from the south
