= Southport Eastbank Street railway station =

Former railway station in England

Southport Eastbank Street
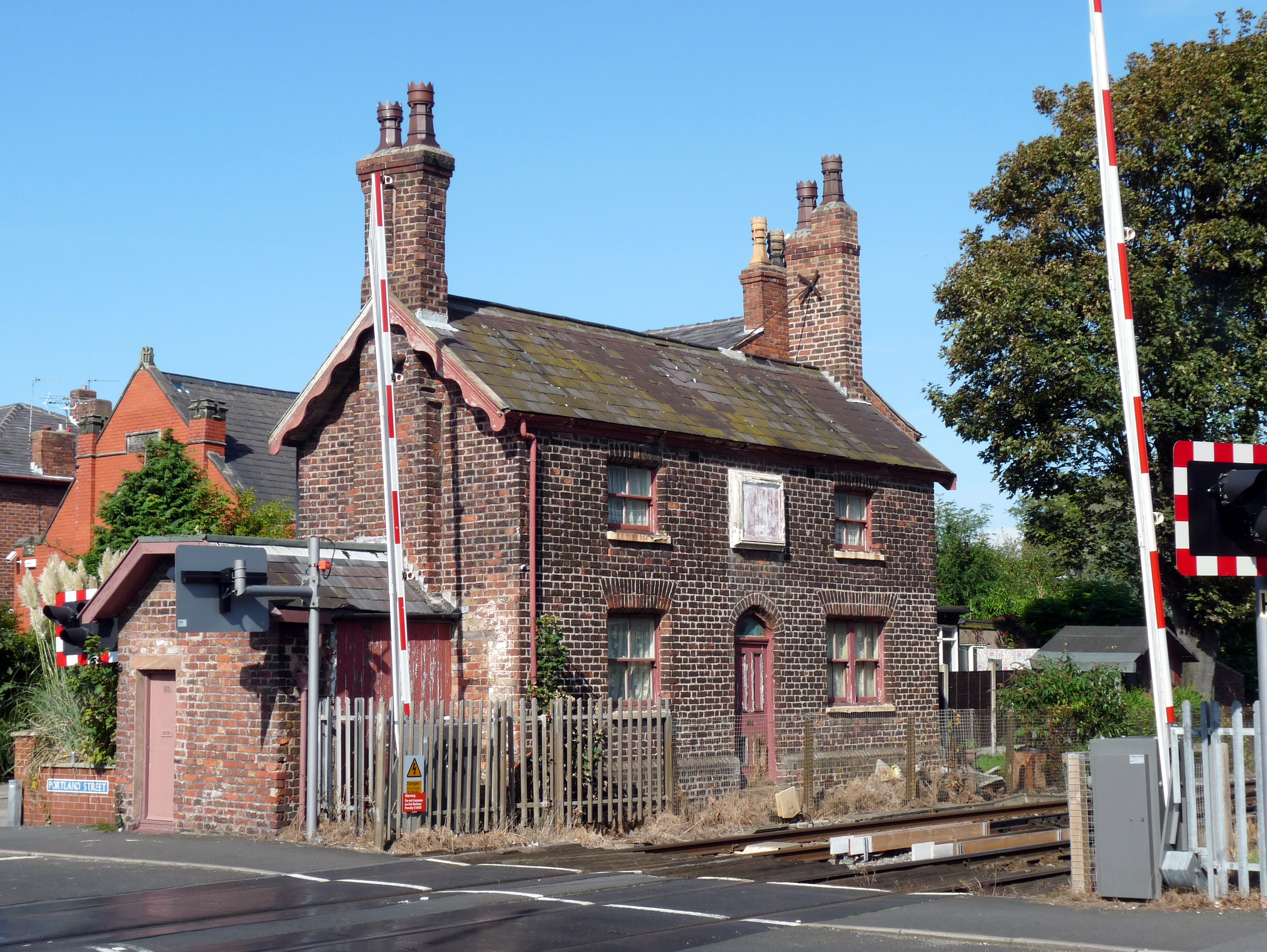
- Although the station closed in 1851, the station master's house and ticket office still stand adjacent to the level crossing on Portland Street.

General information
- Location: Southport, Metropolitan Borough of Sefton; England
- Coordinates: 53.6418°N 3.0031°W
- Grid reference: SD336166

Other information
- Status: Disused

History
- Original company: Liverpool, Crosby and Southport Railway

Key dates
- 21 July 1848: Opened
- 1850: Station extended
- 22 August 1851: Closed
Location

Southport Eastbank Street was a railway station in Southport, Merseyside.

== History ==
The station opened on 21 July 1848 as the temporary northern terminus of the Liverpool, Crosby and Southport Railway, and was the first railway station in Southport. Situated between Eastbank Street and Portland Street, it consisted of a single platform roofed over, a run-round loop, one siding, a wooden building housing the booking office and waiting rooms, a short distance out from the station was the stationmaster's house with a ticket platform.

In 1850 the platform was extended right to Eastbank Street, and an extra line was constructed along with two additional sidings on the east side. Gell (1986) also shows a goods shed to the north of eastbank Street which was crossed using a level crossing.

The station closed on 22 August 1851, following the completion of a permanent terminal station at Chapel Street, though the line remains open and is today used by trains on the Merseyrail Northern Line.

The only remaining traces of the station are the station master's house and a ticket office, adjacent to the level crossing on Portland Street. The house is now let to Southport Model Railway Society.

== Bibliography ==
- Gahan, John W. (1985). Seaport to Seaside. Countyvise Limited. pp. 21, 91. ISBN 0-907768-07-5., and Avon Anglia Publications, ISBN 0-905466-73-X.
- Gell, Rob (1986). An Illustrated Survey of Railway Stations Between Southport & Liverpool 1848-1986. Heyday Publishing Company. ISBN 0-947562-04-4. No page numbers.
- Marshall, John (1969). The Lancashire & Yorkshire Railway. Vol. 1. Newton Abbot: David & Charles. ISBN 978-0-7153-4352-4.
