= Union Bank Farm Halt railway station =

Former railway station in England

Union Bank Farm Halt

General information
- Location: Bold Heath, St Helens; England
- Coordinates: 53.4042°N 2.7167°W
- Grid reference: SJ524899
- Platforms: 2

Other information
- Status: Disused

History
- Original company: London and North Western Railway
- Pre-grouping: London and North Western Railway
- Post-grouping: London, Midland and Scottish Railway

Key dates
- 1 October 1911: Station opened
- 18 June 1951: Station closed
Location

Union Bank Farm Halt railway station was on the southern section of the St Helens and Runcorn Gap line of the London and North Western Railway.

== History ==
On 1 October 1911 the London and North Western Railway (LNWR) introduced a steam railmotor service between Widnes and St Helens, and at the same time, opened two new halts along the route: Ann Street Halt and Union Bank Farm Halt.

The halt was built in wood and could fairly be described as 'minimal'.

The halt closed on 18 June 1951, when passenger trains were withdrawn between Widnes and St Helens.

== Services ==
In 1922 six "Down" (northbound) trains a day called at Ann Street Halt, 'One class only' (i.e. 3rd Class) and 'Week Days Only' (i.e. not Sundays). The "Up" service was similar. The trains' destinations were St Helens to the north and Ditton Junction to the south, with some travelling beyond to Runcorn or Liverpool Lime Street.

In 1951 the service was sparser. Four trains called in each direction, Monday to Friday. On Saturdays three trains called in each direction, all were 3rd Class only. No trains called on Sundays.

Preceding station	Disused railways	Following station
Clock Face; Line and station closed	London and North Western Railway; St Helens and Runcorn Gap Railway	Farnworth & Bold; Line and station closed
