= Appleton railway station =

Disused railway station in Widnes, Halton

Appleton

General information
- Location: Widnes, Halton; England
- Coordinates: 53.3705°N 2.7198°W
- Grid reference: SJ522862
- Platforms: 2

Other information
- Status: Disused

History
- Original company: St Helens and Runcorn Gap Railway
- Pre-grouping: London and North Western Railway
- Post-grouping: London Midland and Scottish Railway

Key dates
- 21 February 1833: Station opened
- 18 June 1951: Station closed
Location

Appleton railway station served a primarily industrial area of Widnes, England. It was located on the southern section of the former St Helens and Runcorn Gap Railway.

== History ==
The station was opened by the St Helens and Runcorn Gap Railway which was later absorbed by the London and North Western Railway. The L&NWR in turn became part of the London Midland and Scottish Railway at the Grouping of 1923. The station then passed to the London Midland Region of British Railways on nationalisation in 1948, only to be closed by the British Transport Commission three years later. The line continued in freight use until 1981.

== The site today ==
The site is buried under the A557 road. The nearest notable landmark to the station site is the Commercial Inn public house.

== Services ==
In 1922 ten trains called at the station in each direction, Monday to Saturday, plying between St Helens Shaw St and Ditton Junction via Widnes South. Some trains continued to Runcorn and some to Liverpool Lime Street. All trains were 3rd Class only. No trains called on Sundays.

In 1951 the service was sparser but more complex. Six trains called in each direction, Monday to Friday, the early morning ones providing both 1st and 3rd Class accommodation. On Saturdays four trains called in each direction, 3rd Class only. No trains called on Sundays.

Preceding station	Historical railways	Following station
Farnworth & Bold; Line and station closed	London and North Western Railway; St Helens and Runcorn Gap Railway	Ann Street Halt; Line and station closed
