= Peasley Cross railway station =

Former railway station in England

Peasley Cross

General information
- Location: The Peasley Cross area of St Helens, St Helens; England
- Coordinates: 53.444369°N 2.719029°W
- Grid reference: SJ523944
- Platforms: 2

Other information
- Status: Disused

History
- Original company: St Helens and Runcorn Gap Railway
- Pre-grouping: London and North Western Railway
- Post-grouping: London, Midland and Scottish Railway

Key dates
- 1852: Station opened
- 18 June 1951: Station closed
Location

Peasley Cross railway station served the central southern area of St Helens, England. It was situated on the central section of the St Helens and Runcorn Gap Railway which was later absorbed by the London and North Western Railway.

== History ==
The station first appeared on public timetables in 1852 and closed completely on 18 June 1951, when passenger trains were withdrawn between Widnes and St Helens.

== Services ==
Two services called at Peasley Cross:

St Helens to Ditton Junction via Widnes South - The Ditton Dodger

and

St Helens Central to St Helens Junction, often continuing to Warrington Bank Quay

In 1922 nine "Down" (northbound) Ditton Junction trains a day called at Peasley Cross, 'One class only' (i.e. 3rd Class) and 'Week Days Only' (i.e. not Sundays). The "Up" service was similar. Some of these travelled beyond Ditton Junction to Runcorn or Liverpool Lime Street.

In 1951 the Ditton Junction service was sparser but more complex. Six trains called in each direction, Monday to Friday, the early morning ones providing both 1st and 3rd Class accommodation. On Saturdays four trains called in each direction, 3rd Class only. No trains called on Sundays.

In 1922 no fewer than twentyone St Helens Junction trains called in each direction, Monday to Saturday, with three on Sundays.

This level of service was maintained or even increased into the 1930s, but was cut back during WW2. After the war the St Helens Junction services were restored to earlier levels. For example, in the early 1960s there were thirty-three trains in each direction. From 1951, however, these trains passed the closed Peasley Cross.

Intensive though this service was, it was listed in The Beeching Report for withdrawal and it ended on 14 June 1965.

Preceding station	Disused railways	Following station
St Helens Central; Station open, line closed	London and North Western Railway; St Helens and Runcorn Gap Railway	Sutton Oak; Line and station closed
