= Ditton Mill railway station =

Former railway station in Cheshire, England

Ditton Mill

General information
- Location: Ditton, Halton, Cheshire; England
- Coordinates: 53.3563°N 2.7701°W
- Grid reference: SJ489847
- Platforms: 2 (probable)

Other information
- Status: Disused

History
- Original company: St Helens and Runcorn Gap Railway
- Pre-grouping: London and North Western Railway

Key dates
- 21 January 1851: Station opened
- 1 May 1871: Closed, replaced by Ditton Junction
Location

Ditton Mill railway station was on the western edge of Widnes, England, that operated from 1851–1871.

It was located east of Ditton Brook on the border between Ditton and Halebank. The station opened in 1851 on the Garston extension of the St Helens and Runcorn Gap Railway which was being built westwards towards Garston. Through traffic to and from Garston commenced on 1 July 1852. The line was taken over by the LNWR in 1864.

In the 1860s the LNWR built a line from a short distance west of Ditton Mill south east to Weaver Junction and Euston, building and crossing the Mersey by the Runcorn Railway Bridge. This was and remains a hugely greater enterprise than the Widnes to Garston line. Ditton Mill was stranded on the "wrong side of the tracks", being a short distance east of the junction therefore useless for accessing the London to Liverpool main line. The LNWR were aware of this and built Ditton Junction west of both Ditton Mill and the junction. The new station opened and Ditton Mill closed on 1 May 1871. Ditton Mill station was demolished and no trace remains.

Preceding station	Disused railways	Following station
Halebank	London and North Western Railway; St Helens Canal and Railway	Runcorn Gap (2)
