= Speke railway station =

Former railway station in Merseyside, England

Speke
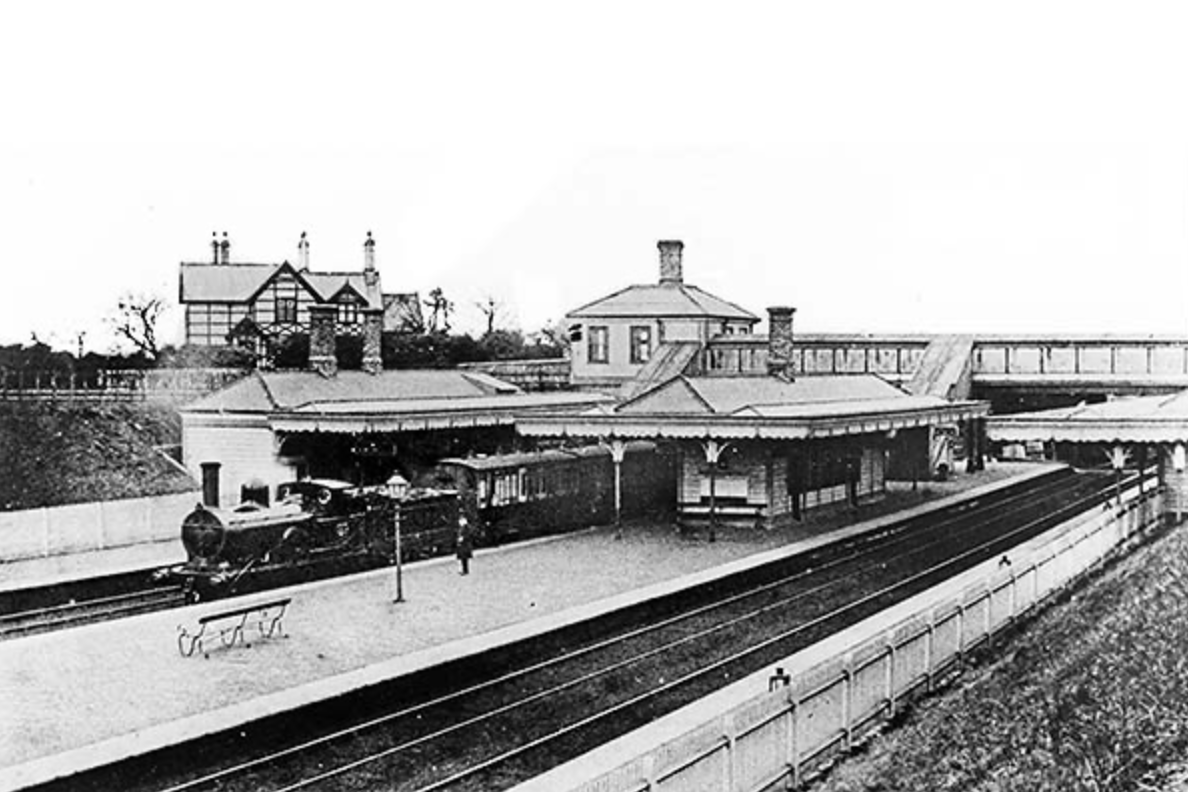

General information
- Location: Speke, Liverpool, England
- Coordinates: 53.3534200°N 2.85181°W
- Grid reference: SJ434844
- Platforms: 4

Other information
- Status: Disused

History
- Original company: St Helens Railway
- Pre-grouping: London & North Western Railway
- Post-grouping: London Midland and Scottish Railway

Key dates
- September 1852: Opened
- 22 September 1930: Closed
Location

Speke railway station served the town of Speke, on the south-eastern edge of Liverpool, in Merseyside, England, between 1852 and 1930.

== History ==
The station was opened in September 1852, on what is now the West Coast Main Line, by the St Helens Canal and Railway Company.

In 1895, it was served by 10 up and nine down services between Liverpool Lime Street and Manchester London Road.

The station was fairly isolated and the decision to close it was made, due to its good bus connections and proximity to Hunts Cross station; it was closed on 22 September 1930.

| Preceding station | National Rail | Following station |
|---|---|---|
| Church Road Garston | St Helens Railway | Halebank |
| Allerton | St Helens Railway | Halebank |

== The site today ==
The main station building was demolished in the 1930s, but the north side entrance building and the platforms were extant in 1947; it is likely that they were demolished in the 1950s. Part of the down slow platform building remains extant.
