= Sankey Bridges railway station =

Former railway station in England

Sankey Bridges

General information
- Location: Warrington, Warrington, Cheshire; England
- Coordinates: 53.383819°N 2.628125°W
- Grid reference: SJ583876
- Platforms: 2

Other information
- Status: Disused

History
- Original company: St Helens and Runcorn Gap Railway
- Pre-grouping: LNWR

Key dates
- 1 February 1853: Station opened
- 26 Sept.1949: Station closed
Location

Sankey Bridges railway station was a railway station in Sankey Bridges in southwestern Warrington, England. It was located immediately west of a swing bridge over the Sankey Canal. The station site is to the south of Old Liverpool Road, Warrington.

== History ==
The station was built and operated by the St Helens and Runcorn Gap Railway, which was absorbed into the London and North Western Railway from 1 August 1864. The line and station duly passed to the LMS at grouping and to London Midland Region of British Railways at nationalisation in 1948.

The 1922 timetable shows ten "Up" (towards Manchester) trains calling on "Weekdays" (Mondays to Saturdays.) Eight called at almost all stations between Liverpool Lime St and Manchester London Rd, as it then was, a journey of over 2 hours for the 37 miles via Warrington Bank Quay Low Level. Of the other two, one terminated at Warrington and the other at Altrincham.

"Down" services were similar. No trains called on Sundays.

The station closed on 26 Sept 1949.

The station was demolished step by step over the following years. By 2010 only the eastbound platform was in place, under long grass.

The line through the station continued in normal passenger use until 10 September 1962 when the Liverpool Lime St to Warrington via Widnes South service was withdrawn, though a lone late night Liverpool to York Postal continued to use the route until 9 September 1963, when it was diverted via Earlestown to reduce operating costs. Warrington Bank Quay Low Level remained open until 14 June 1965 but it is unclear what traffic this served along the route after the Postal was diverted.

In 2015 the tracks through the station site remained heavily used, primarily by trains to and from Fiddlers Ferry Power Station, though a few other booked freights and occasional diversions used the line through to Ditton Junction.

| Preceding station | Disused railways | Following station |
|---|---|---|
| Whitecross; Line open, station closed | London and North Western Railway; St Helens and Runcorn Gap Railway | Fidlers Ferry & Penketh; Line open, station closed |
