= Whitecross railway station =

Former railway station in England

Whitecross

General information
- Location: Warrington, Warrington, Cheshire; England
- Coordinates: 53.386728°N 2.610953°W
- Grid reference: SJ594880
- Platforms: 2 (Probably)

Other information
- Status: Disused

History
- Original company: St Helens and Runcorn Gap Railway

Key dates
- 1 February 1853: Station opened as a temporary terminus
- 1 May 1854: Station closed when the through line was opened
Location

Whitecross railway station was in the Whitecross area of Warrington, England. It was built and operated by the St Helens and Runcorn Gap Railway as a temporary terminus on its line pushing east from Widnes to join with the Warrington & Stockport Railway pushing west from Altrincham. Its exact location is open to debate, as no trace remains. Tolson cites the line's inspector, Captain Wynne, as giving the Whitecross to Arpley extension as the very precise 45.75 chains (0.920 km), but as the location of the Arpley datum point is unclear then the location of Whitecross station is also precisely unclear. Tolson concludes that the station was probably 'just east of Litton Mill Crossing'. The map reference and co-ordinates used in the station data above are based on an interpretation of the map repeatedly used in the Disused Stations UK website, although that site does not include a prose section on Whitecross station. The admirably frank 8D Association site concludes "The site of this station has been completely lost with the building works that have occurred in the area we do not believe any pictures exist or that the site of the station can be located."

The line through the station site continued in passenger use until 10 September 1962 when the Liverpool Lime St to Warrington via Widnes South service was withdrawn, though a lone late night Liverpool to York Postal continued to use the route until 9 September 1963, when it was diverted via Earlestown to reduce operating costs. Warrington Bank Quay Low Level remained open until 14 June 1965 but it is unclear what traffic this served along the route after the Postal was diverted.

In 2015 the tracks through the station site remained heavily used, primarily by trains to and from Fiddlers Ferry Power Station, though a few other booked freights and occasional diversions used the line through to Ditton Junction.

Preceding station	Disused railways	Following station
Terminus	St Helens and Runcorn Gap Railway	Sankey Bridges; Line open, station closed
