= Farnworth & Bold railway station =

Former railway station in England

Farnworth & Bold
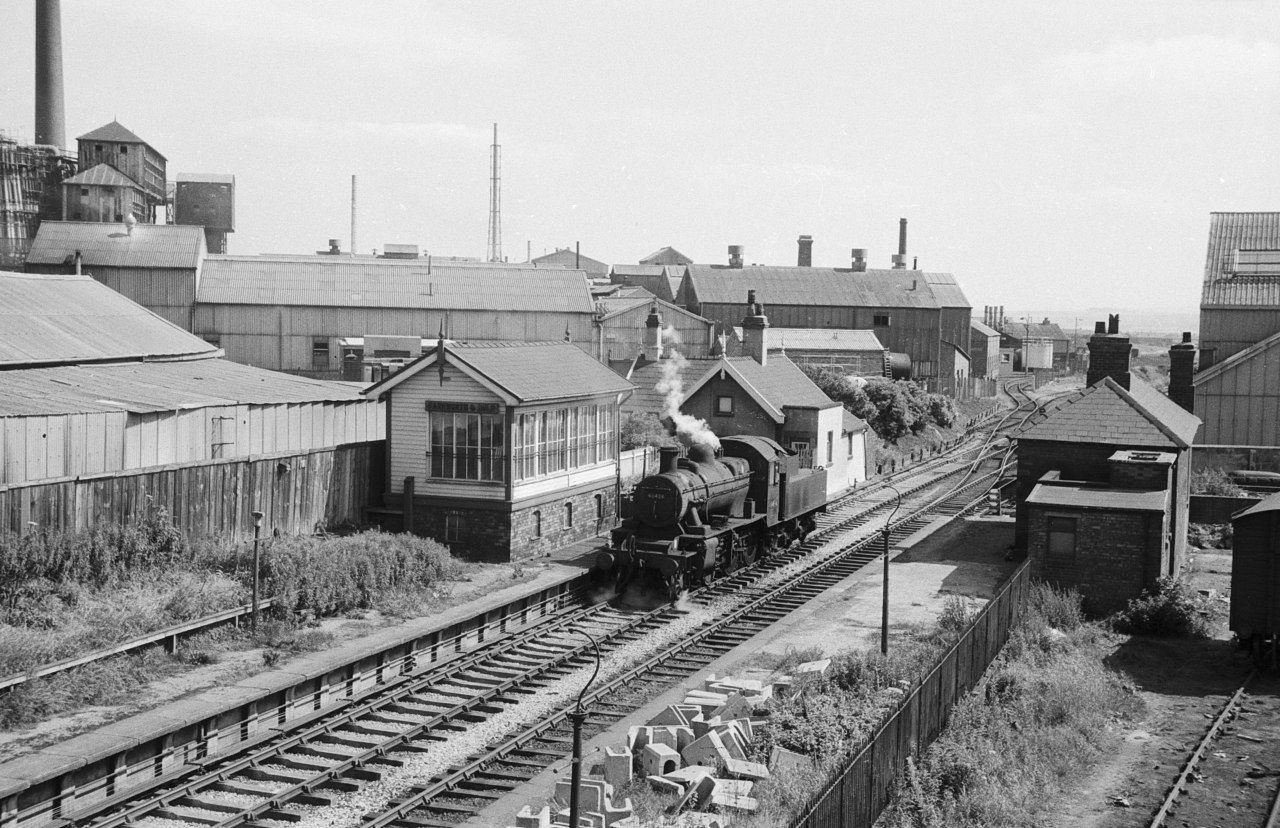
- The disused station in June 1964

General information
- Location: Widnes, Halton; England
- Coordinates: 53.386238°N 2.717560°W
- Grid reference: SJ 523 879
- Platforms: 2

Other information
- Status: Disused

History
- Original company: St Helens and Runcorn Gap Railway
- Pre-grouping: London and North Western Railway
- Post-grouping: London, Midland and Scottish Railway

Key dates
- 1852: Station opened
- 18 June 1951: Closed to passengers
- 1 June 1964: Closed completely
Location

Farnworth & Bold railway station served the Farnworth area of Widnes, England. The station was on the southern section of the St Helens and Runcorn Gap Railway which was later absorbed by the London and North Western Railway.

== History ==
The station first appeared in public timetables in 1852 as plain Farnworth. Its name was changed to Farnworth & Bold on 2 January 1890. The station was closed to passengers on 18 June 1951, when passenger trains were withdrawn between Widnes and St Helens. It closed completely on 1 June 1964. The line through the station closed in 1981 and was subsequently lifted. The trackbed through the station and the station itself have been buried under the A557.

== Services ==
In 1922 nine "Down" (northbound) trains a day called at Farnworth & Bold, 'One class only' (i.e. 3rd Class) and 'Week Days Only' (i.e. not Sundays). The "Up" service was similar. The trains' destinations were St Helens to the north and Ditton Junction to the south, with some travelling beyond to Runcorn or Liverpool Lime Street.

In 1951 the service was sparser but more complex. Six trains called in each direction, Monday to Friday, the early morning ones providing both 1st and 3rd Class accommodation. On Saturdays four trains called in each direction, 3rd Class only. No trains called on Sundays.

Preceding station	Disused railways	Following station
Union Bank Farm Halt; Line and station closed	London and North Western Railway; St Helens and Runcorn Gap Railway	Appleton; Line and station closed
