= Widnes loop line =

Railway line in Widnes, England

The Widnes loop was a 5 miles 2 chains (8.1 km) railway line which served the town of Widnes, England from 1879 to 2000.

== History ==
The main line of the Cheshire Lines Committee (CLC), between Manchester Central and Liverpool Brunswick, opened in 1873. This passed to the north of the expanding town of Widnes. In 1873 the Widnes Railway was projected to link that town to the CLC, via a triangular "Widnes Junction" to the west of Sankey.

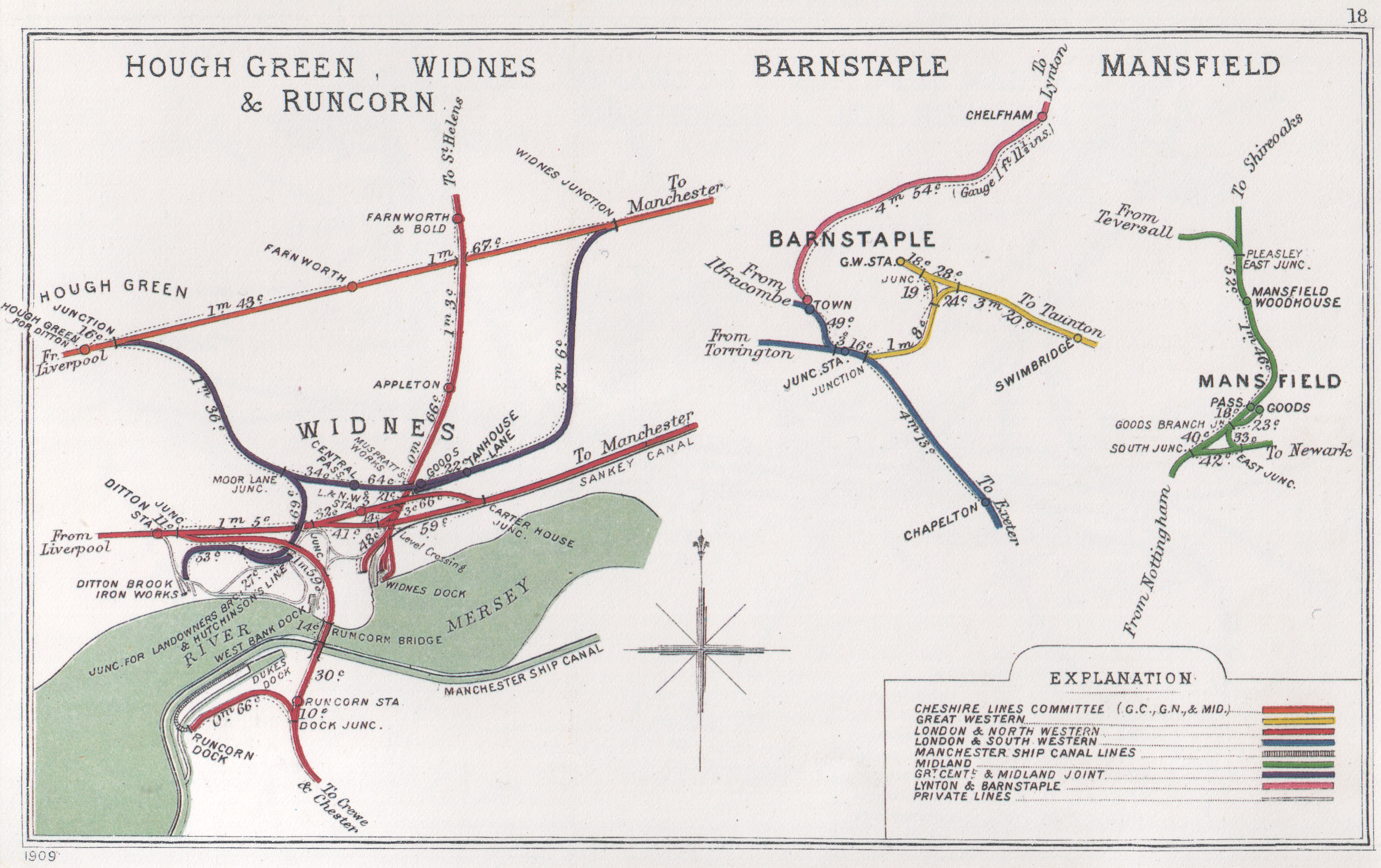
A 1909 Railway Clearing House Junction Diagram showing (left) railways in the vicinity of Widnes Central

In 1874 the uncompleted line was sold to the Manchester, Sheffield and Lincolnshire Railway (MS&LR); and in 1875 it became the joint property of the MS&LR and the Midland Railway - two of the partners in the CLC. The third partner, the Great Northern Railway declined to take part in the project. The line was therefore not part of the CLC but separately administered by the Sheffield and Midland Railway Companies' Committee. The line opened for goods traffic in 1877 and was soon extended westwards to rejoin the CLC at Hough Green Junction, 15 chains (0.30 km) east of Hough Green station. The western half of the loop passed through a 97 yards (0.089 km) tunnel under Hale Road and Liverpool Road, Ditton. A passenger station on the loop, known as Widnes Central, was opened on 1 August 1879. The south-to-west arm of the triangular Widnes Junction was severed on 29 February 1880, though the remnants were used as a wagon store until the 1960s. A second station known as "Tanhouse" and later as Tanhouse Lane was opened on 1 September 1890.

Two branches left the loop southwards at Moor Lane Junction, west of Widnes Central, referred to by Dow as "Marsh Branch" and "Landowners' Branch". OS Maps of the late 19th and early 20th Centuries refer to the latter as "Ditton Marsh Branch."

At the Grouping of 1923 control of the line passed to the LNER & LMSR Joint Railway, under which it remained until nationalisation in 1948.

The passenger service along the loop was provided by CLC trains running between Warrington Central and Liverpool Central.

The last passenger trains along the loop ran on Saturday 3 October 1964. The stations were formally closed by British Railways on the following Monday, 5 October 1964. They had been recommended for closure in the Beeching Report. Services had by this time declined significantly from their peak levels in pre-grouping days (15 per day each way in 1922) to just five westbound and six eastbound departures on weekdays & Saturdays only. The entire loop line was closed as a through route soon afterwards, though the freight yard at Tanhouse Lane remained in use for cement traffic until 2000 - access was latterly provided by a connection from the ex-LNWR Widnes Deviation Line. Almost no trace of the stations remains.

The authoritative TRACKmaps labels a wholly different, surviving, line as "Widnes Loop", this being what was historically referred to as "The Deviation". This line - part of the former Ditton Junction to Warrington Bank Quay Low Level line - runs through the sites of West Deviation Junction and Carterhouse Junction which are nowadays plain line. Presumably, as the original loop has long been closed and lifted there will be no source of operational confusion.

== See also ==
- Widnes railway station
- Widnes South railway station
- Tanhouse Lane railway station
