= Fidlers Ferry & Penketh railway station =

Disused railway station in England

Fidler's Ferry & Penketh

General information
- Location: Warrington, Warrington, Cheshire; England
- Coordinates: 53.375999°N 2.657736°W
- Grid reference: SJ564866
- Platforms: 2

Other information
- Status: Disused

History
- Original company: St Helens and Runcorn Gap Railway
- Pre-grouping: LNWR

Key dates
- 1 February 1853: Station opened as "Fiddlers Ferry"
- April 1881: Station renamed "Fiddler's Ferry and Penketh"
- 2 January 1950: Station closed to passengers
- 2 December 1963: Station closed completely
Location

Fidler's Ferry & Penketh railway station was on what is now the southwestern edge of Warrington, England. It was located at a point where the St Helens and Runcorn Gap Railway, the Sankey Canal and the River Mersey come side by side and where a ferry at one time plied across the river. In modern times the station site is at the southern, canal end of Station Road, Penketh.

The station was built and operated by the St Helens and Runcorn Gap Railway, which was absorbed into the London and North Western Railway from 1 August 1864. The line and station duly passed to the LMS at grouping and to London Midland Region of British Railways at nationalisation in 1948.

Sources spell the station variously as "Fidlers...", "Fidler's..." "Fiddler's..." and "Fiddlers...", sometimes in successive paragraphs. The conjunction used between the words varies between "and" and "&" and "and Penketh" sometimes gains and loses brackets. Nearby signalbox names add to the mix.

The 1922 timetable uses "Fidler's Ferry and Penketh". where it shows twelve "Up" (towards Manchester) trains calling on "Weekdays" (Mondays to Saturdays.) Ten called at almost all stations between Liverpool Lime St and Manchester London Rd, as it then was, a journey of over 2 hours for the 37 miles via Warrington Bank Quay Low Level. Of the other two, one terminated at Warrington and the other at Altrincham.

"Down" services were similar. No trains called at the station on Sundays.

The station was closed to passengers on 2 January 1950 and closed completely on 2 December 1963.

The station was demolished step by step over the following years. By 2013 only the base for the crane in the former goods yard and the station master's house survived, the latter as a private residence.

The line through the station continued in normal passenger use until 10 September 1962 when the Liverpool Lime St to Warrington via Widnes South service was withdrawn, though a lone late-night Liverpool to York Postal continued to use the route until 9 September 1963, when it was diverted via Earlestown to reduce operating costs. Warrington Bank Quay Low Level remained open until 14 June 1965 but it is unclear what traffic this served along the route after the Postal was diverted.

In 2015 the tracks through the station site remained heavily used, primarily by trains to and from Fiddlers Ferry Power Station, though a few other booked freights and occasional diversions used the line through to Ditton Junction.

Preceding station	Disused railways	Following station
Sankey Bridges; Line open, station closed	London and North Western Railway; St Helens and Runcorn Gap Railway	Cuerdley; Line open, station closed
