= Clock Face railway station =

Former railway station in England

Clock Face

General information
- Location: Clock Face, St Helens; England
- Coordinates: 53.4184°N 2.7124°W
- Grid reference: SJ528915
- Platforms: 2

Other information
- Status: Disused

History
- Original company: St Helens and Runcorn Gap Railway
- Pre-grouping: London and North Western Railway
- Post-grouping: London, Midland and Scottish Railway

Key dates
- 1850s: Station opened
- 12 July 1926: Station became an unstaffed Halt
- 18 June 1951: Station closed
Location

Clock Face railway station served the colliery village of Clock Face south of St Helens, England. The station was on the southern section of the St Helens and Runcorn Gap Railway which was later absorbed by the London and North Western Railway.

== History ==
Sources differ on when the station first appeared on public timetables. The Disused Stations website gives 1856 whereas Pixton gives 1854. The station was reduced to 'Halt' status in 1926 and closed completely on 18 June 1951, when passenger trains were withdrawn between Widnes and St Helens.

== Services ==
In 1922 nine "Down" (northbound) trains a day called at Clock Face, 'One class only' (i.e. 3rd Class) and 'Week Days Only' (i.e. not Sundays). The "Up" service was similar. The trains' destinations were St Helens to the north and Ditton Junction to the south, with some travelling beyond to Runcorn or Liverpool Lime Street.

In 1951 the service was sparser but more complex. Six trains called in each direction, Monday to Friday, the early morning ones providing both 1st and 3rd Class accommodation. On Saturdays four trains called in each direction, 3rd Class only. No trains called on Sundays.

Preceding station	Disused railways	Following station
Sutton Oak; Line and station closed	London and North Western Railway; St Helens and Runcorn Gap Railway	Union Bank Farm Halt; Line and station closed
