= Church Road Garston railway station =

Former railway station in England

Church Road Garston Railway Station

General information
- Location: Garston, Liverpool; England
- Coordinates: 53.3532°N 2.8998°W
- Grid reference: SJ403844
- Platforms: 2

Other information
- Status: Disused

History
- Pre-grouping: LNWR
- Post-grouping: London Midland and Scottish Railway

Key dates
- 1 March 1881: Opened
- 15 April 1917: Closed
- 5 May 1919: Reopened
- 3 July 1939: Closed
Location

Church Road Garston railway station was a station in Garston, Liverpool in England, it was situated on the west side of Church Road.

== History ==
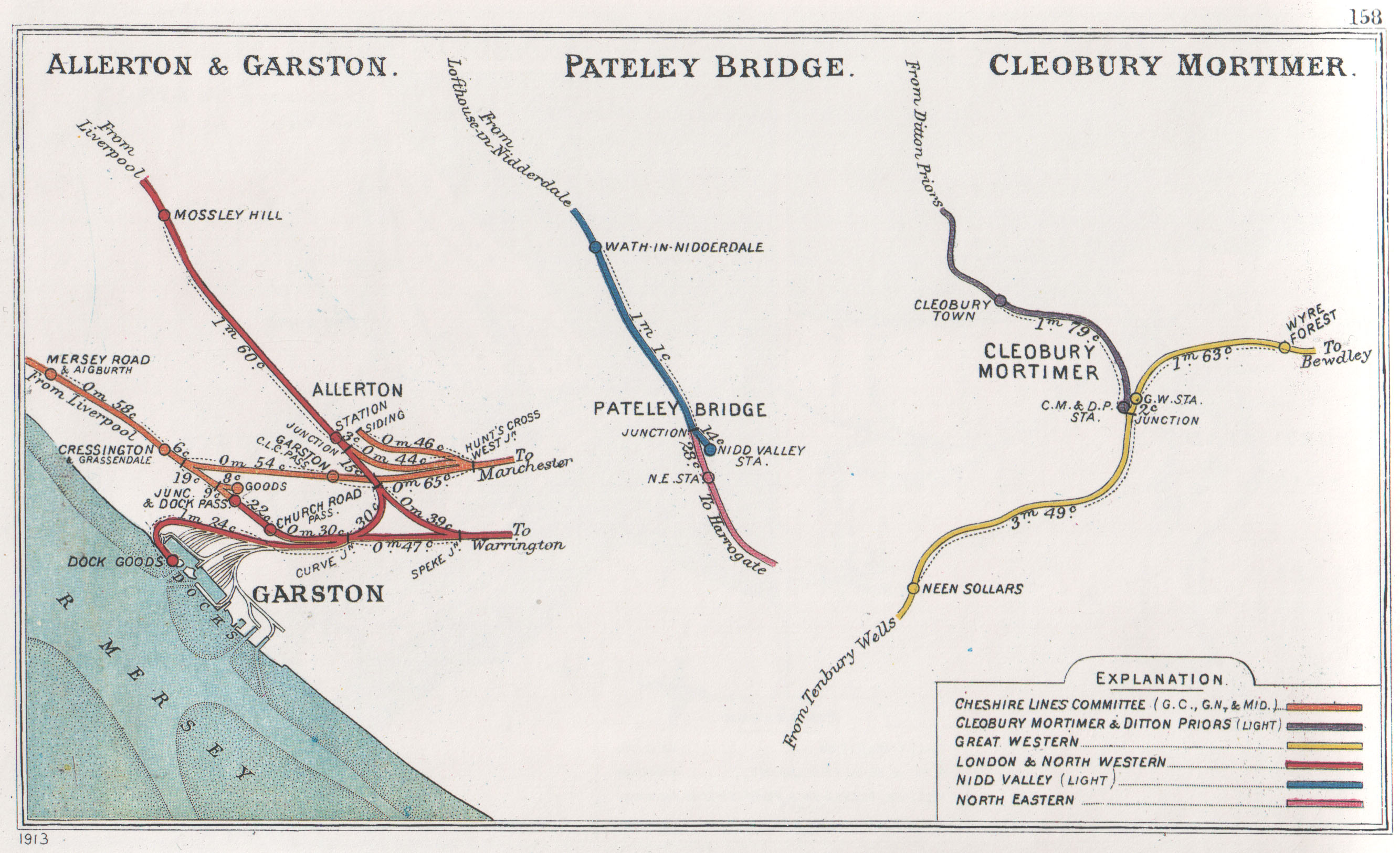
A 1913 Railway Clearing House map (left) of railways in the vicinity of Church Road Garston

The station opened on 1 March 1881 and closed 3 July 1939.

Preceding station	Disused railways	Following station
Garston Dock	LNWR; St Helens Railway	Speke
Garston Dock	LNWR; St Helens Railway	Allerton
