= Chestnut Lodge, Widnes =

Suburb of Widnes in Cheshire, England

Coordinates: 53.37127°N 2.753879°W

Chesnut Lodge
- Location within Cheshire
- Unitary authority: Halton
- Ceremonial county: Cheshire
- Region: North West
- Country: England
- Sovereign state: United Kingdom
- Post town: WARRINGTON
- Police: Cheshire
- Fire: Cheshire
- Ambulance: North West

Chesnut Lodge is a small suburb of Widnes within the borough of Halton, in Cheshire, England. It has a small range of local services including a chip shop, dental practice, newsagents, chemist's, cafe, pub, and hairdresser's. Seven bus services pass through each way every hour.

== Transport ==
There are seven bus services an hour which pass through Chesnut Lodge by Arriva North West, which operate to destinations such as Runcorn, Liverpool, Warrington, and a once a day service to Chester after 7:00pm. The nearest railway station is Hough Green railway station 0.5 miles away.
