= Ditton, Cheshire =

Area of Widnes, Cheshire, England

Coordinates: 53.36428°N 2.77082°W

Ditton
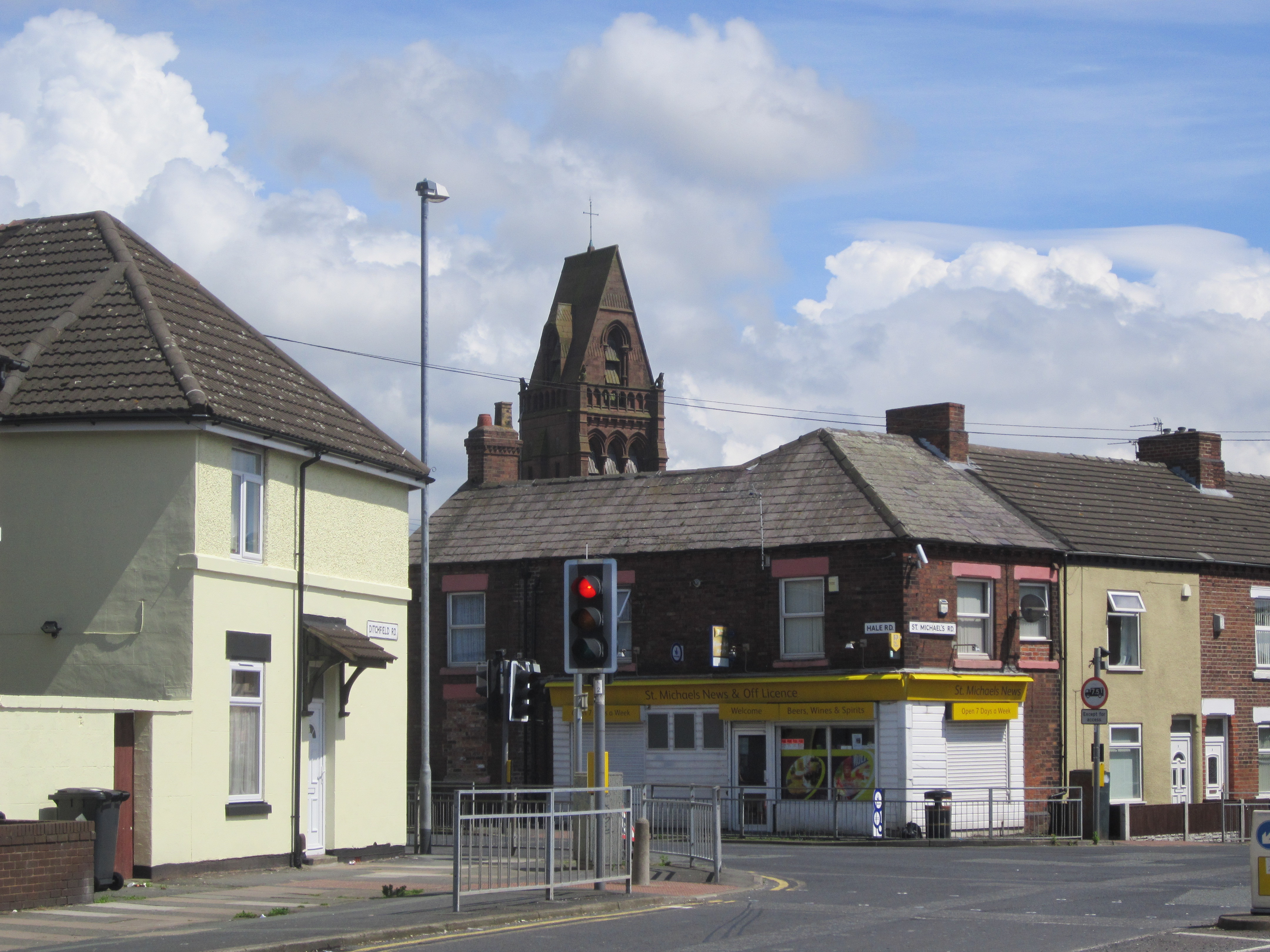
- Junction of Ditchfield Road and Hale Road, with tower of St Michael's church in the background

- Location within Cheshire
- Population: 6,249 (2001 Census)
- OS grid reference: SJ488855
- Unitary authority: Halton
- Ceremonial county: Cheshire
- Region: North West
- Country: England
- Sovereign state: United Kingdom
- Post town: WIDNES
- Postcode district: WA8
- Dialling code: 0151
- Police: Cheshire
- Fire: Cheshire
- Ambulance: North West
- UK Parliament: Widnes and Halewood

Ditton is a residential area of the town of Widnes, in the borough of Halton, in the ceremonial county of Cheshire, England. It borders Halebank to the south and west, Hough Green to the north and north west and an area just outside Widnes town centre (the Ball o'Ditton) to the east. Formerly within the historic county of Lancashire, Ditton is a local government ward, with a population of 6,249 at the time of the 2001 Census.

It has three small areas of shops ("Alexander Drive", "St Michaels" and "Queens Avenue") and the Roman Catholic St Michael's Church – a local example of Gothic Revival architecture. The area also houses two medium-sized industrial estates. There are three public-houses in Ditton; the Blundell Arms, the Yew Tree (now demolished, with apartments built on the land) and the New Inn.

To the south east of Ditton runs Ditton Road, which connects the A562 Ashley Way Central Widnes By-pass to the Halebank area of the town. This an industrial stretch of road containing remnants of Widnes' manufacturing and trade, including a chemical plant and large timber yard which sit on an expanse of land which leads to the River Mersey. The area also once contained a popular golf course – St Michaels Municipal, however it closed due to arsenic contamination, which is a reminder of the industrial waste that lies beneath. Ditton railway station, situated on Hale Road between Ditton and Halebank, closed to passengers on 27 May 1994. The site is now a railway junction with concrete remnants of platforms. Near to the former station is Ditton Brook, which runs from the eastern part of Liverpool to Ditton, where it flows into the River Mersey. The River Ditton, runs through the area also flowing into the River Mersey.

The area has recently benefited from new-build housing developments (such as Redrow's Chapel Gate development) with units primarily being purchased by first time buyer owner-occupiers, many of whom are indigenous to the area.

== History ==
Ditton was formerly a township in the parish of Prescot. In 1866, Ditton became a separate civil parish, and on 9 November 1920, the parish was abolished and merged with Widnes and Tarbock. In 1911, the parish had a population of 2,900.

Until the late 1990s, Ditton was the site of a large purpose built Golden Wonder factory, where they manufactured crisps. Some years after the Senior Management buy-out of the company from Dalgety, the Widnes site was closed and production transferred to Scunthorpe. A large part of the workforce were Widnes-based, so the decline of the factory exacerbated the problem of unemployment for unskilled and semi-skilled workers in the area. The site of the factory was used as the police station in the BBC TV drama Merseybeat, which was filmed on location in Ditton.
