= Robins Lane Halt railway station =

Former railway station in England

Robins Lane Halt

General information
- Location: Sutton Oak, St Helens, Merseyside, St Helens; England
- Coordinates: 53.436099°N 2.707742°W
- Grid reference: SJ531935
- Platforms: 2

Other information
- Status: Disused

History
- Post-grouping: London, Midland and Scottish Railway

Key dates
- 12 October 1936: Station opened
- 26 September 1938: Station closed
Location

Robins Lane Halt was a short-lived railway station which served the south of St Helens, England.

The unstaffed Halt was on the short "Fast Lines" otherwise known as "The Passenger Lines" which ran from the St Helens to Widnes line at Sutton Oak Junction to the Manchester to Liverpool line next to St Helens Junction station.

== History ==
In modern parlance the halt was opened by the LMS on a "use it or lose it" basis on 12 October 1936. Revenues failed to live up to hopes and it duly closed, less than two years later, on 26 September 1938. Frequent trains continued to pass through the site of the halt, running between St Helens Shaw St (as it then was) and St Helens Junction until they were withdrawn on 14 June 1965. The Fast Lines themselves were closed on 2 March 1969 and have been lifted.

Preceding station	Disused railways	Following station
Sutton Oak; Line and station closed	London, Midland and Scottish Railway; LNWR	St Helens Junction; Station open, line closed
