= Halebank railway station =

Disused railway station in Merseyside, UK

Halebank

General information
- Location: Halewood, Knowsley; England
- Coordinates: 53.3561°N 2.7975°W
- Grid reference: SJ470846
- Platforms: 4

Other information
- Status: Disused

History
- Original company: St Helens Canal and Railway
- Pre-grouping: London and North Western Railway
- Post-grouping: London, Midland and Scottish Railway

Key dates
- 1 July 1852: Opened as Halewood
- 3 October 1874: Renamed Halebank for Hale
- May 1895: Renamed Halebank
- 1 January 1917: Closed
- 5 May 1919: Reopened
- 15 September 1958: Closed
Location

Halebank railway station was a railway station between Liverpool and Widnes, England.

== History ==
The station opened on 1 July 1852 as Halewood and was renamed Halebank for Hale on 3 October 1874. The line through the station was quadrupled in 1891. The station name was simplified to Halebank in May 1895. The station was temporarily closed between 1 January 1917 and 5 May 1919. It was closed permanently on 15 September 1958.

Preceding station	Disused railways	Following station
Speke; Line open, station closed	London and North Western Railway; St Helens Canal and Railway	Ditton Junction; Line open, station closed
