= Disley Tunnel =

Railway tunnel in England

Coordinates: 53°22′18″N 2°05′09″W

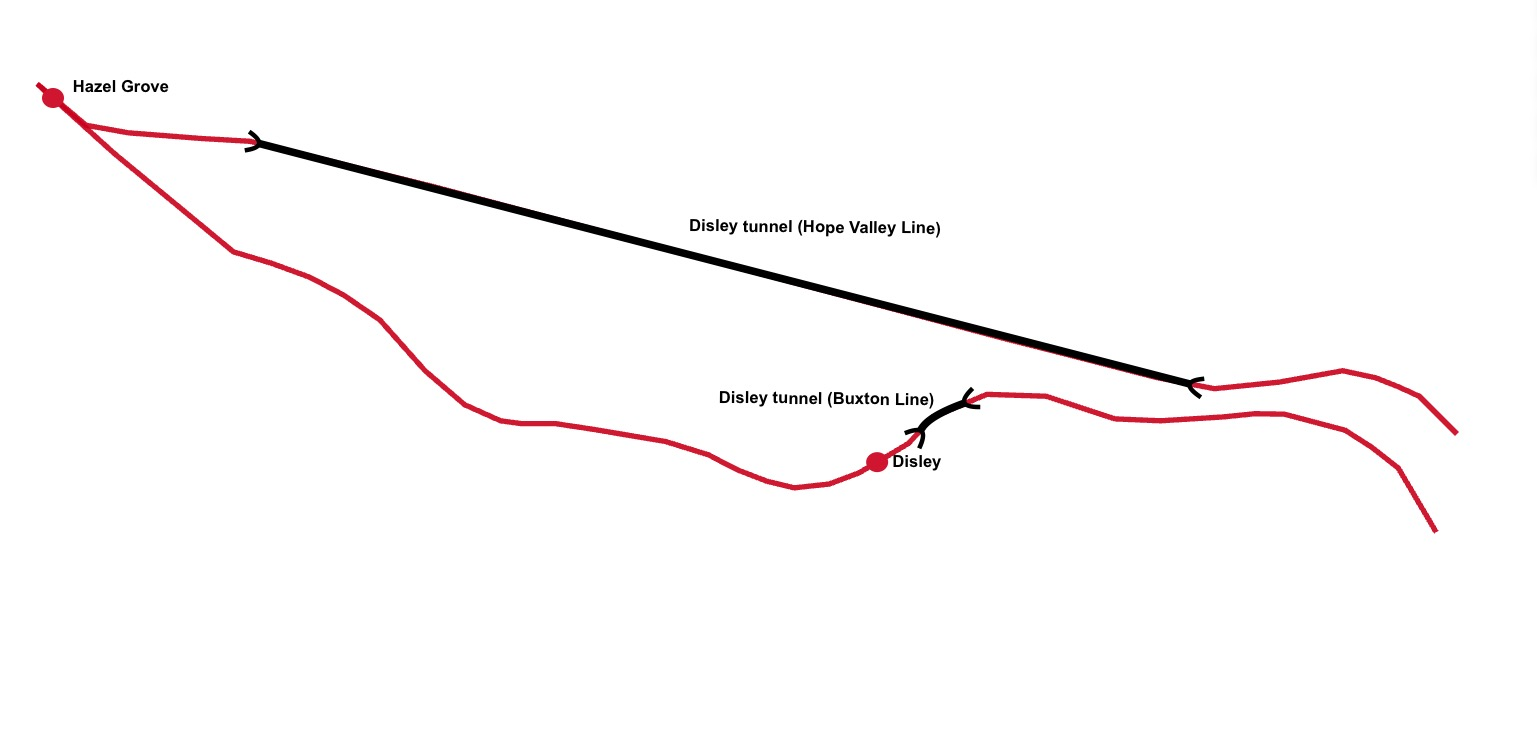
A simplified map of the Disley tunnels (represented in black) and the lines they serve (represented in red)

Disley Tunnel was built by the Midland Railway in 1902 on its line between New Mills South Junction and Manchester Central, which was more direct than the congested and difficult lines through Stockport Tiviot Dale.

It was the most expensive work on the line and at 2 miles, 346 yards (3,535 m), the second-longest tunnel on the Midland system.

By means of a connection on to the old LNWR line from Buxton at Hazel Grove that was opened in 1986, it is now part of the Hope Valley Line into the present-day Stockport railway station.

There is also a short (174 yard) Disley Tunnel nearby on the Buxton Line.

== The "new line" ==
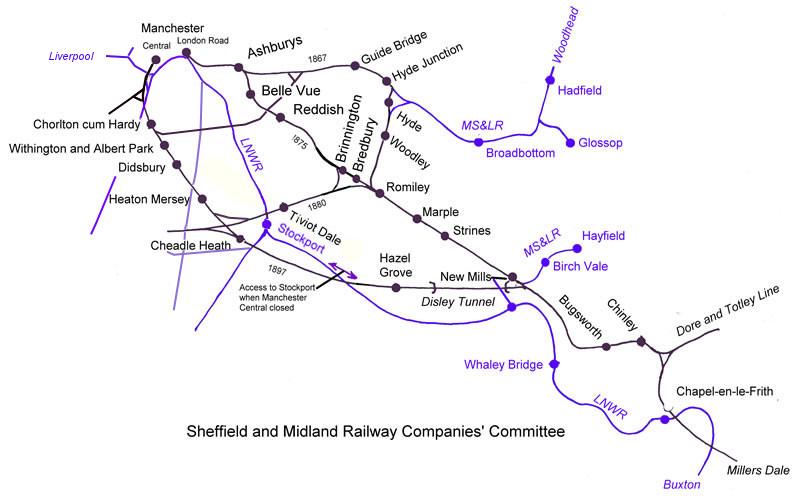
Sketch map of Midland Railway lines into Manchester showing the Disley Tunnel

The Midland Railway found that with the boom in railway traffic during the last decade of the 19th century the pressure on railway routes was intense with the volume of passenger and goods traffic increasing. This problem was present in all parts of the UK – though the Midlands, especially the Main Line to Manchester and Liverpool, was particularly crowded. The London and North Western Railway and the Great Northern Railway owned the Main Line to Manchester, which meant that the Midland's trains had the lowest priority.

The Midland joined with the Manchester, Sheffield and Lincolnshire Railway company to form the Sheffield and Midland Railway Companies' Committee with the intention of building a "new line" that would bypass the main line, and give priority to their own trains, thus speeding up the service. Various routes were tried, including the Manchester South District Railway from Heaton Mersey to Chorlton-cum-Hardy. However, congestion continued.

== New Mills and Heaton Mersey Railway ==
To relieve the congestion through Stockport Tiviot Dale a new line, to be called the "New Mills and Heaton Mersey Railway", was authorised by the Midland Railway Act 1897 (60 & 61 Vict. c. clxxxiii). The plan was to create a railway line that would take four tracks, and most bridges and cuttings were constructed with this width in mind.

== Location ==
The tunnel runs under the villages of High Lane and Disley. The New Mills and Heaton Mersey Railway line goes underground where the Middlewood Way (the old Macclesfield, Bollington and Marple Railway), crosses the line, about 1/4 mile north of the A6 in High Lane. The tunnel passes under a housing estate, the Macclesfield Canal, Disley golf course and finally the Peak Forest Canal, just before emerging at Disley, meeting the Hope Valley Line.

The tunnel climbs at a continuous 1:132 gradient from the Hazel Grove end to the Chinley end.

== Construction ==
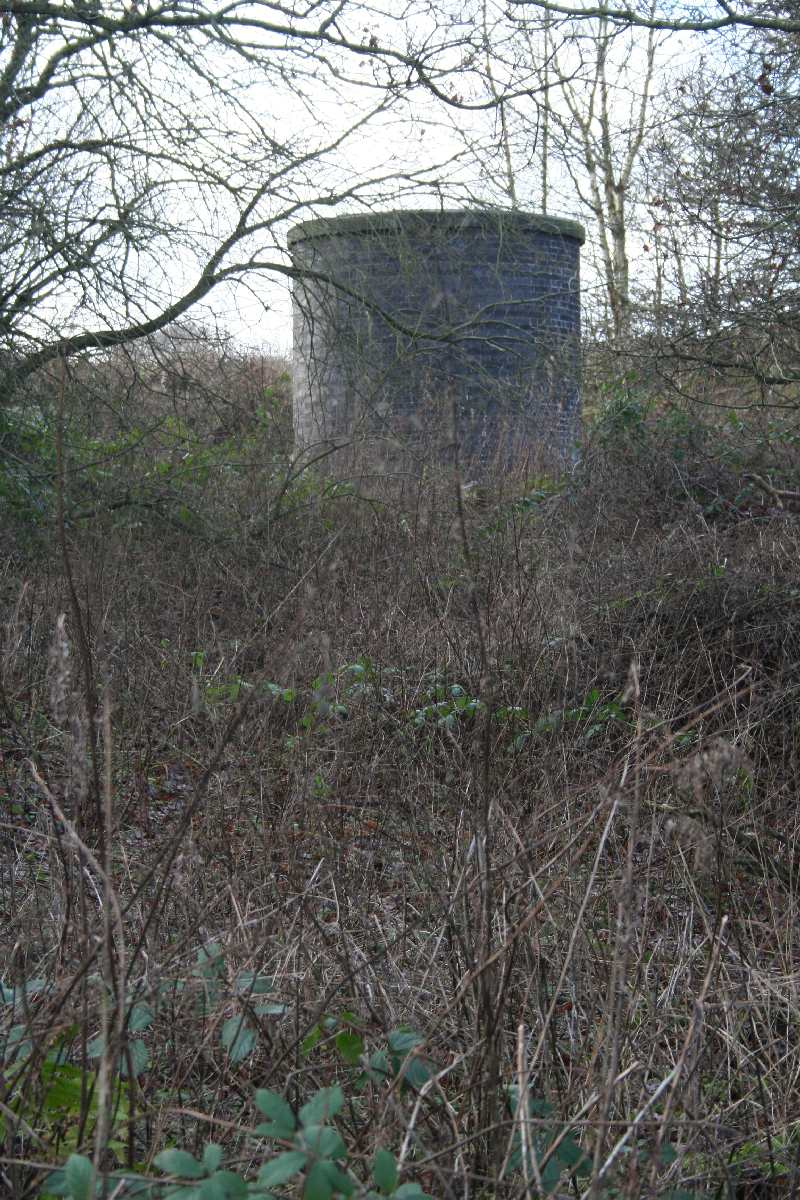
A tunnel ventilation shaft near Disley Golf Course in 2012

The construction method used was to drive the tunnel bore from both ends, while also sinking 11 shafts from the top of the hill along the path of the railway. Work began in 1900, and the miners worked both directions from each shaft, which allowed 24 simultaneous working faces. Ten of the shafts were later used for ventilation, and are still in use – they are visible as large blue brick towers following the line of the tunnel. The Midland Railway purchased the land above the tunnel in order to sink the shafts – boundary markers made of old rails, with the initials "M.R.", remain along the line of the tunnel.

A surface standard gauge contractors line was set up, using steam locomotives and a "steam navvy", following the subterranean path of the tunnel.

== The navvies ==
The construction of the tunnel brought a small army of navvies into the area. They were housed in temporary villages at New Mills and Wybersley, and in specially built houses near the Rising Sun pub in Hazel Grove, which still exist, and are known as the "Navvy Mansions". A church made of tin was erected at Wybersley, where the Midland Railway had a local administration office. Three hundred of the navvies' children attended the local schools.

== Operation ==
The first section of the line opened in 1901 from Heaton Mersey to Cheadle Heath where a large station was built to serve Stockport. The second section from Cheadle Heath to New Mills South Junction opened to passenger traffic on 1 July 1902. A local passenger station at Hazel Grove (South) was constructed, but this closed in 1917 as the main purpose of the line was express trains.

The line was fast, with trains reaching 100 mph along the track. In 1959 a train recorder timed a Britannia Class locomotive, the Iron Duke (No 70014), doing 89 mph between Cheadle Heath and Didsbury.

In 1973, a freight train was derailed inside the tunnel due to a broken rail. Recovery of the wagons took about a week.

== See also ==
- Midland Railway
- List of tunnels in the United Kingdom
- Sheffield and Midland Railway Companies' Committee
- Manchester, Buxton, Matlock and Midland Junction Railway
- Hope Valley Line

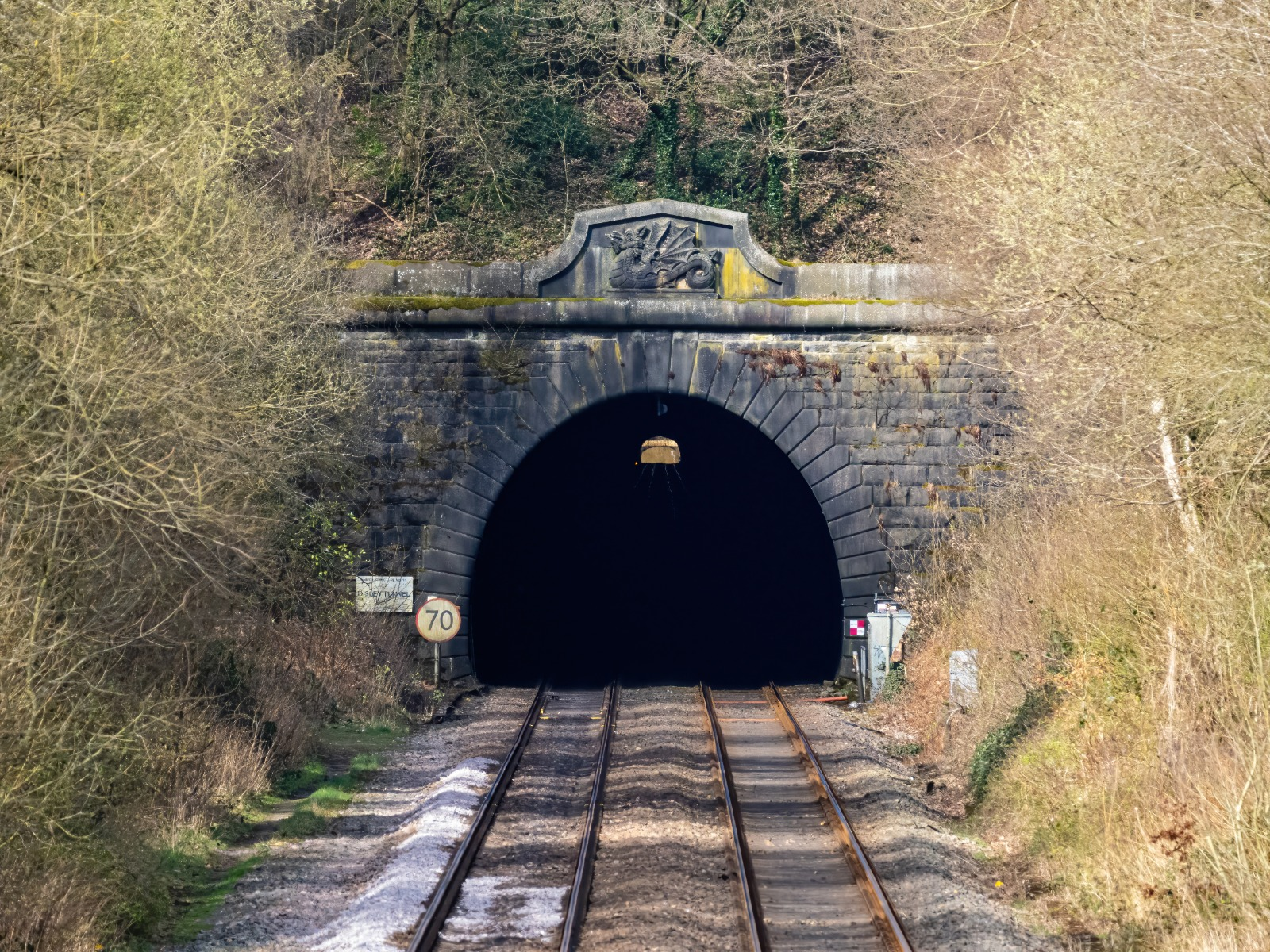
The Eastern (Disley) entrance to the Disley Tunnel
