= Ann Street Halt railway station =

Disused railway station in Widnes, Cheshire

Ann Street Halt

General information
- Location: Widnes, Halton; England
- Coordinates: 53.3610°N 2.7265°W
- Grid reference: SJ517851
- Platforms: 2

Other information
- Status: Disused

History
- Original company: London and North Western Railway
- Pre-grouping: London and North Western Railway
- Post-grouping: London Midland and Scottish Railway

Key dates
- 2 November 1911: Station opened
- 18 June 1951: Station closed
Location

Ann Street Halt railway station served the centre of Widnes in Cheshire, England. It was located on the southern section of the former St Helens and Runcorn Gap Railway.

== History ==
Opened by the London and North Western Railway as a railmotor halt, it became part of the London Midland and Scottish Railway during the Grouping of 1923. The line then passed on to the London Midland Region of British Railways on nationalisation in 1948, only to be closed by the British Transport Commission three years later.

== The site today ==
The site is buried under road developments.

== Services ==
In 1922 six "Down" (northbound) trains a day called at Ann Street Halt, 'One class only' (i.e. 3rd Class) and 'Week Days Only' (i.e. not Sundays). The "Up" service was similar. The trains' destinations were St Helens to the north and Ditton Junction to the south, with some travelling beyond to Runcorn or Liverpool Lime Street.

In 1951 the service was sparser. Five trains called in each direction, Monday to Friday. On Saturdays three trains called in each direction, all were 3rd Class only. No trains called on Sundays.

Preceding station	Disused railways	Following station
Appleton; Line and station closed	St Helens and Runcorn Gap Railway	Runcorn Gap to 1853; Line and station closed
Appleton; Line and station closed	St Helens and Runcorn Gap Railway	Runcorn Gap 1853-70; Line and station closed
Appleton; Line and station closed	London and North Western Railway	Widnes South from 1870; Line and station closed
