= Widnes Central railway station =

Train station in England

Widnes Central

General information
- Location: Widnes, Halton; England
- Coordinates: 53.3591°N 2.7370°W
- Grid reference: SJ510849
- Platforms: 2

Other information
- Status: Disused

History
- Original company: Sheffield and Midland Railway Companies' Committee
- Pre-grouping: Great Central and Midland Joint Committee
- Post-grouping: Great Central and Midland Joint Committee

Key dates
- 1 August 1879: Station opened
- 5 October 1964: Station closed
Location

Widnes Central railway station served the town of Widnes, England from 1879 to 1964.

== History ==
The main line of the Cheshire Lines Committee (CLC), between Manchester Central and Liverpool Brunswick, opened in 1873. This passed to the north of the growing town of Widnes, so in 1873 the Widnes Railway was projected to link that town to the CLC, at a triangular junction to the west of Sankey.

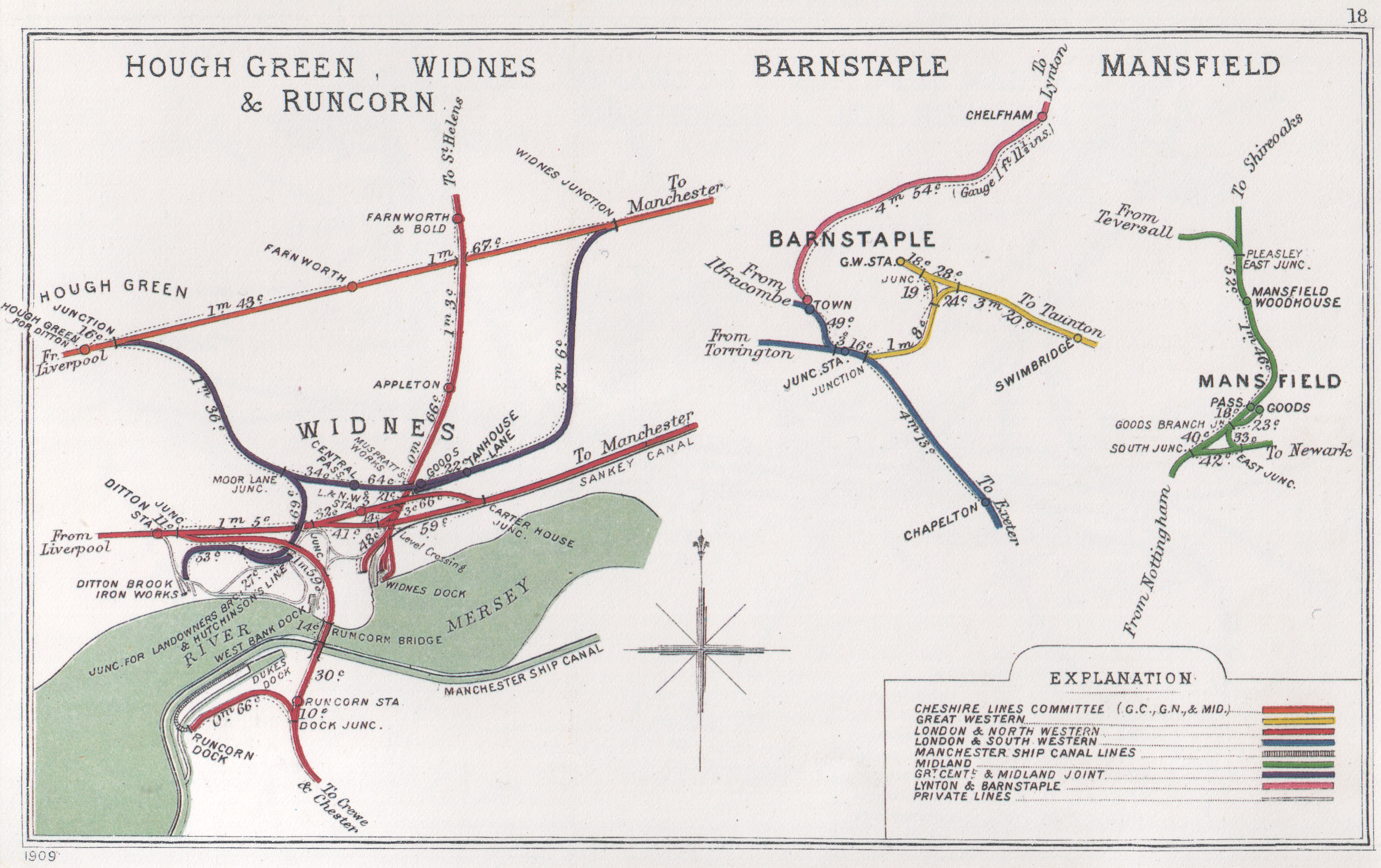
A 1909 Railway Clearing House Junction Diagram showing (left) railways in the vicinity of Widnes Central

In 1874 the uncompleted line was sold to the Manchester, Sheffield and Lincolnshire Railway (MS&LR); and in 1875 it became the joint property of the MS&LR and the Midland Railway - two of the partners in the CLC. The third partner, the Great Northern Railway declined to take part in the project, and so it was not part of the CLC but separately administered by the Sheffield and Midland Railway Companies' Committee. This line opened for goods traffic in 1877. The Widnes line was soon extended westwards to rejoin the CLC near Hough Green, forming what became known as the Widnes Loop. A passenger station on the extension, known as Widnes Central, was opened on 1 August 1879.

The core service at Widnes Central was provided by the trains of the CLC running between Warrington Central and Liverpool Central. In 1922 16 "Down" (towards Liverpool) trains called on Mondays to Saturdays. Nine ran from Warrington Central, two from Manchester Central, one from Tanhouse Lane and two started at Widnes Central itself, all headed for Liverpool Central. One ran from Tanhouse Lane to Garston but by far the most exotic was the 12:15 from London Marylebone to Liverpool Central which called at Widnes at 19:04. "Up" services were similar. Two trains each way called on Sundays.

The station was closed by British Railways on 5 October 1964. as a result of the Beeching Axe. Services had by then declined significantly from their peak levels in pre-grouping days (15 per day each way in 1922) to just five westbound and six eastbound departures on weekdays & Saturdays only. The entire loop line was closed as a through route soon afterwards, though the freight yard at Tanhouse Lane remained in use for cement traffic until 2000 - access was latterly provided by a connection from the ex-LNWR Widnes Deviation Line. The station and approach lines were demolished after closure and no trace remains.

== See also ==
- Widnes railway station
- Widnes South railway station

Preceding station	Disused railways	Following station
Hough Green; Line closed, station open	Sheffield and Midland Railway Companies' Committee; Widnes Loop	Tanhouse Lane; Line and station closed
