= Hough Green railway station =

Railway station in Cheshire, England

Hough Green
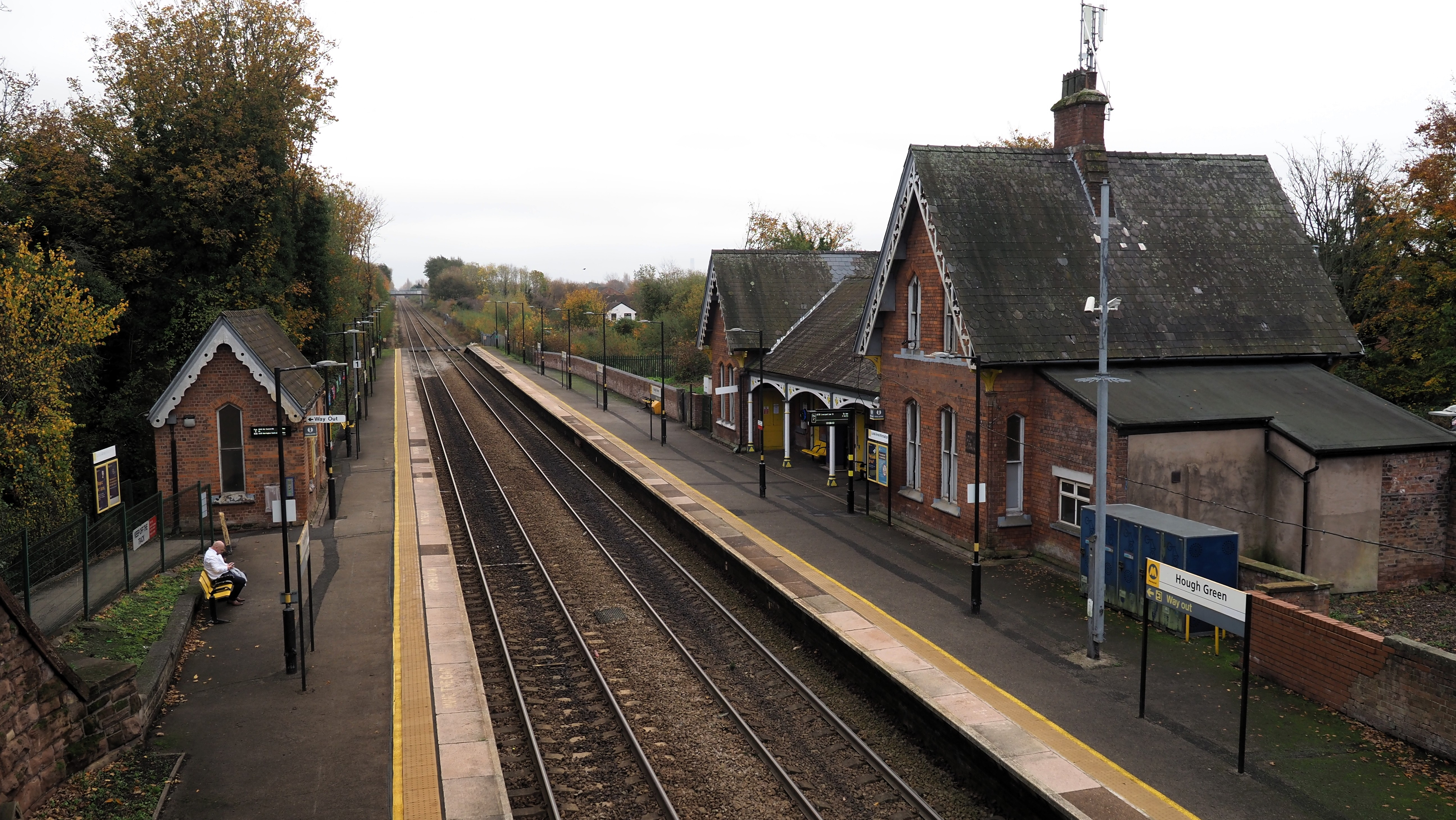
- Hough Green railway station pictured in 2025

General information
- Location: Hough Green, Halton; England
- Coordinates: 53.3725°N 2.775°W
- Grid reference: SJ485864
- Managed by: Northern Trains
- Transit authority: Merseytravel
- Line: Liverpool–Manchester
- Platforms: 2

Other information
- Station code: HGN
- Fare zone: A2
- Classification: DfT category E

History
- Original company: Cheshire Lines Committee
- Pre-grouping: Cheshire Lines Committee
- Post-grouping: Cheshire Lines Committee

Key dates
- 1 May 1874: Station opened as Hough Green
- by 1894: Renamed Hough Green for Ditton
- 6 May 1974: Renamed Hough Green

Passengers
- 2020/21: ▼54,678
- 2021/22: ▲0.166 million
- 2022/23: ▲0.173 million
- 2023/24: ▲0.184 million
- 2024/25: ▲0.193 million
Location
Notes
- Passenger statistics from the Office of Rail and Road

Hough Green railway station is a railway station to the west of Widnes in Halton, Cheshire, England. It is recorded in the National Heritage List for England as a designated Grade II listed building. The station is on the Liverpool–Warrington–Manchester line 10 miles 42 chains (16.9 km) east of Liverpool Lime Street and all trains serving it are operated by Northern Trains.

== History ==
The line through the station site opened for freight on 1 March 1873 and for passengers on 1 August 1873 when the Cheshire Lines Committee opened the line between Glazebrook and Cressington & Grassendale.

The station was opened for passengers and goods on 1 May 1874.

The station became a junction station on 1 July 1879 when Hough Green Junction was opened 15 chains (990 ft; 300 m) to the east, the junction gave access to the Widnes loop line owned by the Sheffield and Midland Railway Companies' Committee, two of the three companies that jointly owned the Cheshire Lines Committee. (Note: This section of the loop line opened for goods on 1 July 1879 and for passengers on 1 August 1879.) (Note: Railways in the United Kingdom are, for historical reasons, measured in miles and chains. A chain is 22 yards (20 m) long, there are 80 chains to the mile.)

The station is located where the line is bridged by Liverpool Road, now the B5178. The main station building is of the "common twin-pavilion type adopted by the CLC" with a larger, two-storey, projecting pavilion forming a house and a smaller single-storey one. Linking them is an entrance hall, ticket office and three-bay iron-arcaded waiting shelter. The building is decorated with elaborately fretted bargeboards. The station was equipped with a carved stone drinking fountain.

It had two platforms, both accessed by steps and a ramp down from the road overbridge, the Liverpool bound platform could also be accessed from the road access to the station building, on either side of two running lines, the Liverpool platform had a siding at its back that was not available for passenger use There was a goods yard to the south of the lines and east of the station. The goods yard was able to accommodate most types of goods, including livestock, it was equipped with a five-ton crane.

By 1894 the station was renamed Hough Green for Ditton and then renamed back to Hough Green on 6 May 1974. The station closed to goods traffic on 6 June 1964. The Widnes loop line closed on 5 October 1964.

== Facilities ==
The station, like other Merseytravel stations, is staffed full-time (06:00 - 00:10 weekdays, 08:40 - 22:40 Sundays). There is a car park outside. Part of the station building is occupied by a taxi firm.

The eastbound platform features the original brick-built waiting room which is still in use. Train running information is provided by automated announcements and digital display screens; there is step-free access only on the westbound side.

== Services ==
Services operate approximately half-hourly (Monday-Saturday daytimes) in each direction, towards Liverpool South Parkway and Liverpool Lime Street to the west and towards Widnes, Warrington Central and Manchester Oxford Road in the east. Services are less frequent in the late evenings and on Sundays, usually every 60 minutes. All services are operated by Northern Trains.

The station is within the Liverpool City Region with tickets issued by Merseytravel.

Preceding station	National Rail	Following station
Halewood	Northern Trains; Liverpool–Manchester line Southern Route (Cheshire Lines)	Widnes
	Disused railways	
Halewood; Line and station open	Sheffield and Midland Railway Companies' Committee; Widnes Loop	Widnes Central; Line and station closed

== See also ==
- Listed buildings in Widnes

== Bibliography ==
- Biddle, Gordon (2003). Britain's Historic Railway Buildings: An Oxford Gazetteer of Structures and Sites. Oxford: Oxford University Press. ISBN 9780198662471.
- Bolger, Paul (1984). An illustrated history of the Cheshire lines committee. Heyday. ISBN 978-0-947562-00-7.
- Clinker, C.R. (October 1978). Clinker's Register of Closed Passenger Stations and Goods Depots in England, Scotland and Wales 1830–1977. Bristol: Avon-Anglia Publications & Services. ISBN 0-905466-19-5. OCLC 5726624.
- Greville, M.D. (1981). Chronology of the Railways of Lancashire and Cheshire (Revised and Combined ed.). Railway & Canal Historical Society. ISBN 0-901461-30-X.
- Jacobs, Gerald (2009). "Railway Mileages". In Bridge, Mike (ed.). TRACKatlas of Mainland Britain. Bradford on Avon: Trackmaps. ISBN 978-0-9549866-5-0.
- Quick, Michael (2022) [2001]. Railway passenger stations in Great Britain: a chronology (PDF). version 5.04. Railway & Canal Historical Society. Archived from the original (PDF) on 25 November 2022.
- The Railway Clearing House (1970) [1904]. The Railway Clearing House Handbook of Railway Stations 1904 (1970 D&C Reprint ed.). Newton Abbot: David & Charles Reprints. ISBN 0-7153-5120-6.
