= Tanhouse Lane railway station =

Former railway station in England

Tanhouse Lane

General information
- Location: Widnes, Halton; England
- Coordinates: 53.36278°N 2.71139°W
- Grid reference: SJ527853
- Platforms: 2

Other information
- Status: Disused

History
- Original company: Sheffield and Midland Railway Companies' Committee
- Pre-grouping: Sheffield and Midland Railway Companies' Committee
- Post-grouping: Sheffield and Midland Railway Companies' Committee

Key dates
- 1 September 1890: Station opened as "Tanhouse"
- Before 1922: Station renamed as "Tanhouse Lane"
- 5 October 1964: Station closed
Location

Tanhouse Lane railway station is a closed station on the former Sheffield and Midland Railway Companies' Committee line, which formed a loop off the Cheshire Lines Committee (CLC) line in the Widnes area between Liverpool Central and Manchester Central. It was opened on 1 September 1890 as "Tanhouse", being changed later to "Tanhouse Lane". It closed on 5 October 1964.

In 1922 13 "Down" (towards Liverpool) trains called on "Week Days" (Mondays to Saturdays). Eight ran from Warrington Central, two from Manchester Central and two started at Tanhouse Lane itself, all headed for Liverpool Central. One ran from Tanhouse Lane to Garston and there was the 12:15 from London Marylebone to Liverpool Central which called at Tanhouse Lane at 18:59. "Up" services were similar.

The station was situated in an industrial area and was popular with workers travelling to and from it. With the rise in the use of the motor car, the station was nominated for closure in the Beeching Report. The final services ran on 3 October 1964, with the first service of the morning to terminate at Tanhouse Lane being a workmen's train; and the station closed from 5 October 1964. The goods yard remained in use until the late 1990s to serve the Blue Circle cement facility on Tanhouse Lane. The area fell into dereliction until a short section of the former Widnes Loop was converted into a heritage feature. A short section of a wall from the station can still be seen.

Preceding station	Disused railways	Following station
Widnes Central; Line and station closed	Sheffield and Midland Railway Companies' Committee; Widnes Loop	Sankey; Line closed, station open
