= Hough Green =

Area of Widnes, Cheshire, England

Coordinates: 53.372°N 2.775°W

- Location within Cheshire
- OS grid reference: SJ4886
- Unitary authority: Halton
- Ceremonial county: Cheshire
- Region: North West
- Country: England
- Sovereign state: United Kingdom
- Post town: Widnes
- Postcode district: WA8
- Dialling code: 0151
- Police: Cheshire
- Fire: Cheshire
- Ambulance: North West
- UK Parliament: Widnes and Halewood

Hough Green is a residential area of the town of Widnes, within the borough of Halton, in the ceremonial county of Cheshire, England. Within the boundaries of the historic county of Lancashire, in 2014 Hough Green became a part of the Liverpool City Region.

Transportation is good with a bus link to the centre of Widnes. Hough Green railway station has rail links to nearby Liverpool, being on the Merseyrail metro, Widnes and further afield to Manchester and Warrington.

== See also ==
- Hough Green railway station
