= Widnes railway station =

Railway station in Farnworth, England

Widnes
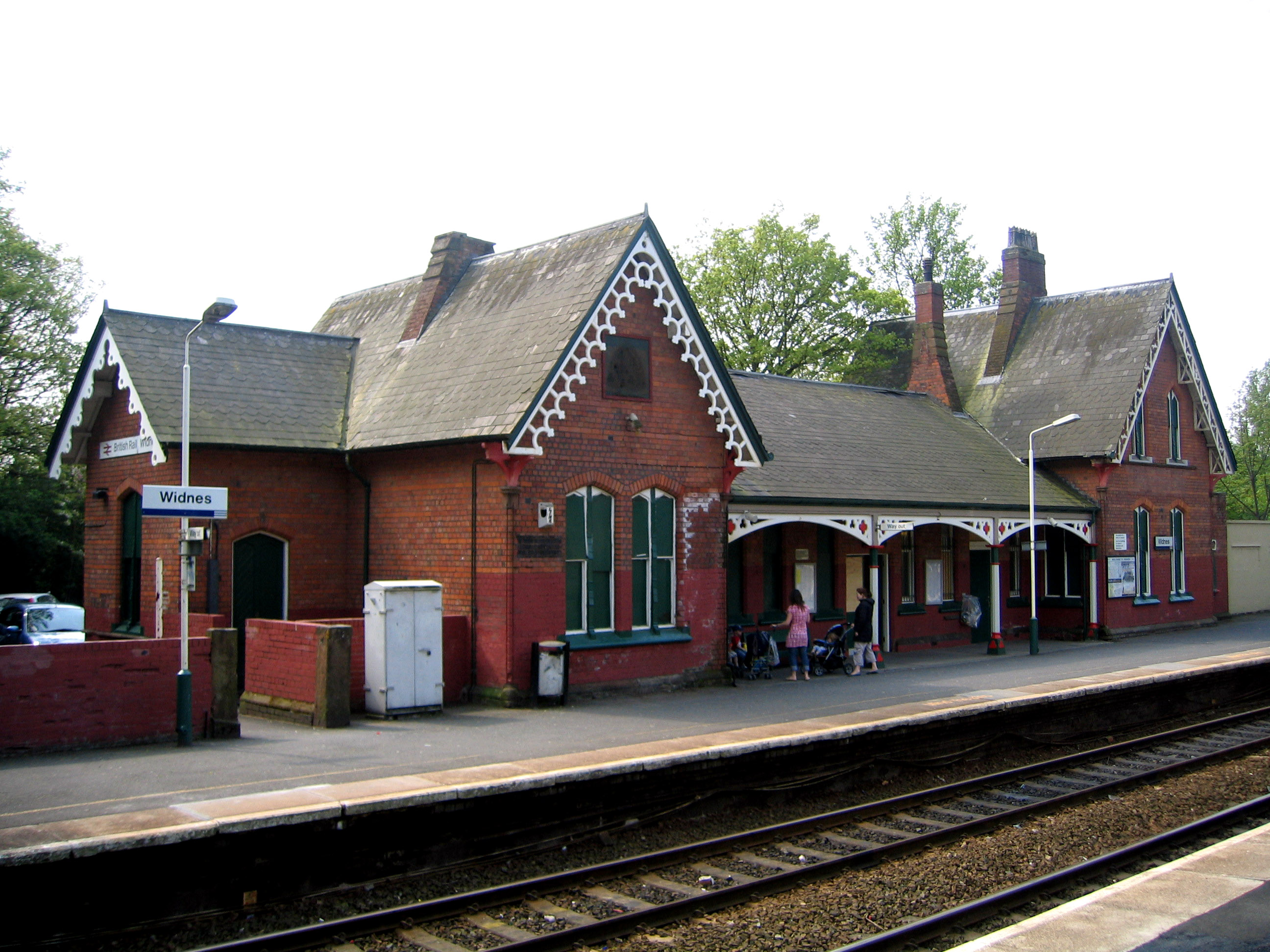
- Widnes railway station in 2007

General information
- Location: Farnworth, Halton; England
- Coordinates: 53.378502°N 2.7336°W
- Grid reference: SJ512871
- Manager: Northern Trains
- Platforms: 2

Other information
- Station code: WID
- Classification: DfT category E

History
- Original company: Cheshire Lines Committee
- Pre-grouping: Cheshire Lines Committee
- Post-grouping: Cheshire Lines Committee

Key dates
- 1 August 1873: Opened as Farnworth for Widnes
- ca. 1914/15: Renamed Farnworth for Appleton
- ca. 1938/39: Renamed Farnworth (Widnes)
- 5 January 1959: Renamed Widnes North
- 6 July 1964: Closed for goods
- 6 May 1968: Renamed Widnes

Passengers
- 2020/21: ▼0.107 million
- 2021/22: ▲0.359 million
- 2022/23: ▲0.377 million
- 2023/24: 0.377 million
- 2024/25: ▲0.428 million
Location
Notes
- Passenger statistics from the Office of Rail and Road

Widnes railway station (formerly Widnes North) is a railway station serving the industrial town of Widnes, Halton, England. It is recorded in the National Heritage List for England as a designated Grade II listed building. The station is operated by Northern Trains.

== History ==
The station opened as Farnworth for Widnes on 1 August 1873 when the Cheshire Lines Committee opened the line between Glazebrook and Cressington & Grassendale to passengers. (Note: The line had opened for freight on 1 March 1873, it was part of the early route from Stockport to Liverpool.) Farnworth being at the time a village over 1 mile (1.6 km) north of Widnes, but has since been absorbed to become a northern suburb of the town.

The station is located where the line is bridged by Birchfield Road, now the B5419. The main station building is of the "common twin-pavilion type adopted by the CLC" with a larger, two-storey, projecting pavilion forming a house and a smaller single-storey one. Linking them is an entrance hall, ticket office and three-bay iron-arcaded waiting shelter. The building is decorated with elaborately fretted bargeboards. The station was equipped with a carved stone drinking fountain. Opposite the main building was a matching waiting shelter, this was replaced sometime after 1961 with a steel and glass type shelter.

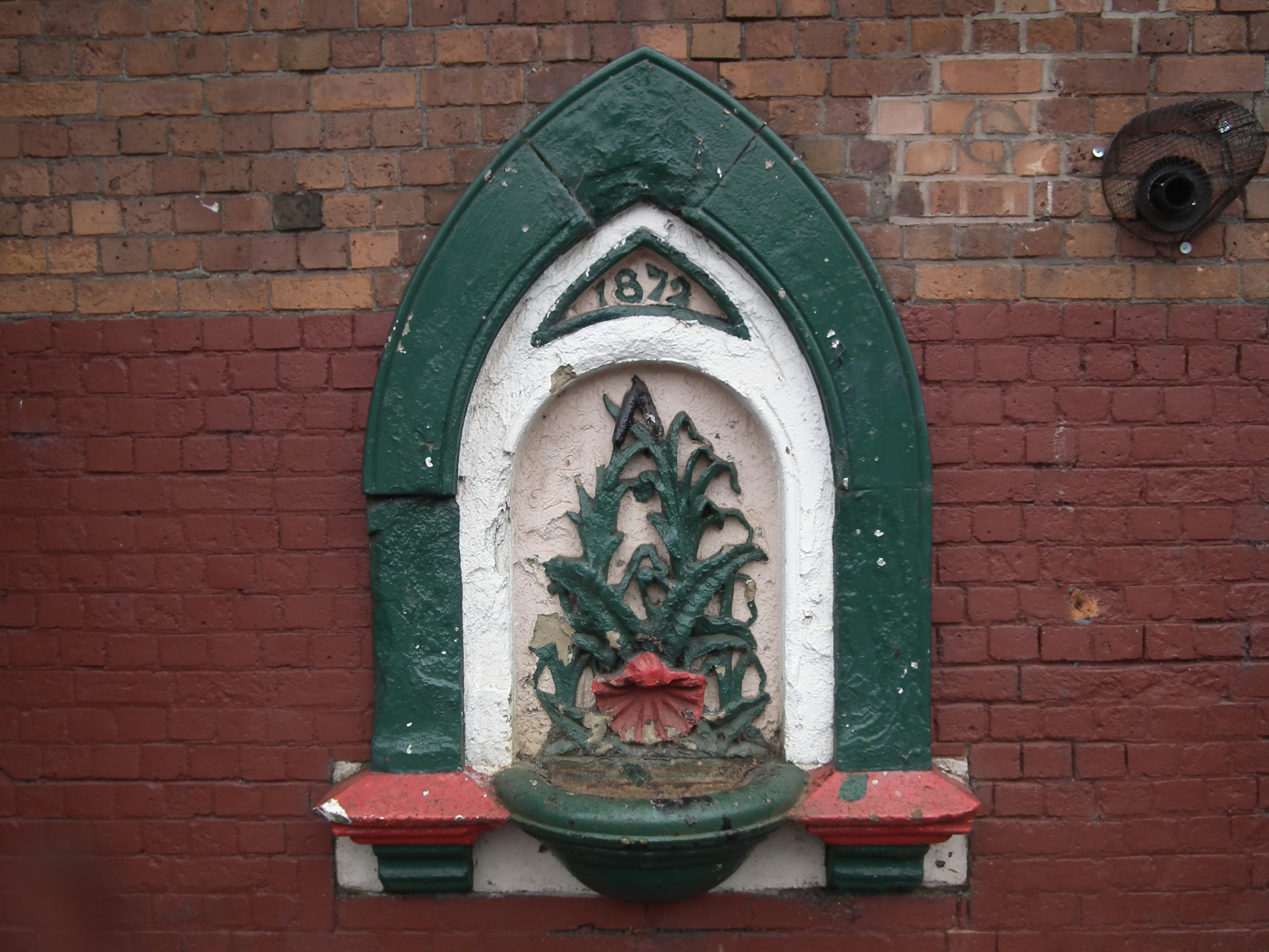
Disused and weather-worn fountain at Widnes station, 2010

It had two platforms, both accessed by steps down from the road overbridge (Note: The steps were later removed on the Manchester bound platform and a ramp installed.) on either side of two running lines. The platforms had sidings at their back, the one to the north equipped with a cattle pen. There was a goods yard and shed to the north of the lines and west of the station. The goods yard, which was equipped with a five-ton crane, was able to accommodate most types of goods .

In about 1914/15 the station was renamed Farnworth for Appleton and then Farnworth (Widnes) around 1938/39. The station was renamed Widnes North on 5 January 1959, the former LN&WR station becoming Widnes South at this time and finally Widnes on 6 May 1968 after Widnes Central and Widnes South had closed.

The station closed to goods traffic on 6 July 1964 and the goods yard demolished.

== "Homeward Bound" by Paul Simon ==
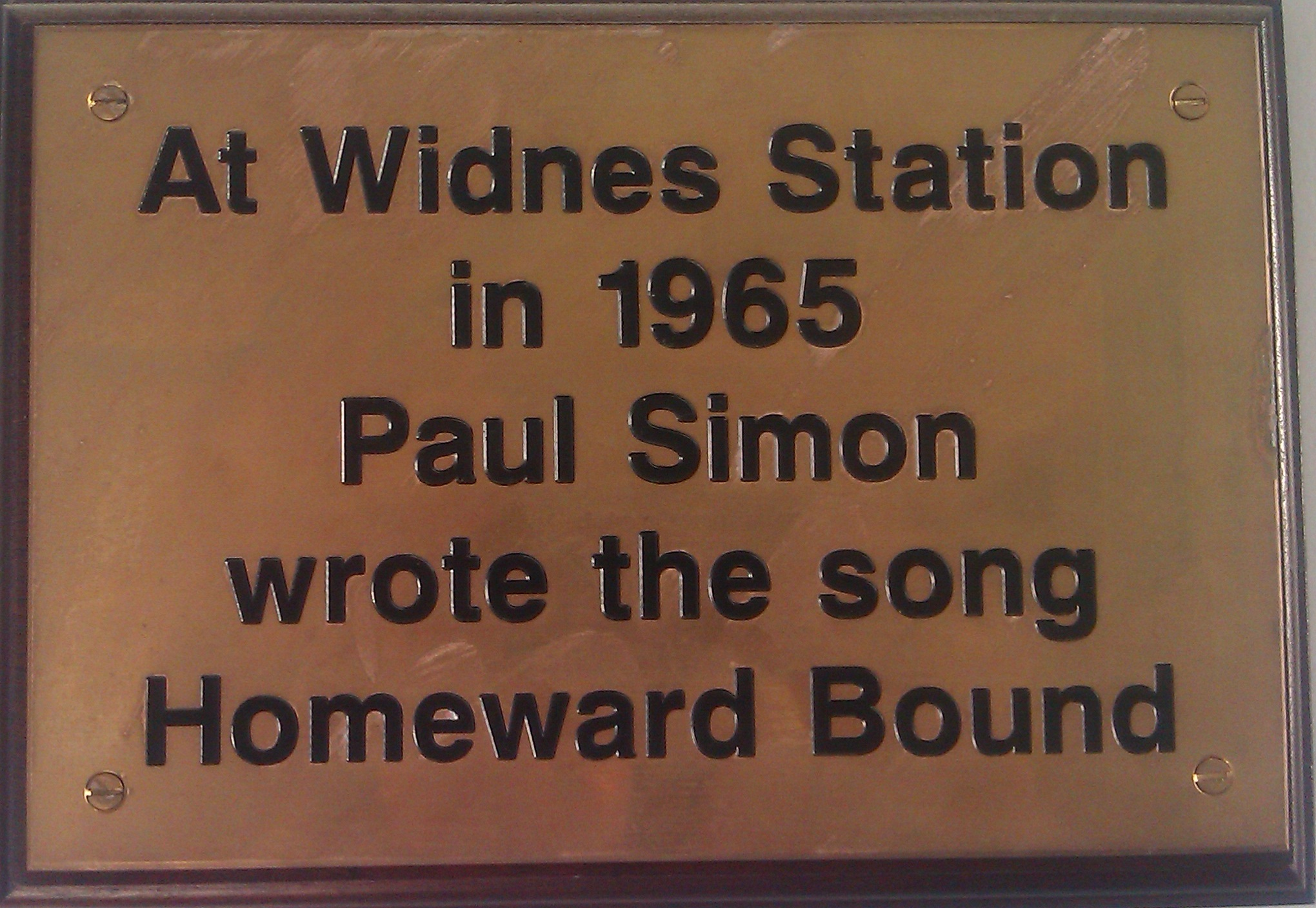
Plaque

Widnes railway station is generally believed to be where Paul Simon composed the song "Homeward Bound", although some think it more likely that it was Ditton railway station, in order to get to London by train. Simon is quoted as saying "[i]f you'd ever seen Widnes, then you'd know why I was keen to get back to London as quickly as possible." However, rather than actually being 'homeward bound' (Simon temporarily lived in London at the time), he was on tour and had just performed at local DJ Geoff Speed's Howff Folk Club and was reportedly dropped off at Widnes station by him. Simon was not headed for London but for Humberside and Widnes station would have been the logical choice of station to travel there.

== Facilities ==
A footbridge now connects the two platforms. The station is staffed, but only until early afternoon. There is a car park outside. The station was refurbished in 2009 and as of 2010 houses a station shop and a beauty parlour, though there are still no toilet or waiting facilities for passengers other than the already existent shelter on the Manchester-bound platform. The platforms and footbridge have recently been refurbished. A ticket machine has been installed on both platforms. Digital display screens and automated announcements provide train running information.

The ticket office is staffed on a part-time basis between the hours of 07:00 and 14:25 Mon-Sat. Step free access is available to both platforms.

== Services ==
There is an hourly local service (operated by Northern Trains) in each direction calling here, running eastbound to Warrington Central and west to Liverpool Lime Street. This stops at most stations en-route to Liverpool and at Warrington West before terminating at Warrington Central. A small number of peak and late evening trains between Liverpool and Manchester Oxford Road also stop here. On Sundays, the service is hourly to Liverpool and Manchester Oxford Road.

An express service also operates hourly in each direction (run by East Midlands Railway), from Liverpool to Manchester Piccadilly, Sheffield, Nottingham and Norwich. The journey time on most of these trains to Manchester is 30 minutes, whilst Liverpool can be reached in 18 minutes.

== See also ==
- Listed buildings in Widnes

== Bibliography ==
- Biddle, Gordon (2003). Britain's Historic Railway Buildings: An Oxford Gazetteer of Structures and Sites. Oxford: Oxford University Press. ISBN 9780198662471.
- Bolger, Paul (1984). An illustrated history of the Cheshire lines committee. Heyday. ISBN 978-0-947562-00-7.
- Clinker, C.R. (October 1978). Clinker's Register of Closed Passenger Stations and Goods Depots in England, Scotland and Wales 1830–1977. Bristol: Avon-Anglia Publications & Services. ISBN 0-905466-19-5. OCLC 5726624.
- Pixton, Bob (1996). Widnes and St Helens railways. Stroud: Chalford. ISBN 0-7524-0751-1. OCLC 877182742.
- Pixton, Bob (April 2007). Liverpool and Manchester 2: Cheshire Lines. Kestrel Railway Books. ISBN 978-1-905505-03-6.
- Quick, Michael (2022) [2001]. Railway passenger stations in Great Britain: a chronology (PDF). version 5.04. Railway & Canal Historical Society. Archived from the original (PDF) on 25 November 2022.
- The Railway Clearing House (1970) [1904]. The Railway Clearing House Handbook of Railway Stations 1904 (1970 D&C Reprint ed.). Newton Abbot: David & Charles Reprints. ISBN 0-7153-5120-6.

Preceding station	National Rail	Following station
Hough Green	Northern Trains; Manchester to Liverpool Line	Warrington West
Hough Green	Northern Trains; Manchester to Liverpool Line	Warrington Central
Hough Green	Northern Trains; Manchester to Liverpool Line	Sankey for Penketh
Liverpool South Parkway	East Midlands Railway; Liverpool - Norwich	Warrington Central
Hunts Cross	East Midlands Railway; Liverpool - Norwich	Warrington Central
