= Widnes South railway station =

Former railway station in England

Widnes South

General information
- Location: Widnes, Halton; England
- Coordinates: 53.3583°N 2.7339°W
- Grid reference: SJ512848
- Platforms: 2

Other information
- Status: Disused

History
- Original company: London and North Western Railway
- Pre-grouping: London and North Western Railway
- Post-grouping: London Midland and Scottish Railway; London Midland Region of British Railways

Key dates
- 1 March 1870: Opened as Widnes
- 5 January 1959: Renamed Widnes South
- 10 September 1962: Closed to Passengers
- 31 March 1969: Closed completely
Location

Widnes South railway station was located in the town of Widnes in Cheshire, England on the east side of Victoria Road. It was built by the London and North Western Railway and situated on their Widnes Deviation Line, opening to passengers and goods in March 1870. This route was constructed by the LNWR to improve traffic flow on the busy Ditton Junction to Warrington Bank Quay Low Level and Manchester (the former Garston and Warrington Railway, later renamed as the St Helens Railway). It replaced an earlier station on the G&WR line located slightly further south and also had a connection to the St Helens and Runcorn Gap Railway, providing access towards the north.

Passenger services were primarily local in nature and provided by Liverpool Lime Street to Warrington Bank Quay & Manchester Oxford Road stopping trains and the Ditton Dodger between Ditton and St Helens Central - this pattern continued after the 1923 Grouping brought the route under the control of the London, Midland & Scottish Railway and the subsequent nationalisation of the UK railway network in January 1948. The line was also heavily used by freight, with the LNWR treating it as a key artery for through east–west traffic.

St Helens trains were withdrawn by the British Transport Commission in June 1951 – service levels on the route having been cut prior to World War II and never fully restored afterwards. The station was subsequently renamed as Widnes South by BR in January 1959 to differentiate it from the neighbouring Widnes Central station on the former Manchester, Sheffield and Lincolnshire Railway & Midland Railway Joint Widnes Loop line and "North" (now known simply as Widnes) on the Cheshire Lines Committee main line. It then closed to regular passenger traffic on 10 September 1962 with the withdrawal of services on the Ditton to Manchester via Warrington route. Special excursions run in conjunction with Widnes rugby league club home matches continued to call until 1965, whilst the goods depot remained open until 1969.

By December 2015 the route through the station was still used by freight traffic, the main flow being block coal trains to and from the power station at Fiddlers Ferry. The station buildings and one platform had been demolished, though the westbound platform still remained intact, albeit overgrown. The connection towards St Helens was closed in 1982 (along with the station signal box), whilst the main line now terminates at Arpley yard, near Warrington Bank Quay station. The section east of Warrington towards Manchester and Stockport was closed in 1985.

In January 2016 the last remains of the station were demolished. Contractors began work at the beginning of the month; they demolished the remains of the platforms, filled in the subway and landscaped the resulting embankment sides.

| Preceding station | Disused railways | Following station |
|---|---|---|
| Ditton Mill; Line open, station closed | LNWR; St Helens Railway | Ann Street Halt; Line and station closed |
| Ditton Mill; Line open, station closed | LNWR; St Helens Railway | Cuerdley; Line open, station closed |
