= Sheffield and Midland Railway Companies' Committee =

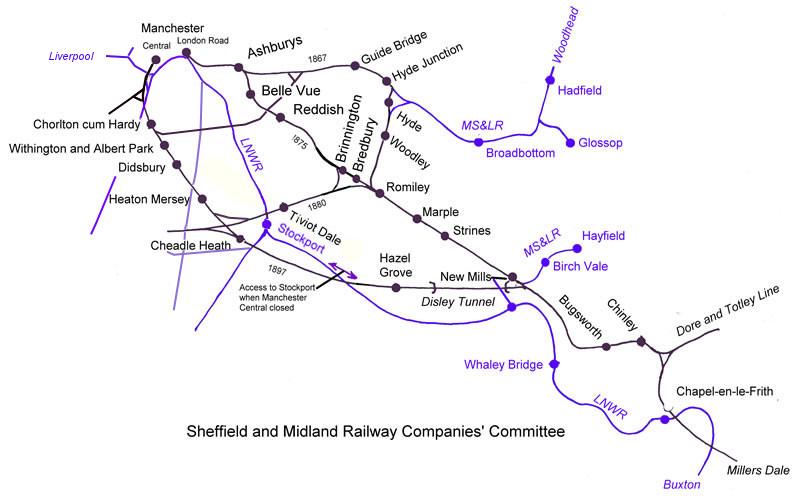
Sketch map of Midland Railway lines into Manchester

The Sheffield and Midland Railway Companies' Committee was incorporated by the Manchester, Sheffield and Lincolnshire Railway and Midland Railway Companies (Joint Lines) Act 1869 (32 & 33 Vict. c. xxv) as a joint venture between the Midland Railway and the Manchester, Sheffield and Lincolnshire Railway.

List of stations served
- For stations from Ambergate see Manchester, Buxton, Matlock and Midlands Junction Railway
  - Millers Dale
  - Peak Forest
  - Chinley
  - Buxworth
  - New Mills
  - Strines
  - Marple
  - Romiley
  - Woodley
  - Hyde Central
  - Hyde Junction
  - Guide Bridge
  - Ashburys
- 1875: New route from Romiley
  - Bredbury
  - Brinnington
  - Reddish
  - Belle Vue
  - Manchester London Road (now Piccadilly)
- also via L&YR to
  - Ardwick (new)
  - Manchester Victoria
- 1879: **The Widnes Loop
  - Widnes Central
  - Tanhouse Lane from 1890
- 1880: From Romiley to Heaton Mersey
  - Stockport Teviot Dale [sic]
- 1897: Direct line from Chinley
  - Disley Tunnel
  - Hazel Grove South
  - Cheadle Heath
  - Heaton Mersey
  - Didsbury
  - Withington and Albert Park
  - Chorlton cum Hardy
  - Manchester Central

== Origins ==
For many years the Midland had been wishing to extend its line from London St Pancras to Manchester, via Derby and the Manchester, Buxton, Matlock and Midlands Junction Railway.

It was thwarted by the London and North Western Railway which already had a line from Manchester to London, via Birmingham and had built a branch line to Buxton. Meanwhile, The Great Northern Railway was also averse to more competition in the area, and the Manchester, Sheffield and Lincolnshire Railway (MS&LR) wished to expand southwards from its main line from Manchester, via Penistone, to Sheffield. The three joined forces in a series of tripartite agreements, which not being sanctioned by Parliament, were of doubtful legality.

However James Allport, with some other Midland Railway directors, met some members of the MS&LR board while surveying the area. Allport had worked for the MS&LR and was familiar with the state of their finances. Since it was clear that the Midland Railway was determined to enter Manchester, the MS&LR agreed to a joint scheme. The Midland Railway would take its line from Millers Dale as far as New Mills, and the MS&LR would build its branch from Hyde on its main line to Hayfield via New Mills.

=== Manchester and Stockport Railway ===
Manchester and Stockport Railway Act 1866
- Act of Parliament
- Parliament of the United Kingdom
- Long title: An Act for making a Railway from Manchester to Stockport.
- Citation: 29 & 30 Vict. c. ccvii

Dates
- Royal assent: 16 July 1866

Text of statute as originally enacted

On 16 July 1866 the Manchester and Stockport Railway was incorporated by the Manchester and Stockport Railway Act 1866 (29 & 30 Vict. c. ccvii), sponsored by the MS&LR. This sanctioned a line of 4 1/2 miles from Ashburys to Brinnington Junction on the Stockport and Woodley Junction Railway, with a branch of 2 3/4 miles from Reddish junction to Romiley on the New Mills line. It was conceived chiefly to give the Midland Railway access into Manchester, and it was intended that the Midland would adopt joint ownership of the line, as well as the existing line between Hyde Junction and New Mills. Midland trains started to use London Road from 1 February 1867.

The Railways herein-before referred to and authorized by this Act are:

- A Railway (No. 1.) of Four Miles Six Furlongs and Four Chains or thereabouts in Length, commencing by a Junction with the Main Line of the Manchester, Sheffield, and Lincolnshire Railway at a Point Four Chains or thereabouts, measured along that Railway Eastward from the Centre of the Bridge which carries it over Pottery Lane in the Township of Openshaw in the Parish of Manchester, and terminating in the Township of Brinnington in the Parish of Stockport by a Junction with the Stockport and Woodley Junction Railway at a Point Fourteen Chains or thereabouts, measured along the last-named Railway North-eastward from the North-eastwardly Side of Henry Street in Portwood in the Borough and Parish of Stockport aforesaid:
- A Railway (No. 2.) of Two Miles and Five Furlongs or thereabouts in Length, commencing by a Junction with the intended Railway No. 1. at a Point in the Township of Brinnington in the Parish of Stockport Nine Chains or thereabouts distant from-the Weir, across the River Tame, next above and belonging to the Print and Bleach Works known as Reddish Mills, and terminating by a Junction with the Newton and Compstall Branch of the Manchester, Sheffield, and Lincolnshire Railway at a Point on that Branch Railway Eight Chains or thereabouts, measured along the same Branch Railway North-westward from the Centre of the Bridge which carries the same Branch Railway over the public Carriage Road leading from Romiley to Compstall.

— Section 5, Manchester and Stockport Railway Act 1866 (29 & 30 Vict. c. ccvii)

Manchester, Sheffield and Lincolnshire Railway and Midland Railway Companies (Joint Lines) Act 1869
- Act of Parliament
- Parliament of the United Kingdom
- Long title: An Act for dissolving the Manchester and Stockport Railway Company, and transferring their undertaking to the Manchester, Sheffield, and Lincolnshire and Midland Railway Companies jointly; and for empowering the two last-mentioned companies jointly to make a short branch railway out of the Stockport and Woodley Junction Railway; and for authorizing a joint ownership by those two companies of the Newton and Compstall Railway and the Marple New Mills and Hayfield Junction Railway; and for granting running powers to the Midland Railway Company over parts of the Manchester, Sheffield, and Lincolnshire Railway; and for other purposes.
- Citation: 32 & 33 Vict. c. xxv

Dates
- Royal assent: 24 June 1869

Text of statute as originally enacted

On 24 June 1869 the Manchester, Sheffield and Lincolnshire Railway and Midland Railway Companies (Joint Lines) Act 1869 (32 & 33 Vict. c. xxv) vested the still unfinished Manchester and Stockport Railway, and the line from Hyde to New Mills, and the branch from New Mills to Hayfield, jointly in the MS&LR and the Midland Railway, from then onwards known as the Sheffield and Midland Committee Lines.

== Opening ==
This agreement, including the Sheffield and Midland Railway Companies' Committee, was formalised in the Manchester, Sheffield, and Lincolnshire Railway (Additional Powers) Act 1872 (35 & 36 Vict. c. clxxviii) of 6 August 1872

In 1867 the line had opened into Manchester Store Street, by then renamed London Road (now Piccadilly), which the MS&LR shared with the LNWR. However, the committee, seeking a more direct route, opened a line through Bredbury and Reddish in 1875.

Increasing friction with LNWR led to the Cheshire Lines Committee being formed and when Manchester Central opened in 1880 trains were diverted at Romiley through Stockport Teviot Dale (as it was originally spelt).

This entailed another new line, the Manchester South District Railway, from Heaton Mersey to Chorlton-cum-Hardy. Although incorporated in 1873, there was a lack of interest on the part of the MS&LR and the GNR (the Midland's partners in the CLC). It was therefore taken under the wing of the Sheffield and Midland Committee, with the Midland taking overall control in 1877. The line finally opened in 1880.

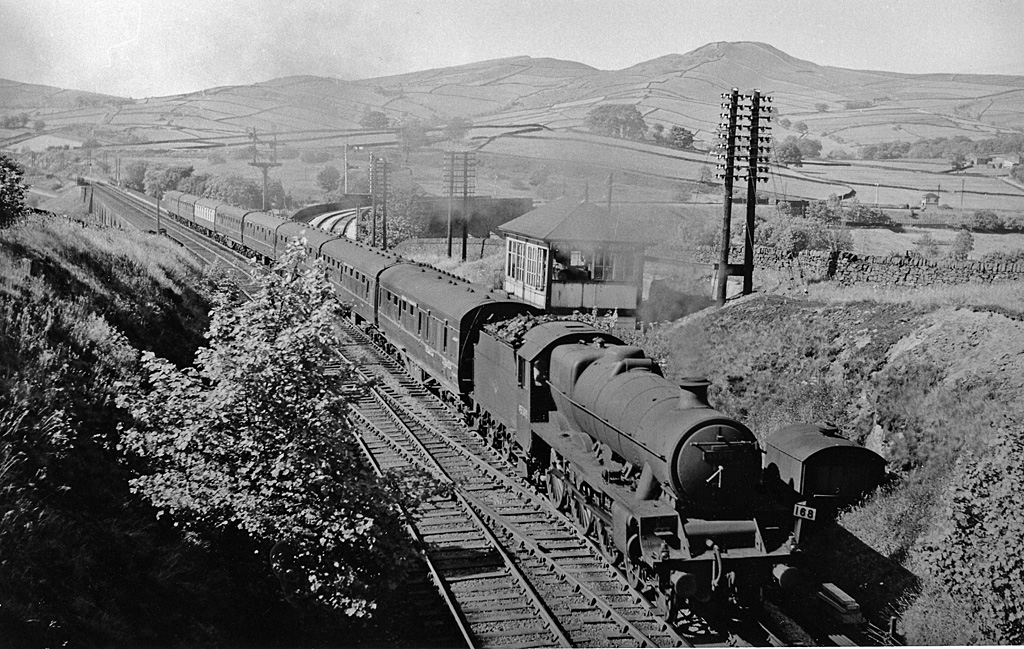
Manchester Central - London St Pancras express at Chinley South Junction in 1957

However, by the end of the century congestion around Stockport had increased, and with speed limits, gradients and curves, the Midland looked for yet another route. The New Mills and Heaton Mersey Railway was authorised by the Midland Railway Act 1897 (60 & 61 Vict. c. clxxxiii), running from New Mills South Junction, between New Mills and Buxworth through Disley Tunnel.

== Modern times ==
The earlier lines remain busy as the Hope Valley Line, as does that from New Mills through Disley Tunnel, where it branches to the old LNWR line from Buxton at Hazel Grove railway station into Stockport. However the stations from Hazel Grove to Manchester Central closed in 1967 and have practically disappeared, although the section of the railway between Didsbury and Manchester Central has reopened as a Metrolink line. There are hopes that this will extend further in the future through Heaton Mersey, and then leaving the alignment and heading into Stockport town centre.

It became a corporate body, renamed the Great Central and Midland Joint Committee, on 22 July 1904. It was vested in the British Transport Commission under Transport Act 1947.

== See also ==
- Great Central and Midland Joint Railway
