= Cuerdley railway station =

Former railway station in England

Cuerdley

General information
- Location: Widnes, Halton, Cheshire; England
- Coordinates: 53.361743°N 2.706037°W
- Grid reference: SJ531852
- Platforms: 2 (probable)

Other information
- Status: Disused

History
- Original company: St Helens and Runcorn Gap Railway

Key dates
- 1856: opened
- 5 January 1858: Ordered to be closed
Location

One source gives Cuerdley railway station as being on what is now the southeastern edge of Widnes, England, stating that it was located near the then bone works which the 1849 OS Map shows as at the convergence of Moss Lane, the railway, the Sankey Canal, a creek and the north bank of the tidal River Mersey. Of these only Moss Lane is no longer readily identifiable on a modern OS Map. The authoritative Disused Stations website does not include an article on Cuerdley station, however, it does repeatedly use a map which places Cuerdley station some distance nearer Warrington. This is corroborated by the Engineer's Line Reference (ELR) database which gives Cuerdley station as 1 mile 10 chains from Fiddlers Ferry and Penketh station and 1 mile 31 chains from Carterhouse Junction. Furthermore, the ELR data gives the station site as only 31 chains west of the modern-day junction for Fiddlers Ferry Power station.

The station was reluctantly built and opened by the St Helens and Runcorn Gap Railway in response to persistent local lobbying. Receipts were as low as the company feared, so they announced the decision to close the station on 5 January 1858. Furthermore, they added a policy that to remain open any station had to generate receipts of £3 per week.

The station was demolished and no trace remains.

Preceding station	Disused railways	Following station
Fidlers Ferry & Penketh	St Helens Canal and Railway	Runcorn Gap (2nd)
