= Sankey Bridges =

Coordinates: 53°23′10″N 2°37′32″W

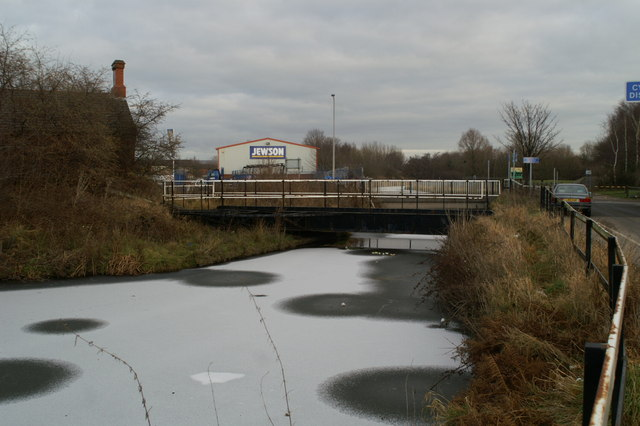
Canal bridges at Sankey Bridges

Sankey Bridges is part of the Parish of St Barnabas in Warrington, a unitary authority in the north-west of England. Located on the turnpike road between Warrington, Prescot and Liverpool over the Sankey Brook, which was the boundary of Great Sankey and The County Borough of Warrington, it became home to many industries after the opening of the Sankey Canal, the first wholly artificial canal built in England during the Industrial Revolution.

When opened, the canal entered the River Mersey through a set of locks situated here, although the canal was subsequently extended to locks further downstream, at Fiddlers Ferry and Runcorn Gap. There are bridges over the canal from where the community takes its name.

There is a community centre for the area.

There is an adjacent disused railway station Sankey Bridges railway station.
