= Ditton railway station =

Disused railway station in Cheshire, England

Coordinates: 53.3563°N 2.7707°W

Ditton
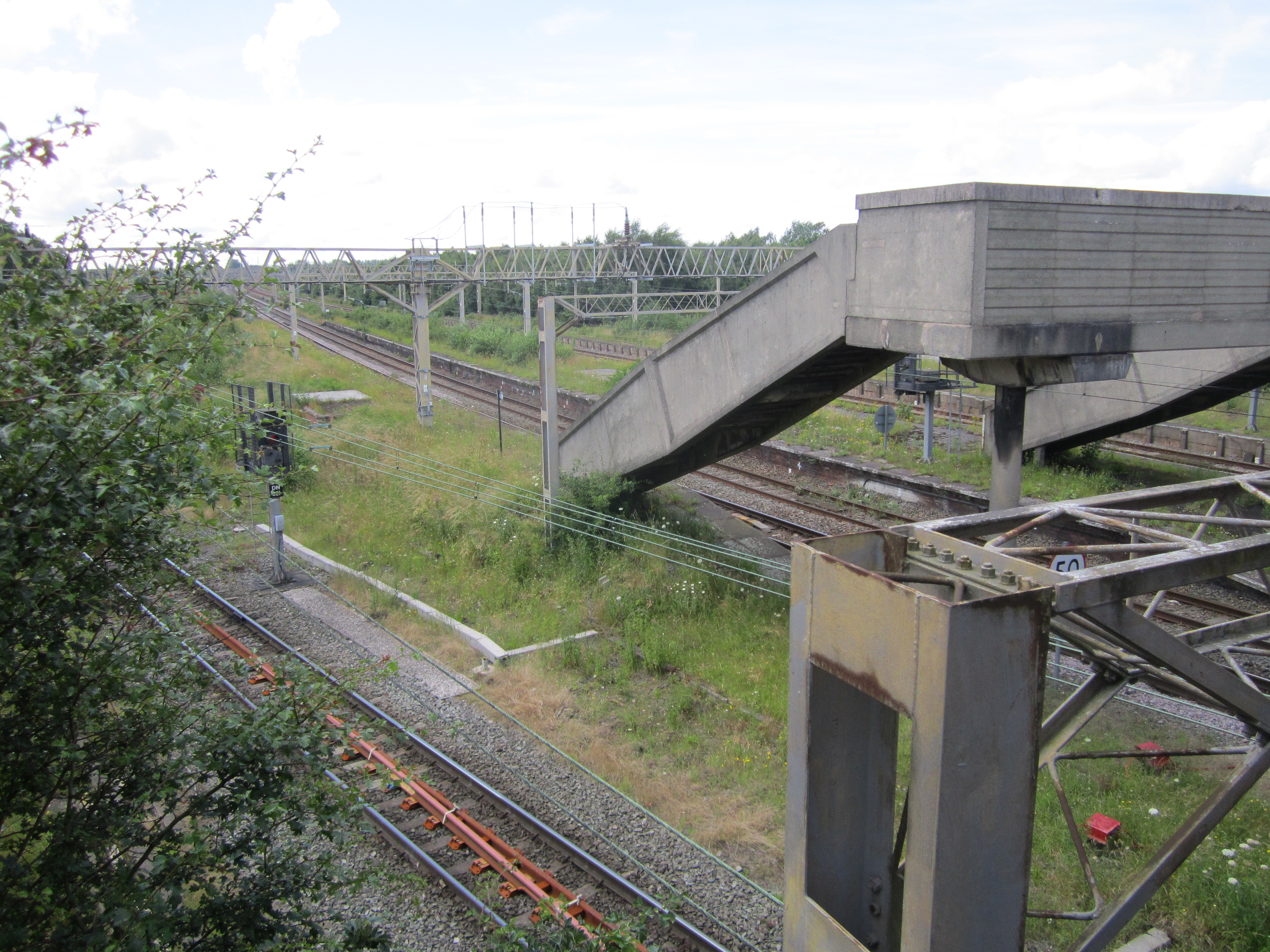
- The disused station seen in 2012

General information
- Location: Ditton, Halton, Cheshire; England
- Grid reference: SJ487846
- Platforms: 5

Other information
- Status: Disused

History
- Pre-grouping: London & North Western Railway
- Post-grouping: London, Midland and Scottish Railway; London Midland Region of British Railways; Railtrack

Key dates
- 1 May 1871: New station opened as Ditton Junction, replacing Ditton Mill
- 7 May 1973: Renamed (Ditton)
- 29 May 1994: Closed
Location

Ditton railway station, originally Ditton Junction, was a railway station which served the Ditton area of Widnes in Cheshire, England. It was located on Hale Road on the border between Ditton and Halebank.

== History ==
The station opened in 1871 on the London-Liverpool line. It replaced an earlier station named Ditton Mill which was inconveniently located off the then new main line some 230 yards (210 m) to the east.

On 17 September 1912, 15 people were killed when the 17:30 train from Chester derailed while crossing from the fast to the slow line at speed.

The station was rebuilt between 1960-61 at a cost of £48,500 (equivalent to £1,363,600 in 2023).

Ditton closed to passengers on 29 May 1994 and the station buildings were demolished in 2005.

=== Paul Simon ===
Ditton railway station is one of two stations where Paul Simon may have composed the song "Homeward Bound", the other being Widnes railway station. It is uncertain exactly where the song was written. In an interview with Paul Zollo for SongTalk Magazine, Art Garfunkel says that Simon wrote the song in a train station "around Manchester" while in an earlier interview for Playboy Magazine Simon himself mentioned the train station was at Liverpool. It is likely, however, that it was written at Widnes station during a long wait for a train, as Simon was still on tour and travelling to a gig in Humberside from Widnes, and was reportedly dropped off at Widnes station by the owner of the club where he had been playing. A plaque commemorating this claim to fame is displayed on the Liverpool-bound platform of Widnes railway station. Simon is quoted as saying "if you'd ever seen Widnes, then you'd know why I was keen to get back to London as quickly as possible."

=== Closure ===
The station was the first to be closed by Railtrack following the privatisation of British Rail in 1994. Passenger numbers declined during the 1960s and 1970s with the steady withdrawal of services. The Ditton Dodger to St Helens Central was the first withdrawal in 1951, followed by services to Manchester Oxford Road in 1962 and to North Wales via the North Wales Coast Line and Chester in 1975. The station was left with an hourly shuttle between Crewe and Liverpool. By the late 1980s even this service had begun to omit Ditton from its schedule and dwindling passenger numbers eventually led to its closure.

As of 2023 the platforms survive and can easily be seen from passing trains, and the site of the station buildings is visible from the road, marked by the more modern brickwork of the bridge parapet.

== Future ==
Halton Borough Council has protected the site of the station as well as the Halton Curve from development prejudicial to their reuse as part of the rail network; the council notes that "there is an opportunity for the re-opening of this station, particularly with the possible increase in patronage from major industrial, commercial and housing developments in the area. It may be possible to use the station as a park and ride facility." The alignment of the "Shell Green Route" which linked Ditton with Widnes South and Warrington is also protected.

Liverpool City Region Mayor, Steve Rotheram, stated in an interview in July 2017 that re-opening the station was one of the several options that had been outlined in the Liverpool City Region's Long Term Rail Strategy. The success of the plan depended heavily upon the re-opening of the Halton Curve.

In February 2019 it was announced that Merseytravel and consultant company Arup had been conducting feasibility studies into the reopening of the station. Initial estimates put the cost of reopening the station at an estimated £10 million.

Preceding station	Disused railways	Following station
Allerton	Regional Railways; Weaver Junction and Liverpool Line	Runcorn
Hale Bank	London and North Western Railway; St Helens Railway	Widnes South
Hale Bank	London and North Western Railway	Runcorn
