= St Helens and Runcorn Gap Railway =

Former railway line in England

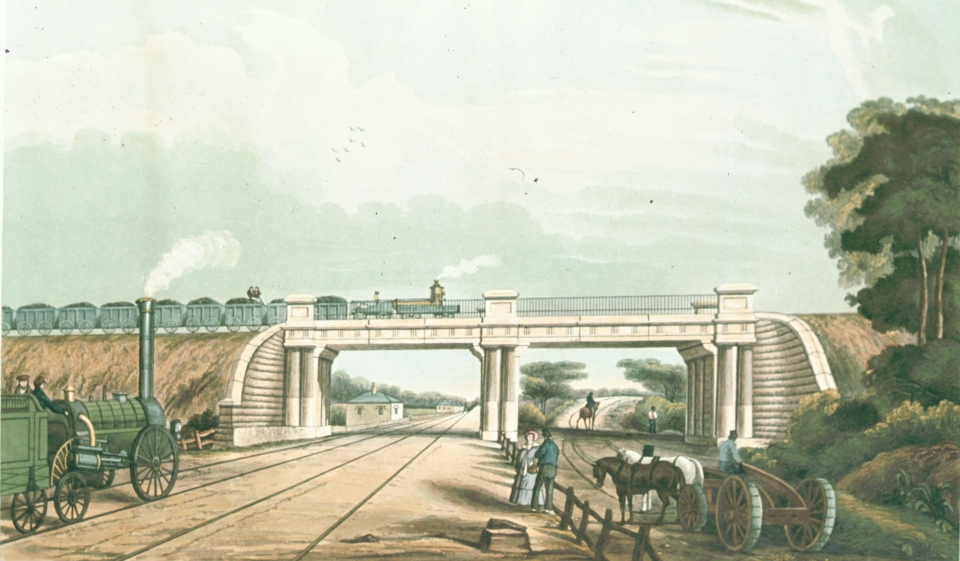
- 1832 view of the bridge over the Liverpool and Manchester Railway, the first bridge of one railway over another in the world.

Overview
- Locale: Cheshire; Merseyside; North West England

Technical
- Track gauge: 1,435 mm (4 ft 8 1/2 in) standard gauge

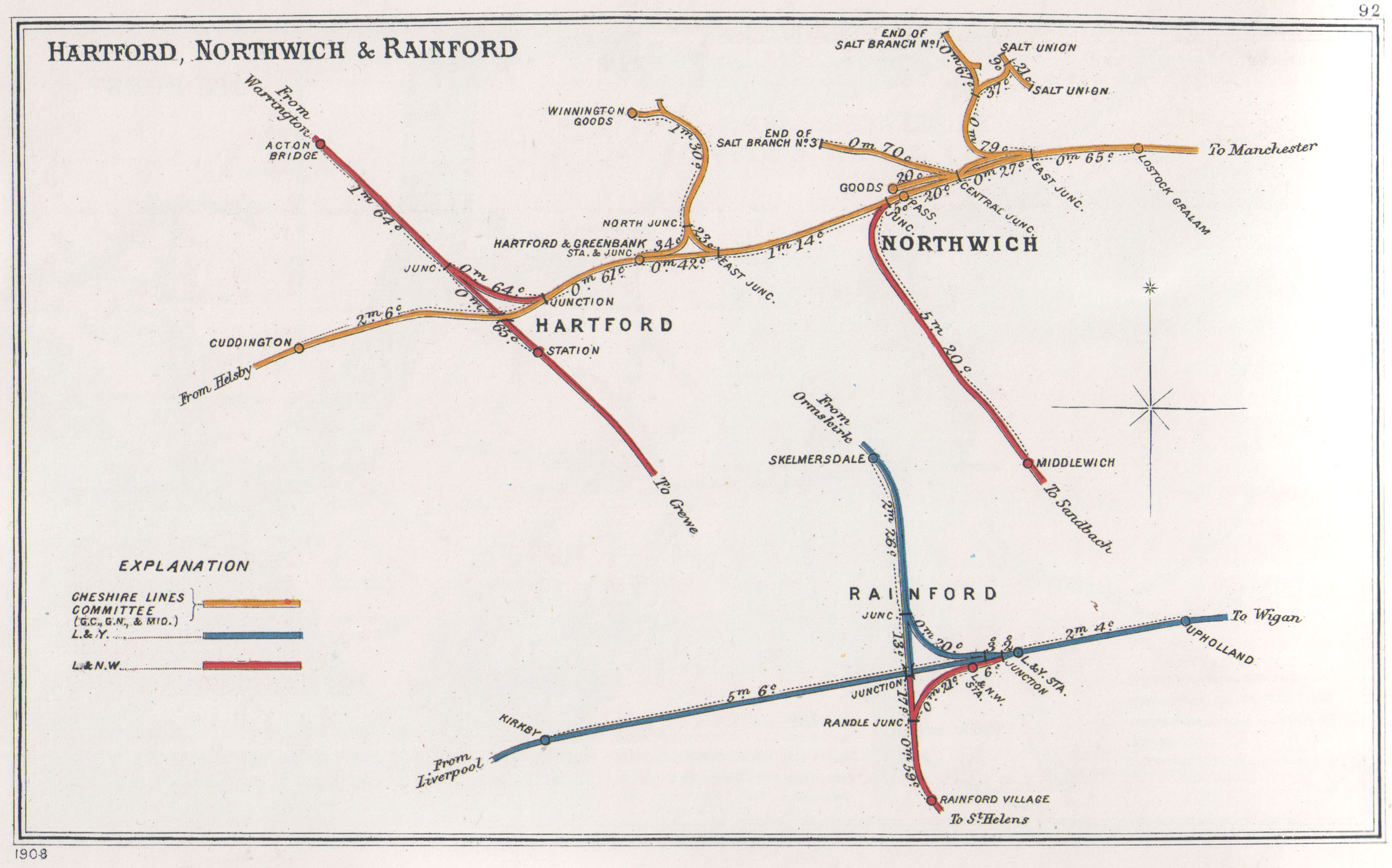
Details of the line at Rainford, 1908 (lower)

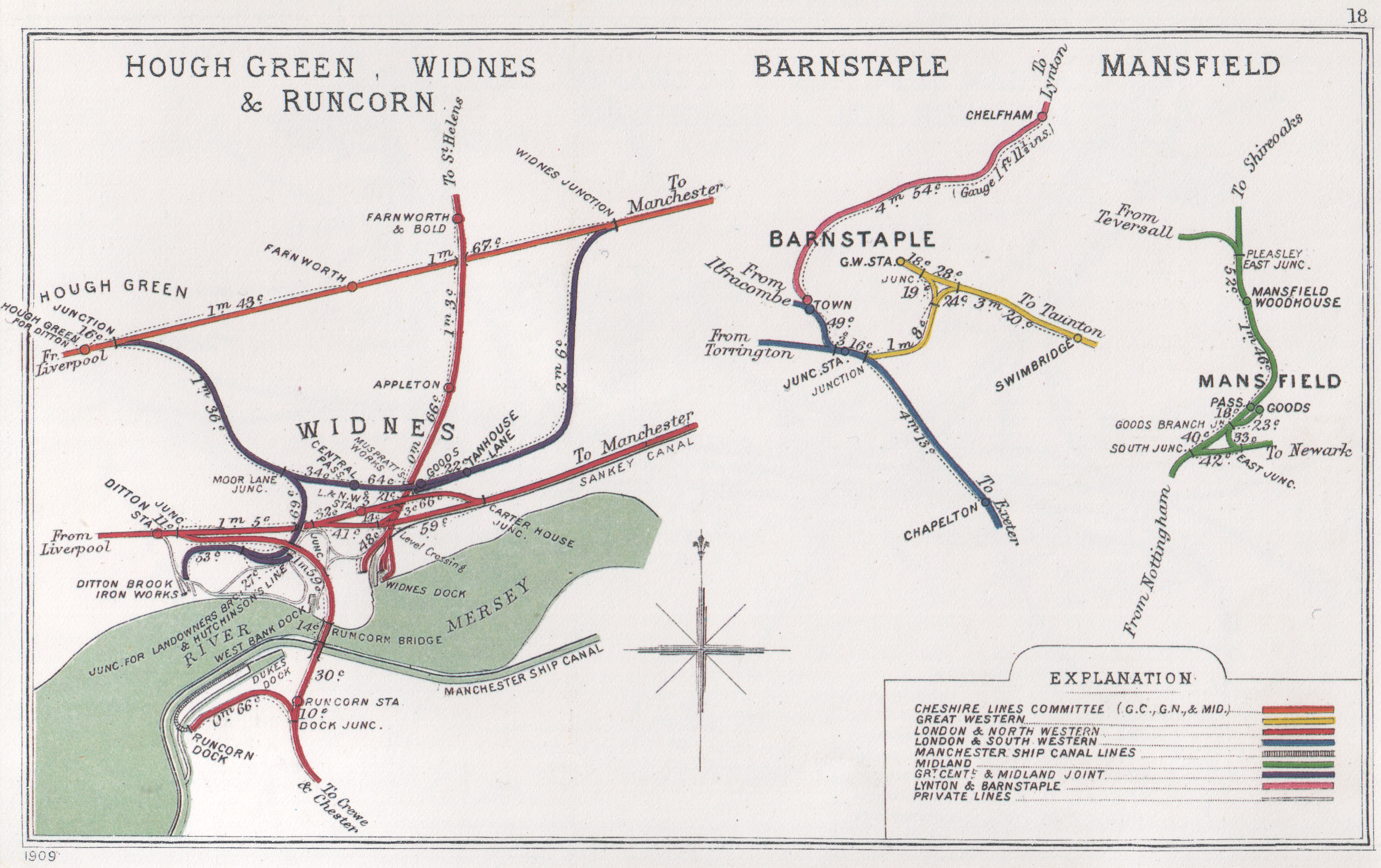
Details of the line around Widnes, 1909 (left)

Railway Clearing House Junction Diagrams showing portions of the St Helens and Runcorn Gap Railway

The St Helens and Runcorn Gap Railway was an early railway line owned by a company of the same name in Lancashire, England, which opened in 1833. It was later known as St Helens Railway. It ran originally from the town of St Helens to the area which would later develop into the town of Widnes. Branches were opened to Garston, Warrington and Rainford. The company was taken over by the London and North Western Railway in 1864. The line from St Helens to Widnes and the branch to Rainford are now closed, the latter terminating at the Pilkington Glass' Cowley Hill works siding near Gerard's Bridge, but part of the lines to Garston and to Warrington are still in operation.

== Independent company ==
St. Helens and Runcorn Gap Railway Act 1830
- Act of Parliament
- Parliament of the United Kingdom
- Long title: An Act for making a Railway from the Cowley Hill Colliery, in the Parish of Prescot to Runcorn Gap, in the same Parish (with several Branches therefrom), all in the County Palatine of Lancaster, and for constructing a Wet Dock at the termination of the said Railway at Runcorn Gap aforesaid.
- Citation: 11 Geo. 4 & 1 Will. 4. c. lxi

Dates
- Royal assent: 29 May 1830

St. Helens and Runcorn Gap Railway Act 1834
- Act of Parliament
- Parliament of the United Kingdom
- Long title: An Act to enlarge and amend the Powers and Provisions of an Act[c] relating to the Saint Helen's and Runcorn Gap Railway Company.
- Citation: 4 & 5 Will. 4. c. iii

Dates
- Royal assent: 26 March 1834

Text of statute as originally enacted

St. Helens and Runcorn Gap Railway Act 1838
- Act of Parliament
- Parliament of the United Kingdom
- Long title: An Act to enable the St Helens and Runcorn Gap Railway Company to raise a further Sum of Money, and for amending the Provisions of the several Acts relating to such Railway.
- Citation: 1 & 2 Vict. c. xxi

Dates
- Royal assent: 11 June 1838

With the coming of the Industrial Revolution in the 18th century, there was a need for coal to be carried from the coalfields in the area of St Helens to the River Mersey for transportation to the growing industrial towns and cities. The first solution was to build the Sankey Canal which opened in 1755 and ran from the Blackbrook canal via Parr to Sankey Bridges, to the west of Warrington. It was extended to the west, to Fiddlers Ferry, five years later. Encouraged by the success of the Stockton and Darlington Railway which opened in 1825, in 1829 a group of local businessmen arranged for a survey for a line from Cowley Hill Colliery, north of St Helens, to Runcorn Gap on the River Mersey. At this time the Liverpool and Manchester Railway, which ran to the south of St Helens, was being built and its surveyor, Charles Blacker Vignoles, was commissioned to undertake the survey; he was later appointed as the engineer. An act of Parliament, the St. Helens and Runcorn Gap Railway Act 1830 (11 Geo. 4 & 1 Will. 4. c. lxi), was obtained on 29 May 1830.

The original capital was £120,000, one-third of which was raised from local coal owners, salt-makers and Liverpool merchants. These included James Muspratt, soap and alkali manufacturer, and Peter Greenall, who had interests in the brewing, coal and glass manufacturing industries. Peter Greenall was elected as the first chairman of a board of ten directors. At the south end of the railway, Widnes Dock was built, which led into the Mersey. This was the world's first rail-to-ship facility. Because of perceived competition from the railway, the Sankey Canal was extended from Fiddlers Ferry to Runcorn Gap by what was known as the "New Cut". The railway terminated between the dock and the end of the canal and Runcorn Gap station was sited to the north of the canal.

Work on the line proceeded slowly and its costs overran the estimate. It did not open until 1833, but in November 1832 a train with coal wagons ran over the track because of a wager between one of the owners and the engineer that a train would pass over it by December 1832. The line opened officially on 21 February 1833 but the dock was not completed until August 1833. The extension to the Sankey Canal opened on 24 July 1833. From Widnes Dock, a single line crossed the extension to the canal by a swing bridge and then climbed steeply, so steeply that for a section trains had to be pulled by a stationary engine. Haulage by a stationary engine was also necessary for a section further north at Sutton near St Helens. The Liverpool and Manchester line was crossed by an iron bridge south of St Helens. The line was originally intended for freight but public demand led to passenger coaches being added to the rear of the trains, this service starting in September 1833.

St. Helens Canal and Railway Act 1845
- Act of Parliament
- Parliament of the United Kingdom
- Long title: An Act for uniting the Sankey Brook Navigation with the Saint Helens and Runcorn Gap Railway; and for other Purposes.
- Citation: 8 & 9 Vict. c. cxvii
- Territorial extent: United Kingdom

Dates
- Royal assent: 21 July 1845

Other legislation
- Amends: Sankey Brook Navigation Act 1830
- Amended by: St. Helens Canal and Railway Act 1846; St. Helens Canal and Railway Transfer Act 1864

Status: Current legislation

St. Helens Canal and Railway Act 1846
- Act of Parliament
- Parliament of the United Kingdom
- Long title: An Act to enable the Saint Helens Canal and Railway Company to make a Railway from the Township of Eccleston to the Township of Garston, with Branches therefrom, and Docks at Garston aforesaid, all in the County of Lancaster.
- Citation: 9 & 10 Vict. c. clxxxiii
- Territorial extent: United Kingdom

Dates
- Royal assent: 16 July 1846

Other legislation
- Amends: Sankey Brook Navigation Act 1830; St. Helens Canal and Railway Act 1845

Saint Helen's Canal and Railway Act 1847
- Act of Parliament
- Parliament of the United Kingdom
- Long title: An Act to enable the Saint Helen's Canal and Railway Company to make Branch Railways to Warrington and to Blackbrook, and to make certain Alterations in their Railway, and also to take a Lease of the Rainford Branch of the London and North-western Railway.
- Citation: 10 & 11 Vict. c. cclxxi

Dates
- Royal assent: 22 July 1847

Text of statute as originally enacted

St. Helen's Canal and Railway Act 1853
- Act of Parliament
- Parliament of the United Kingdom
- Long title: An Act to enable the St. Helen's Canal and Railway Company to extend their Railway to Rainford, and to enlarge their Stations at Sutton; and for other Purposes relating to the Company.
- Citation: 16 & 17 Vict. c. cxxxiv

Dates
- Royal assent: 4 August 1853

Text of statute as originally enacted

Saint Helens Canal and Railway Act 1857
- Act of Parliament
- Parliament of the United Kingdom
- Long title: An Act to authorize the Saint Helens Canal and Railway Company to increase and regulate their Capital, and for other Purposes relating to the Company.
- Citation: 20 & 21 Vict. c. xvi

Dates
- Royal assent: 26 June 1857

There was intense competition between the railway and the canal leading to financial difficulties for both companies; the canal company had reduced its dividends from 33.3% to 5.5% and the railway company was paying no dividend. The companies agreed to a merger, with the railway company buying out the canal company to form the St Helens Canal and Railway Company (SHCR). Royal assent for the St. Helens Canal and Railway Act 1845 (8 & 9 Vict. c. cxvii) enabling this was received on 21 July 1845. The company, which owned nine-second-hand tank engines and had a staff of 122, was described as being "ramshackle". It set about to improve the situation, doubling the track and easing the gradients so that the whole line could be operated by steam locomotives.

The new company then set about planning branch lines and connections. There had been a plan to build northwards from St Helens towards Southport to join the Southport and Euxton branch at Rufford. However this line was built only as far as Rainford. Here it joined the Lancashire Union Railway at Gerards Bridge Junction. The company bought land at Garston with the intention of building a dock and linking it with a line to Runcorn Gap. This opened as a single line on 1 July 1852, although the dock was not opened to shipping until 21 July 1853. On 21 May 1851, a sharp curve connection had been made on this line from the main line at what was to become known as Widnes Dock Junction. The following year a new Runcorn Gap station was opened nearer to the rapidly growing town of Widnes. The next project was to build a branch line to Warrington. This was opened on 1 February 1853, extending to a temporary station at White Cross, Warrington. In the following year it was extended to meet the Warrington and Stockport Railway. A station on this branch was opened at Cuerdley but this closed in January 1858. The creation of these branch lines created an unusual feature on British railways, a flat crossing. In the 1860s people could travel eastwards from Runcorn Gap to Warrington and, from there, to Manchester, London and many other places. They could also travel west to Liverpool by taking a ship at Garston.

London and North Western and St. Helens Railway Companies Arrangements Act 1860
- Act of Parliament
- Parliament of the United Kingdom
- Long title: An Act to authorize the Transfer to the London and North-western Railway Company of Part of the Undertaking of the Saint Helens Canal and Railway Company, and for the Increase of the Capital of the Saint Helens Company.
- Citation: 23 & 24 Vict. c. lxxix

Dates
- Royal assent: 14 June 1860

Saint Helen's Canal and Railway Transfer Act 1864
- Act of Parliament
- Parliament of the United Kingdom
- Long title: An Act for vesting the Undertaking of the Saint Helen's Canal and Railway Company in the London and North-western Railway Company.
- Citation: 27 & 28 Vict. c. ccxcvi
- Territorial extent: United Kingdom

Dates
- Royal assent: 29 July 1864
- Commencement: 29 July 1864 (Note: The Acts of Parliament (Commencement) Act 1793.)

Other legislation
- Amends: Sankey Brook Navigation Act 1830; St. Helens Canal and Railway Act 1845

Text of statute as originally enacted

By 1860, there was considerable competition between the railway companies. The London and North Western Railway (LNWR) wanted to build a line between Edge Hill and Garston. Following discussions, the LNWR leased the line from Garston to Warrington under the London and North Western and St. Helens Railway Companies Arrangements Act 1860 (23 & 24 Vict. c. lxxix) with effect from 1 September 1860, paying £5,000 for the first year and £12,000 annually from 1861. On 29 July 1864, an act of Parliament, the Saint Helen's Canal and Railway Transfer Act 1864 (27 & 28 Vict. c. ccxcvi), was passed which allowed SHCR to be absorbed by LNWR, and the transfer took place on 31 July 1864. Runcorn Gap station was renamed Widnes station on 1 September 1864.

== Later developments ==
Widnes Dock Junction and the flat crossing were causing problems of congestion and the LNWR dealt with this by building a deviation line of just under 1.5 miles (2 km) to the north of the original west–east line, crossing the line leading north to St Helens by a bridge. The deviation line was authorised on 5 July 1865 and opened on 1 November 1869. The line was connected to the St Helens and it included a new station for passengers. With the opening of the line from Weaver Junction across the Mersey on Runcorn Railway Bridge to Ditton Junction, west of Widnes, the Garston extension became part of the Liverpool-London main line. Following the merger of most of Britain's railways into four private companies in 1923, the line from St Helens to Widnes became part of the London, Midland and Scottish Railway (LMS). Large quantities of freight were carried on the line and the passenger train from St Helen's to Ditton Junction station was nicknamed the Ditton Dodger.

Following the end of the Second World War, passenger traffic declined and the service provided by the Ditton Dodger ended on 16 June 1951. Freight traffic initially continued to be heavy but it declined during the 1960s. In 1969, the line north from Farnworth and Bold station was singled and in 1975 the line south of the station was also singled. The line closed to through traffic on 1 November 1981. The track has been lifted and some of the southern part of the route is occupied by Watkinson Way, a road providing an easterly bypass for Widnes and connecting the Silver Jubilee Bridge with the M62 motorway. The base of the swing bridge which carried the railway over the canal is still present in Spike Island.

As of 2009, where the line runs near the St Helens Retail Park, the embankment has been reinforced and is said to be for a rail link for visitors from out of town to the new Saints RLFC stadium. It is also rumoured that the track on Robins Lane will be relaid to connect through to St Helens Junction.

Work is close to completion in 2014 to reclaim the section of the railway that ran from Clock Face to Farnworth and Bold as a footpath for walkers and cyclists. Drainage and the majority of the new footpath has now been laid for the public and is already accessible. The footpath can now be enjoyed as part of the reclaimed Sutton Manor Colliery and Jaume Plensa's Dream monument, winner of Channels 4's 'The Big Art Project'.

In the Integrated Rail Plan for the North and Midlands, the UK government proposed using the Warrington Bank Quay to Ditton as part of a new connection to Liverpool from High Speed 2.
