= Grade II listed buildings in Liverpool-L18 =

Liverpool is a city and port in Merseyside, England, which contains many listed buildings. A listed building is a structure designated by English Heritage of being of architectural and/or of historical importance and, as such, is included in the National Heritage List for England. There are three grades of listing, according to the degree of importance of the structure. Grade I includes those buildings that are of "exceptional interest, sometimes considered to be internationally important"; the buildings in Grade II* are "particularly important buildings of more than special interest"; and those in Grade II are "nationally important and of special interest". Very few buildings are included in Grade I — only 2.5% of the total. Grade II* buildings represent 5.5% of the total, while the great majority, 92%, are included in Grade II.

Liverpool contains more than 1,550 listed buildings, of which 28 are in Grade I, 109 in Grade II*, and the rest in Grade II. (Note: These figures are taken from a search in the National Heritage List for England in May 2013, and are subject to variation as further buildings are listed, grades are revised, or buildings are delisted.) This list contains the Grade II listed buildings in the L18 postal district of Liverpool. The district lies to the south of the city centre, forming a suburb of the city. It is mainly residential and contains houses of all types, from the former mansions of prosperous businessmen, through suburban middle-class housing, to terraces for workmen. Within the district is Calderstones Park.

Grade II listed buildings from other areas in the city can be found through the box on the right, along with the lists of the Grade I and Grade II* buildings in the city.

== Buildings ==
Name	Location	Photograph	Built	Notes
Cleveley Cottage	Allerton Road; 53.3709°N 2.8903°W	—	1865	A house designed by George Gilbert Scott for a cotton merchant, Joseph Leather. It is built in stone and has a slate roof. The house is in two storeys, and has a three-bay front. The windows are mullioned and have two lights, with one window in a gabled half-dormer. There is a further wing to the rear.
Stable block, Cleveleys	Allerton Road; 53.3710°N 2.8906°W	—	1865	This originated as stables and a coach house for the house Cleveleys, now demolished. It was designed by George Gilbert Scott, and is in stone with a slate roof. The building is in three ranges around a yard. The east range is in two storeys, and is in four bays, the end bays projecting forward under gables. In the north range is a clock tower with a louvred bell stage and a short spire. The west range contained stables.
Hoarwithy Lodge	Allerton Road; 53.3721°N 2.8921°W	—	1865	A lodge designed by George Gilbert Scott for Cleverleys. It is in stone with a hipped slate roof. The lodge has one storey, and is in a T-shaped plan. In the angle is a porch with a hipped roof carried on columns. At the end of one bay is a bay window, and in the other bay is a two-light window with a quatrefoil above in a gable.
Lodge, Allerton Park Golf Club	Allerton Road; 53.37366°N 2.89253°W		c. 1815	The lodge was built for the house named Allerton, and was probably designed by Thomas Harrison who designed the house. It is a stuccoed building in Neoclassical style, and has a hipped slate roof. It is in a single storey, with two bays on each front, and an extension at the rear. The lodge has a Doric entablature, and a Doric porch with a frieze and a small pediment.
New Heys	Allerton Road; 53.3701°N 2.8900°W	—	1861–65	A house designed by Alfred Waterhouse for W. G. Bateman, a lawyer, and later converted into apartments. It is built in brick with stone dressings and has slate roofs. The house is in two storeys with a basement and attics, and has an eight-bay front, with three bays projecting forward under gables. Most of the windows have transoms, and above the porch is a triangular oriel window. On the garden front is a verandah and a conservatory.
St Barnabas' Church	Allerton Road; 53.3886°N 2.9149°W		1900–14	The church was designed by James Francis Doyle who died before its building was completed. It is constructed in brick and terracotta blocks, with stone dressings and a slate roof. It is in Perpendicular style, and consists of a nave with aisles, transepts, a chancel with a south chapel, and a west embattled tower.
Entrance, Calderstones Park	Calderstones Road; 53.38426°N 2.89990°W		Mid 19th century	This consists of a pair of stone gate piers flanked by curving walls designed by H. W. Pritchard. The gate piers are carved with large figures of Atlantes. On the walls are statues representing the Four Seasons, designed by Sir James Picton, and moved from Brown's Buildings in the city centre when it was demolished in the 1920s. The gates carry the coat of arms of Liverpool.
Calderstones House	Calderstones Road; 53.3815°N 2.8940°W		1828	Located in Calderstones Park, this originated as a mansion. It later became offices for Liverpool City Council, and in 2013 was acquired by The Reader Organisation. It is built in stone and has a slate roof. The house has two storeys, and a front of ten bays. The windows are sashes. The right five bays project forward, and at the centre is a four-column Doric portico. The right side of the house has five bays, with a three-bay bow window. At the rear is a stage for an open-air theatre which was added in 1945–47.
Stable block, Calderstones House	Calderstones Road; 53.3823°N 2.8946°W	—	c. 1828	The stable block to Calderstones House is built in red sandstone. The former coach house is in two storeys, with a front of nine bays, the central three bays projecting forward. Some of the windows are lunettes with casements, the other windows being sashes. Entry is through segmental-headed arches. Behind the coach house are stables.
Harthill Lodge	Calderstones Road; 53.3844°N 2.8986°W	—	Mid 19th century	The lodge is stuccoed, and has a roof of hexagonal slates. It is in a single storey, and has a five-bay front. The end bays project forward under pediments, and have pilasters, friezes, and cornices. The central bays are rusticated with a cornice and a three-bay arcade. The windows are sashes.
Mossley Hill Baptist Church	Dovedale Road; 53.3857°N 2.9181°W		1905–06	A Baptist church faced in flint with dressings in red brick and terracotta. It has a slate roof with red tile cresting. The style is Perpendicular. The church has a T-shaped plan consisting of a nave with wide transepts. The entrance face has three doorways; the doorway on the left is in a porch with a pyramidal roof, that on the right is in a tower.
Stable block	Druid's Cross Road; 53.3842°N 2.8865°W	—	c. 1845	The stable block was designed by Harvey Lonsdale Elmes in Italianate style. It is in stone with a hipped slate roof. The block has two storeys, and extends for eight bays, the fourth bay projecting forward under a pediment. The windows in the lower floor are sashes, in the upper floor they are casements. At the rear of the block is a small belvedere-like tower with angle pilasters, round-headed openings, a corbelled cornice, and a hipped roof.
—	14 Druid's Cross Road; 53.3842°N 2.8897°W	—	c. 1847	This was built as the lodge to Druid's Cross House (now demolished), and designed by Harvey Lonsdale Elmes. It is in stone with a hipped slate roof. The lodge is in a single storeys, and has a three-bay front, the first bay projecting forward. At the top of the lodge is an entablature and a frieze. The entrance is in the centre, and has an architrave and a cornice. The windows are a mix of casements and sashes.
Rockbank	23 Elmsley Road; 53.3813°N 2.9177°W	—	1860s	A house, later divided into flats, in brick with stone dressings and a slate roof. It has two storeys, and a front of four bays, the first bay being lower and recessed, the fourth bay being gabled. The first bay contains two lancet windows and a canted oriel window. The other three bays have a ground floor extension. On the right side is a canted two-storey bay window.
—	1–15 Gordon Place, 3 Bridge Street; 53.3800°N 2.9154°W	—	Mid 19th century	A terrace of nine houses in common brick with red brick and stone dressings and a slate roof. The terrace has two storeys, and each house is in a single bay. Most of the windows are sashes with wedge lintels, others are casements. The entrances have segmental brick heads. The terrace was built for workmen on a pedestrian street with a central gutter.
Calder High School, (original part)	Harthill Road; 53.3839°N 2.9009°W	—	Mid 19th century	Originally a house, it later became part of a school. It is a stuccoed building with a hipped slate roof. The building is in two storeys, and has three bays on each front; there is a two-storey lower wing on the left, also with three bays. The windows are sashes. The round-headed entrance has angle pilasters and archivolts, and a Corinthian porch with a pierced balcony. At the rear is a tower with angle pilasters, an entablature, and a pierced parapet.
Harthill Lodge	Harthill Road; 53.38226°N 2.90029°W	—	Mid 19th century	The lodge was built for a house named Harthill, which has been demolished. It is a stuccoed building with a slate roof in an L-shaped plan, with two storeys. The narrow windows have four-centred heads, and the gables have decorative traceried bargeboards.
Quarry Bank House	Harthill Road; 53.3827°N 2.9012°W		1866–67	The house was built for James Bland, a timber merchant, and was designed by Culshaw and Sumners. It is built in stone with a slate roof, and has an irregular plan. The house is in two storeys with attics, and has a six-bay gabled front. The entrance is in Gothic style, with polished granite columns. Most of the windows are mullioned. In 1922 the house became part of Quarry Bank High School, later Calderstones School.
South Lodge, Quarry Bank House	Harthill Road; 53.38201°N 2.90094°W	—	1866–67	The lodge is built in stone with a steep hipped slate roof topped by iron cresting. It is in one storey with an attic, and has a rectangular plan with canted ends. On the south end is a bow window containing casements. Elsewhere are half-dormers containing sashes. To the left of the lodge are two gate piers with pyramidal caps.
Sudley House	Mossley Hill Drive; 53.3736°N 2.9213°W		c. 1820	A stone house with a hipped slate roof, built for Nicholas Robinson, a corn merchant, and later bought by the ship owner George Holt, who extended it. It is in two storeys, and has a four bay front. The windows are sashes. The house has a porch with Doric columns and an Ionic entablature. On the roof is a small cupola. In the 1940s the house and its contents, including the art collection, were bequeathed to the City of Liverpool, later becoming part of National Museums Liverpool.
Sudley Lodge	Mossley Hill Road; 53.37475°N 2.92068°W	—	Late 19th century	The lodge to Sudley House is built in stone and has a slate roof with tile cresting. It is in a single storey with attics, and has a two-bay front. The second bay is bowed with a four-column Doric colonnade. The windows are sashes, other than a single casement in the centre of the second bay. The porch is also in Doric style, with an Ionic entablature. In the attics are half-dormers, and there are ball finials on the gables.
Holmstead Cottage	North Mossley Hill Road; 53.37803°N 2.92087°W	—	c. 1840s	A lodge for Holmstead, possibly designed by Cunningham and Holme. It is built in stone with a slate roof, and is in a single storey with an attic. The front is in three bays. The central bay projects forward containing the entrance, above which is a lancet window in a half-dormer surmounted by a finial. The windows are casements.
Holmstead Lodge	North Mossley Hill Road; 53.37683°N 2.92052°W		c. 1840s	The lodge is built in stone with a slate roof. It is in a single storey with an attic, and has a three-bay front, The central bay projects forward under a gable, and above the porch is a pierced parapet. On the right side is an oriel window. All the windows are casements.
Quendale	North Mossley Hill Road; 53.3809°N 2.9219°W	—	Mid 19th century	A roughcast house with stone dressings and a slate roof. It is in two storeys, and has a three-bay front, the lateral bays projecting forward under gables. The porch is canted with a parapet, and the windows are sashes.
St Saviour's Convent	North Mossley Hill Road; 53.3777°N 2.9205°W	—	c. 1845	Built as a house called Holmestead, it has latter been used as a convent. Part of the original building was designed by A. H. Holme, and the later part added in 1869–70, possibly by Culshaw and Sumners. It is built in stone with slate roofs. The building has a complex plan, its features including an entrance tower with an oriel window and a steep pavilion roof, gargoyles, an embattled parapet, a pierced balcony, and a large cast iron conservatory. The terrace, with its pierced balustrade and cast iron urns, is included in the listing.
Entrance gates, St Saviour's Convent	North Mossley Hill Road; 53.37686°N 2.92071°W	—	c. 1840s	A pair of stone gate piers with flanking curved walls, possibly designed by Cunningham and Holme. The piers are octagonal and have ogival caps and spike finials. The gates are in wrought iron and are highly ornate.
Mossley Hill Hospital, (original part)	Park Road; 53.3804°N 2.9255°W	—	1869	This originated as a house designed by Alfred Waterhouse, and was later incorporated into the hospital. It is built in common brick with red brick and stone dressings, and has a tiled roof. The house has a square plan, is in two storeys with an attic, and has an asymmetrical south-facing entrance front of six bays with four irregular gables. The west front is symmetrical, and the fenestration throughout is varied.
Oakfield	Penny Lane; 53.3850°N 2.9239°W		Mid 19th century	A stone house with a slate roof, it has two storeys and an eight-bay front. The second bay contains a gabled porch. The third bay projects forward, and contains a canted bay window with an embattled parapet. The right four bays are recessed, and contain sash windows; elsewhere there are casement windows. On the left side are two gabled bays with canted bay windows. The gables contain decorative bargeboards.
Township boundary stone	Rose Lane; 53.37708°N 2.91980°W	—	Uncertain	The stone is set against the wall to the north of the Church of St Matthew and St James. It is weathered and has a rounded top. It is carved with a vertical line with "W" (Wavertree) on one side and "G" (Garston) on the other.
Vicarage and Mosslake Lodge	Rose Lane; 53.3766°N 2.9199°W	—	1873	This is the vicarage of the Church of St Matthew and St James. It was probably designed by Paley and Austin, who designed the church. The building is in stone with a slate roof, and has an L-shaped plan. It is in two and three storeys, the west wing having four bays. Its features include a large tower with a pyramidal roof, staircase windows containing tracery, and a dormer.
Wall, entrances, and drinking fountain, Church of St Matthew and St James	Rose Lane; 53.37652°N 2.92098°W	—	c. 1875	The stone wall was two entrances, with a drinking fountain at its midpoint, and was probably designed by Paley and Austin. The entrances have gate piers with gabled buttresses and panels containing tracery, and between them are wrought iron gates. The drinking fountain has an elliptical bowl under a canopy with a crocketed ogee-shaped head. Below this is a smaller bowl for dogs.
—	1 and 3 Rose Lane; 53.3786°N 2.9173°W	—	c. 1840	A pair of stuccoed houses with a hipped slate roof. They are in two storeys, and each house has a front of three bays, the central bays being recessed, and the outer bays canted. The entrances are on the sides, and have pilasters and entablatures. No 1 has a rectangular bay window.
—	1–10 Stanley Terrace; 53.3797°N 2.9150°W	—	Mid 19th century	A terrace of ten brick houses with stone dressings and a slate roof. The terrace has two storeys, and each house is in a single bay. The windows are sashes with wedge lintels, and the doorways are in pairs. The terrace was built for workmen on a pedestrian street with a central gutter.
—	11–19 Stanley Terrace, 1 Bridge Street; 53.3798°N 2.9152°W	—	Mid 19th century	A terrace of ten brick houses with stone dressings and a slate roof. The terrace has two storeys, and each house is in a single bay. Most of the windows are sashes with wedge lintels, others are casements, and the doorways are in pairs. 1 Bridge Street is pebbledashed and has an inserted shop window. The terrace was built for workmen on a pedestrian street with a central gutter.

== See also ==
Architecture of Liverpool

== References and notes ==
Notes

Citations

Sources

- Pollard, Richard; Pevsner, Nikolaus (2006), Lancashire: Liverpool and the South-West, The Buildings of England, New Haven and London: Yale University Press, ISBN 0-300-10910-5
