= Albion House, Liverpool =

Listed building in Liverpool, England

White Star Line Building
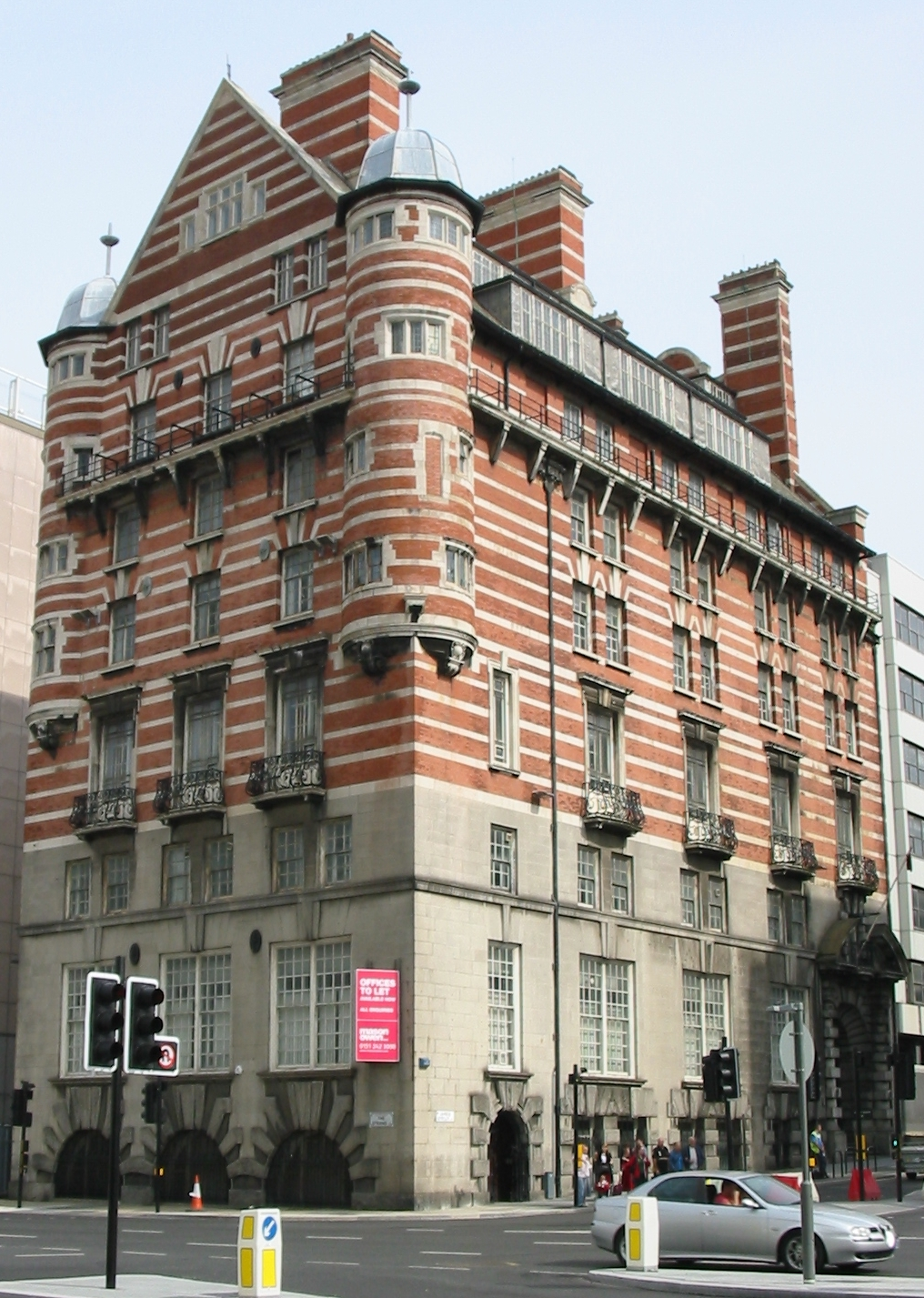
- The building in 2008

- Location within Liverpool

General information
- Type: Office
- Location: Liverpool, England
- Coordinates: 53.4046°N 2.9925°W
- Construction started: 1896
- Completed: 1898

Design and construction
- Architects: Richard Norman Shaw; James Francis Doyle
- Designations

Listed Building – Grade II*
- Official name: Albion House
- Designated: 28 June 1952
- Reference no.: 1207759

Albion House (also known as 30 James Street or the White Star Line Building) is a Grade II* listed building located in Liverpool, England. It was constructed between 1896 and 1898 and is positioned on the corner of James Street and The Strand across from the Pier Head.

== History ==
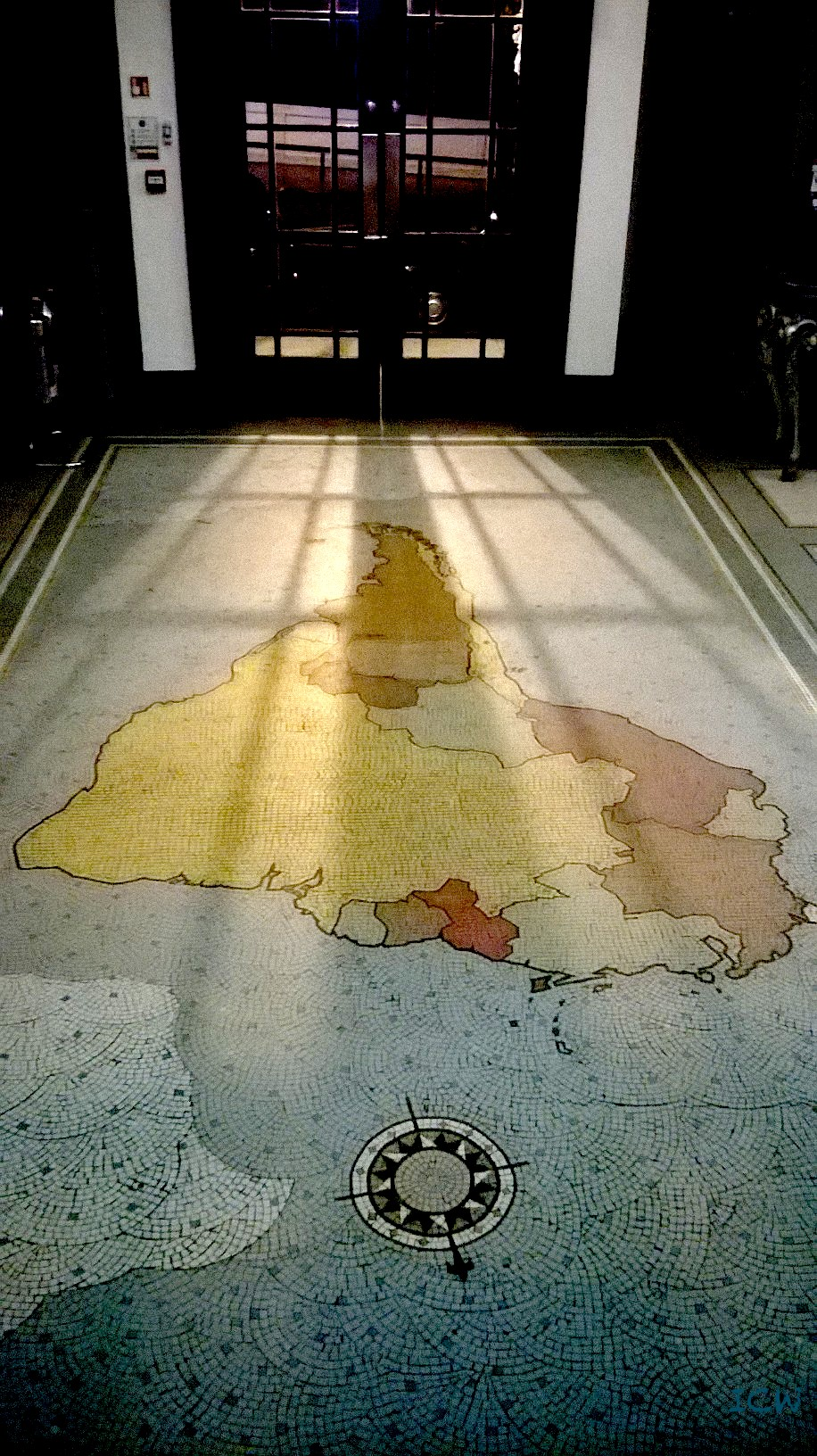
Albion House (White Star Line Building), interior lobby

Designed by architects Richard Norman Shaw and J. Francis Doyle, it was built for the Ismay, Imrie and Company shipping company, which later became the White Star Line. After White Star merged with Royal Mail Line, the headquarters remained at Albion House until 1934, at which time the British Government forced the merger of Cunard Line and White Star Line. The building is situated on the corner of The Strand and James Street. The facade is constructed from white Portland stone and red brick. In 1912, when news of the disaster of the Titanic disaster reached Liverpool, company officials read the names of the survivors from the balcony to the large crowd outside.

During the Second World War, the gable was damaged and was later rebuilt in the late 1940s.

After many years being vacant, in 2014 the building was converted into a Titanic-themed hotel known as 30 James Street.

== Architecture ==
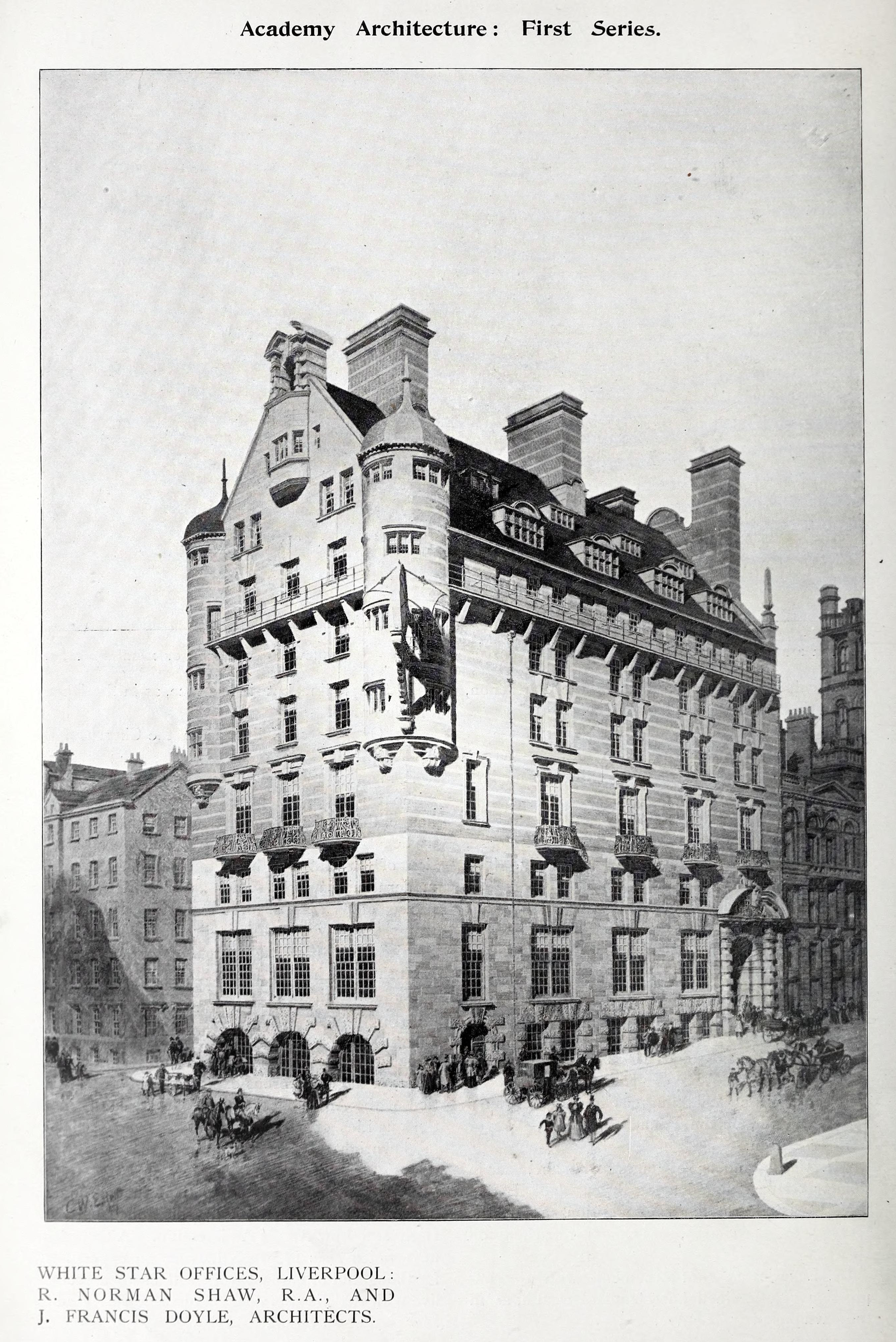
Perspective drawing of the building

The design closely follows the architect's earlier work of 1887, the former New Scotland Yard building in London. In the 1980s, the offices in Albion House were noted for their exquisite desks of fine wood. The entrance to the building at James Street has a fine mosaic of South America set into the floor, also near the James Street entrance inside Albion House was a wooden war memorial listing the members of staff who "Gave their lives for their country" in the 1914–18 War.

Albion House is recorded in the National Heritage List for England as a designated Grade II* listed building.

== See also ==
- Oceanic House, White Star's London building.
- Grade II* listed buildings in Liverpool – City Centre
- Grade II* listed buildings in Merseyside
