= Oceanic House =

Building in Westminster, London, England

Coordinates: 51.5079°N 0.1300°W

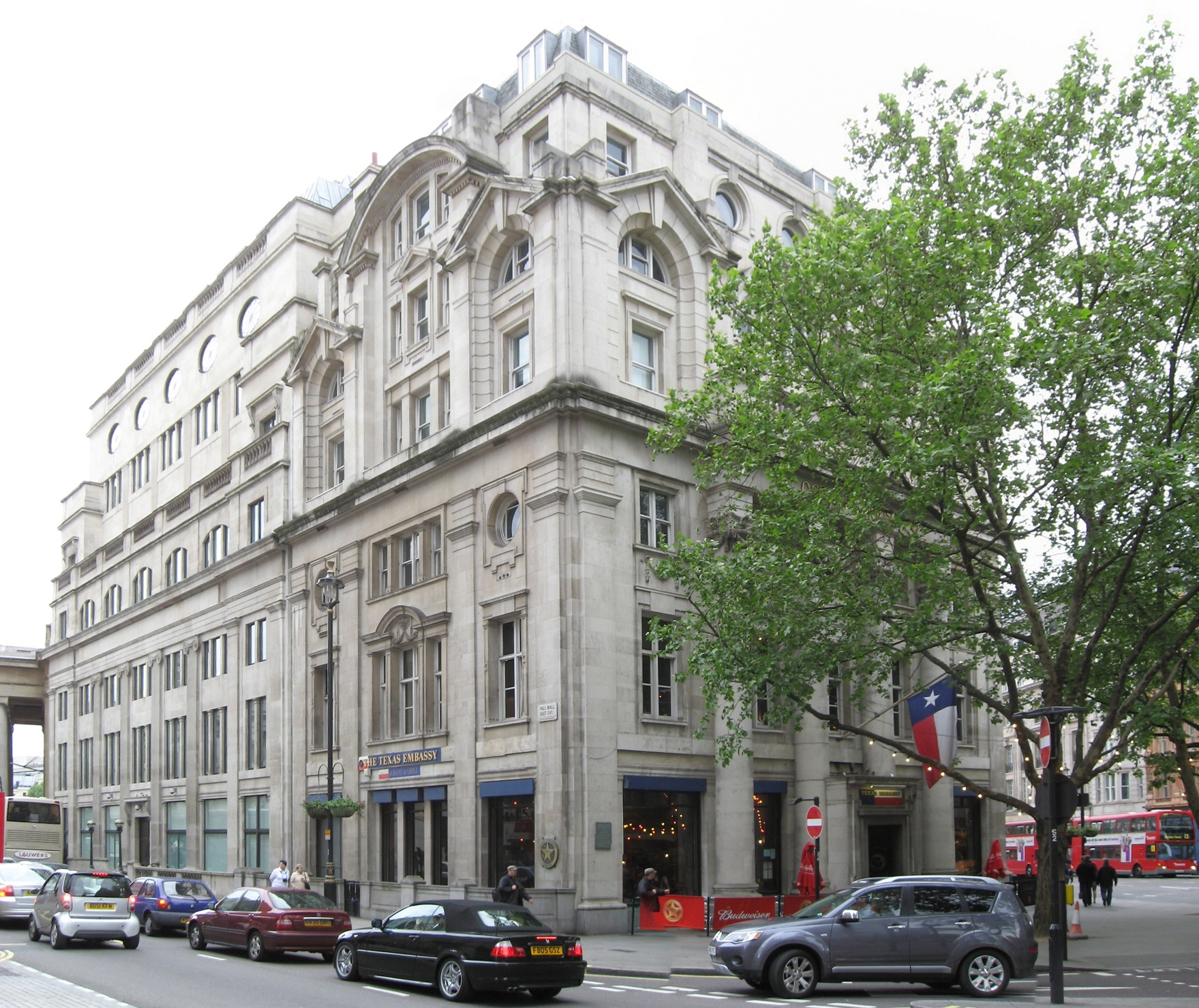
Oceanic House (right), when it was used as the Texas Embassy Cantina restaurant (closed 2012).

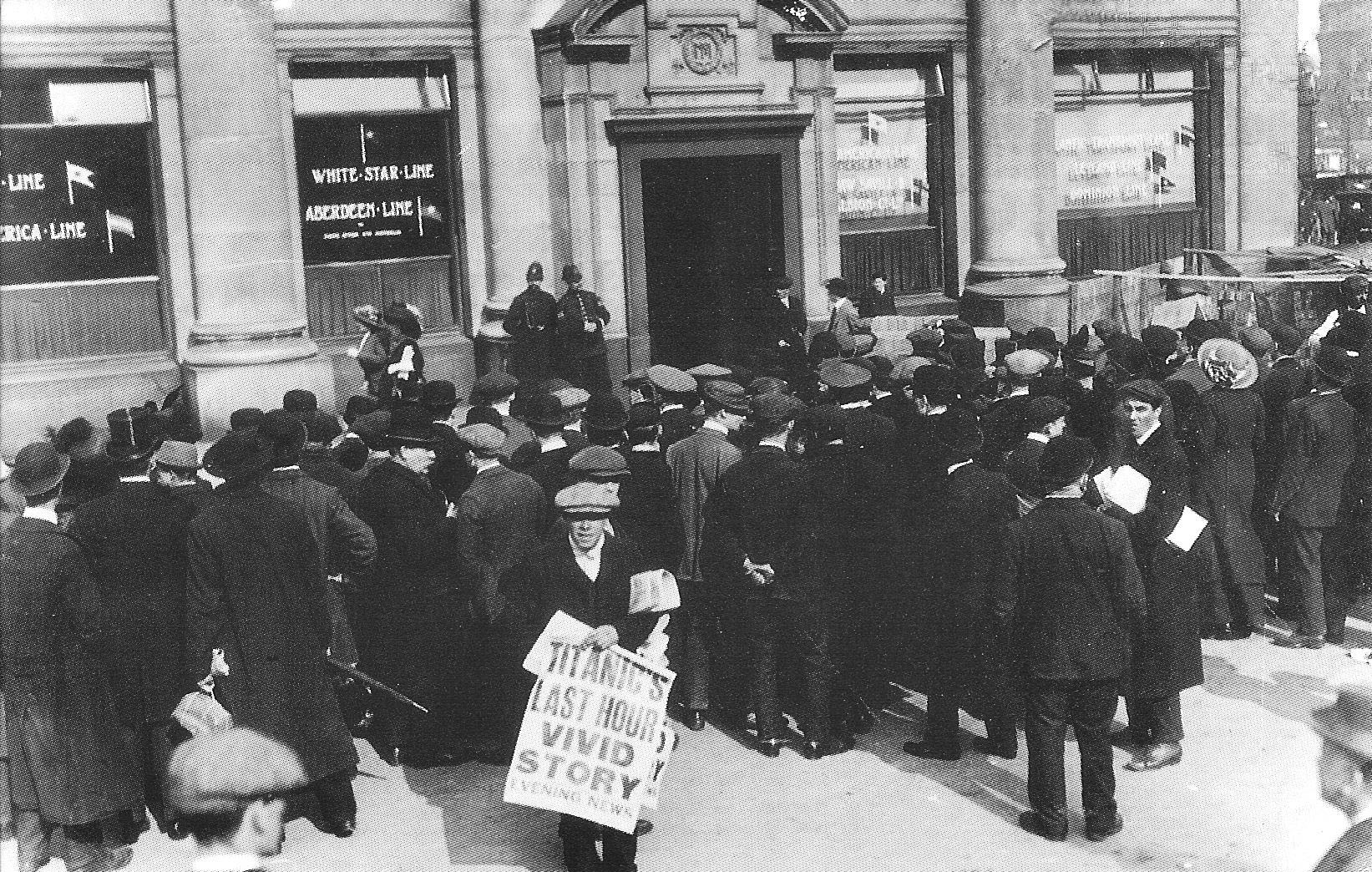
Crowds outside Oceanic House after the news of the sinking of RMS Titanic in 1912.

Oceanic House is a grade II listed former office building at 1 Cockspur Street, in the City of Westminster, London. It was designed by Henry Tanner junior and was completed in 1907. It was originally the London headquarters of the White Star Line from which tickets for the RMS Titanic were sold. It later became a Barclays Bank, was used by the British Ministry of Defence, and became the Texas Embassy Cantina restaurant which closed in 2012. In 2016 it was converted into six luxury apartments and a duplex penthouse. It is owned by the Crown Estate.

== See also ==
- Albion House, White Star's Liverpool building.
