= St Anthony of Padua Church, Liverpool =

St Anthony of Padua Church
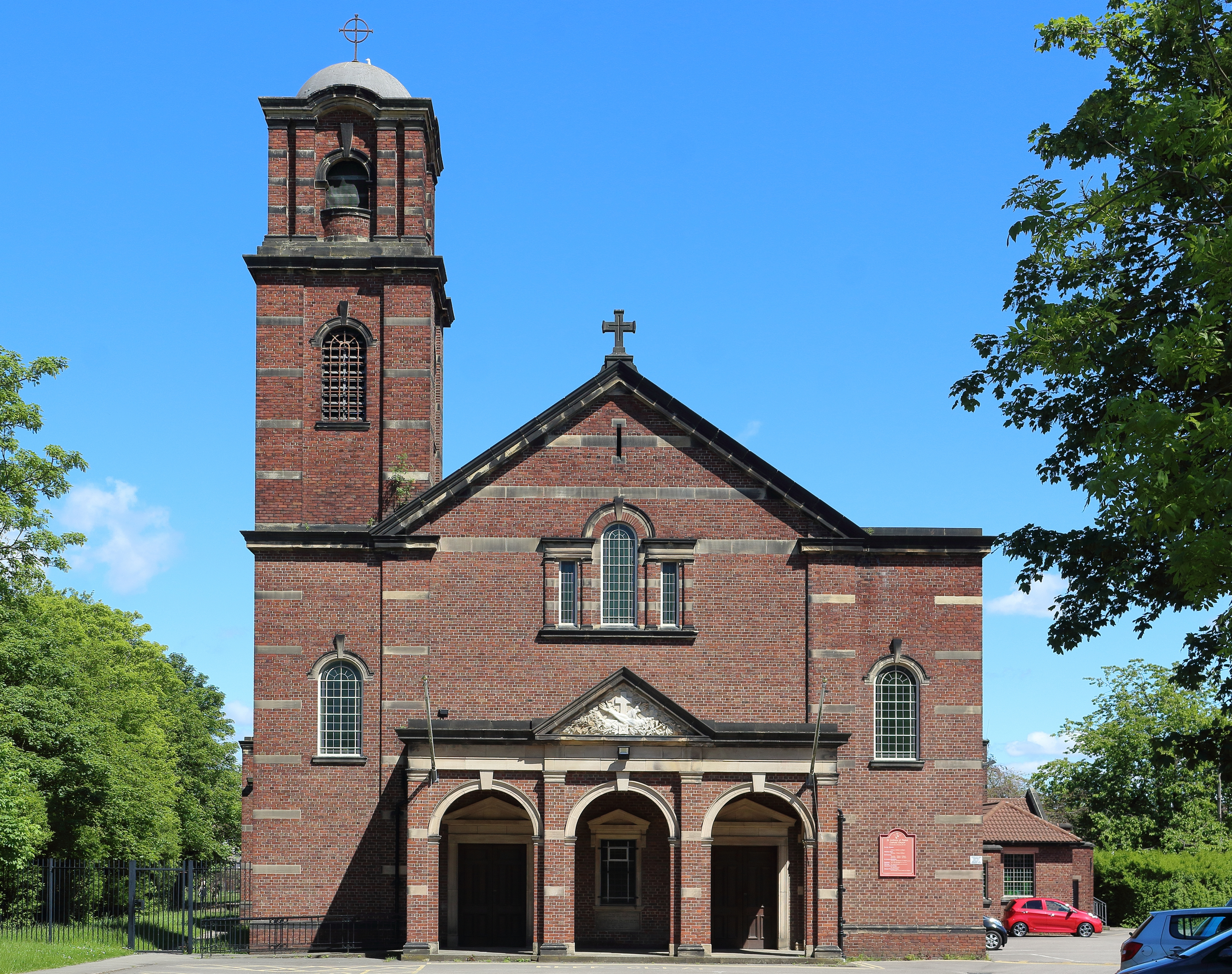
- St Anthony of Padua Church
- 53.382208°N 2.920081°W
- OS grid reference: SJ 38896 87655
- Location: Mossley Hill, Liverpool
- Country: England
- Denomination: Roman Catholic
- Religious institute: Order of Friars Minor Conventual
- Website: Official website

History
- Status: Active
- Founded: 1926
- Dedication: Anthony of Padua

Architecture
- Architect: Anthony Ellis
- Style: Romanesque Revival
- Groundbreaking: 1931
- Completed: 1932
- Construction cost: £16,500

Administration
- Archdiocese: Liverpool
- Deanery: Liverpool South

St Anthony of Padua Church is a Roman Catholic parish church in Mossley Hill, Liverpool. It was built from 1931 to 1932 by the Franciscan Order of Friars Minor Conventual. It is on Queens Drive opposite Liverpool College. The church was one of the first started by the friars coming from New York in the re-establishment of the Conventual Friars in England after the Reformation.

== History ==
=== Foundation ===
In 1906, the Order of Friars Minor Conventual, the Conventual Franciscan friars came to England. Two Maltese friars, Fr Bonaventure Sceberras and Fr Roger Azzopardi started a mission in Portishead, Somerset that became St Joseph's Church. In 1910, the friars started St Anthony of Padua Church, Rye in East Sussex. In 1926, friars came from Syracuse, New York to Mossley Hill in Liverpool. The site of the church was bought from Liverpool City Council and the adjacent Elmsley House was bought to be a friary and parish hall.

=== Construction ===
On 7 November 1926, a temporary church was opened by the Archbishop of Liverpool Frederick Keating. In 1931, building work started on St Anthony of Padua Church. In 1932, the church was opened and consecrated. The architect was Anthony Ellis and the cost of the church was £16,500. In the construction of the church, the friars told Ellis to use the same basilica plan as Assumption Church in Syracuse. Assumption Church was built in 1859 and is the mother church of the Conventual Franciscans in the northeast United States.

=== Developments ===
In 1933, an organ was installed in St Anthony of Padua Church, it came from the German Church on Renshaw Street in Liverpool. From 1947 to 1955, the friary was a novitiate for the Conventual Friars in Britain. In the 1950s, a marble reredos and painted murals were added. From 1962 to 1963, the murals in the apsidal sanctuary were replaced by ones painted by Giuseppe Lerario OFM, which depict Our Lady of the Immaculate Conception, the pope and bishops of the Second Vatican Council as well as murals of St Anthony of Padua and St Francis of Assisi.

== Parish ==
The friars continue to serve the parish. There are four Sunday Masses in the church at 6:00pm on Saturday and at 08:00am,10:00 am and 12:00 pm on Sunday.

== Church and friary ==
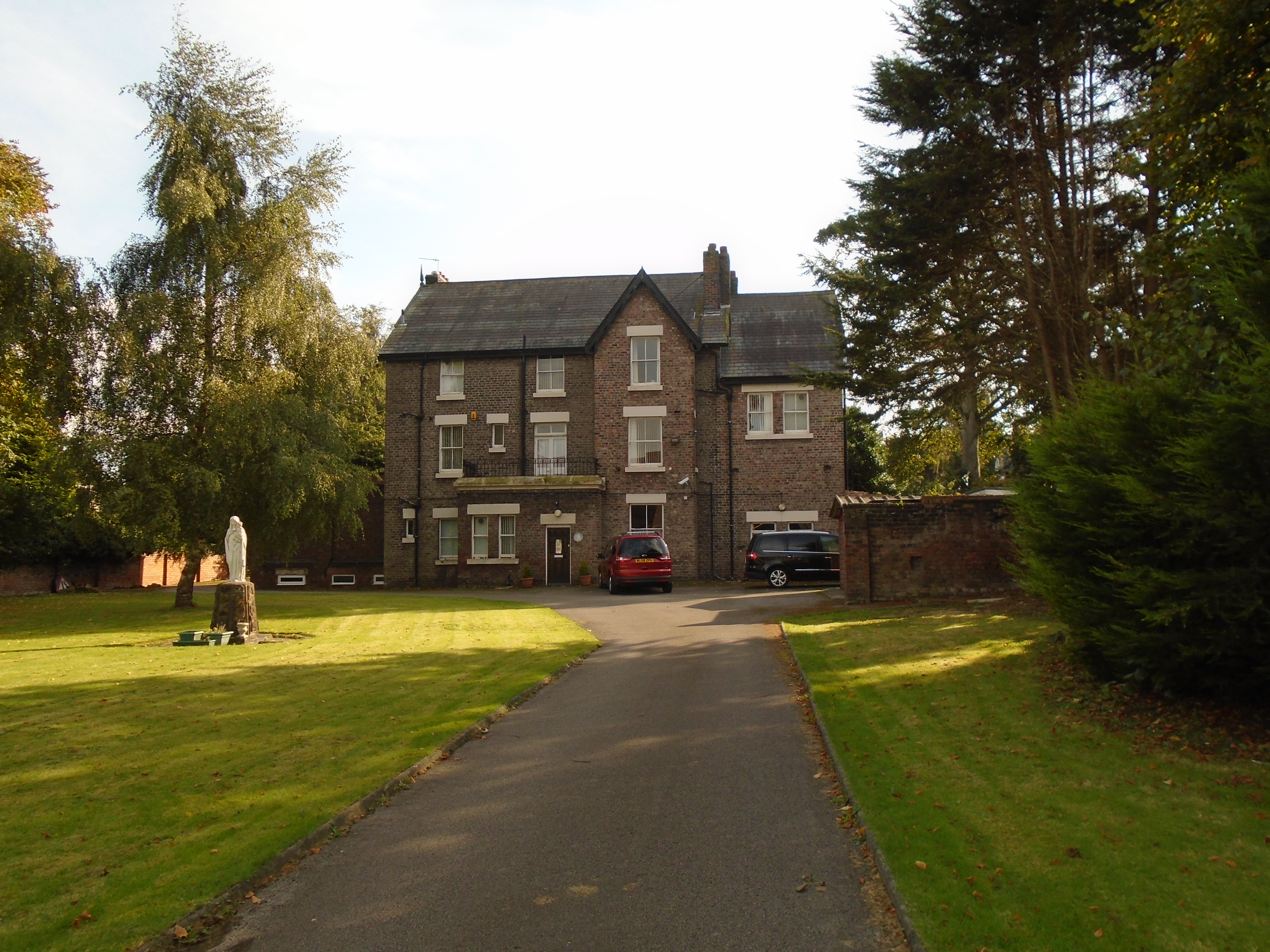
Friary

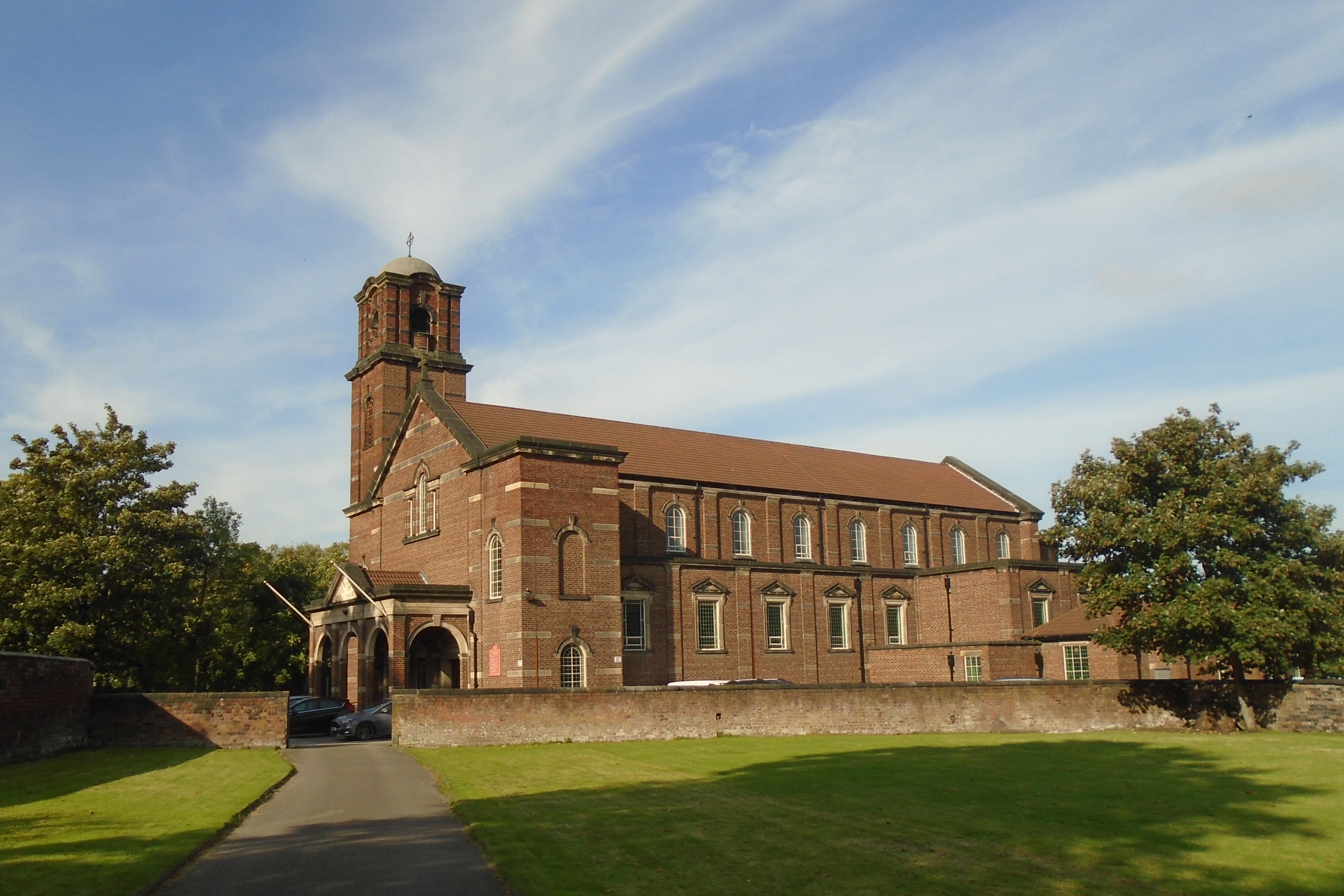
Side of church

== See also ==
- Archdiocese of Liverpool
