= Mossley Hill =

Suburb of Liverpool, England

Coordinates: 53.379°N 2.918°W

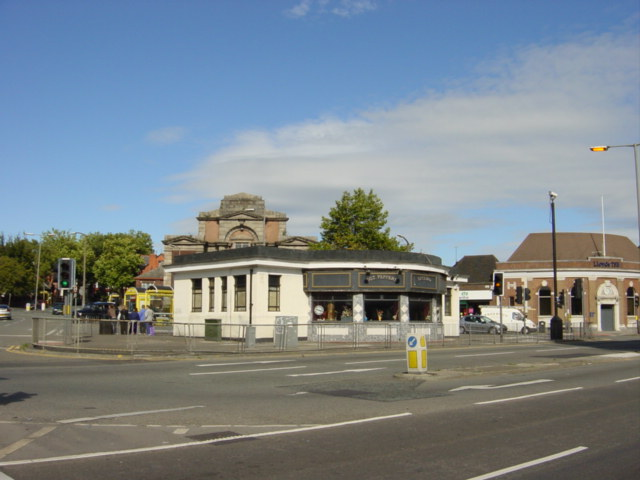
- The "shelter in the middle of the roundabout" mentioned in The Beatles' song "Penny Lane"

- Location within Merseyside
- Population: 13,816 (2011 Census)
- OS grid reference: SJ390873
- Metropolitan borough: City of Liverpool
- Metropolitan county: Merseyside
- Region: North West
- Country: England
- Sovereign state: United Kingdom
- Post town: LIVERPOOL
- Postcode district: L18, L19
- Dialling code: 0151
- Police: Merseyside
- Fire: Merseyside
- Ambulance: North West
- UK Parliament: Liverpool Riverside; Liverpool Wavertree

Mossley Hill is a suburb of Liverpool and ward of Liverpool City Council. Located 3.5 miles southeast of the city centre, it is bordered by the suburbs of Aigburth, Allerton, Childwall, and Wavertree. At the 2001 Census, the population was 12,650, increasing to 13,816 at the 2011 Census.

== Overview ==
Mossley Hill is considered an affluent area and is mostly residential with a few local businesses. Housing is mainly semi-detached, with occasional detached and numerous terraced streets. It lies on the border of two Parliamentary constituencies: Liverpool Riverside and Liverpool Wavertree. It is represented on Liverpool City Council by councillors from the Mossley Hill ward, though parts of it stretch into the Greenbank and Church wards.

The suburb is the location of Dovedale Primary School, whose alumni includes George Harrison, John Lennon, Peter Sissons, Jimmy Tarbuck, and John Power. Calderstones School, which Lennon attended when it was called Quarry Bank, is located nearby. Liverpool College, which was a fee-paying independent school until 2013, is also located within the area. Liverpool's only grammar school, the Liverpool Blue Coat School, is also nearby in the neighbouring suburb of Wavertree. The area is home to two student accommodation buildings, the Greenbank Halls of Residence and the now-defunct Carnatic Halls of Residence, both catering to students of the University of Liverpool.

Mossley Hill's local park is Greenbank Park, one of the most popular parks in Liverpool; two more of the city's most popular parks, Sefton Park and Calderstones Park, are also nearby. The Millennium Green, accessible from Penny Lane or Oakdale Road, is a small popular green space hosting wildflower fields and woods and is a popular dog walking area. Sudley House is one of seven museums and art galleries run by National Museums Liverpool, displaying paintings by Gainsborough and Turner, among others. Mossley Hill Athletic Club are a voluntary multi-sports club offering facilities for archery, crown green bowling, cricket, football, rugby, hockey, running, and tennis. There is also a women's football team, Mossley Hill LFC, who play in the Northern Combination Women's Football League.

Mossley Hill railway station on Rose Lane and West Allerton railway station on Booker Avenue are located in Mossley Hill. Both stations offer regular services to Liverpool city centre (an approx 11 minute journey time), Warrington (27 minute journey) and Manchester Oxford Road (a 57-minute journey). There are connections to Birmingham via Liverpool South Parkway.

Spire Hospital Liverpool, formerly Lourdes Hospital, on Greenbank Road is Liverpool's first private hospital. It faces Greenbank Park.

Mossley Hill has one mosque called the Islamic Institute and numerous churches, including Anglican parishes (St Matthew and St James and St Barnabas), Roman Catholic parishes (St Anthony of Padua), and four Free Churches (Dovedale Baptist Church, Allerton United Reformed, Elm Hall Drive Methodist, and Bethel Presbyterian Church in Wales). Dove Community Church ceased to exist in 2006 and was replaced by Wavertree Christian Fellowship. Another church in the area is Ramilies Road Chapel.

== Penny Lane ==
Mossley Hill became famous when the Beatles' song "Penny Lane", written about the Mossley Hill street of the same name, was released in 1967. The street receives thousands of annual tourist visits. The street was also briefly the home of singer Freddie Mercury during his pre-Queen days in 1969, when he lived above the Dovedale Towers pub while fronting a local band called Ibex.

== Notable residents ==
- Kim Cattrall, actress, born in Mossley Hill and grew up there for three months
- J. Bruce Ismay, director of the White Star Line and Titanic survivor
- Charles Lawrence, Mayor of Liverpool, lived in Carnatic Hall
- Danielle Lloyd, model and former Miss Great Britain, grew up on Penny Lane
- Freddie Mercury, lead singer of Queen, lived above the Dovedale Towers pub on Penny Lane while fronting local band Ibex in 1969
- Clive Barker, writer and filmmaker, attended Dovedale Primary School and 24th Picton Scouts on Gorsedale Road.
- Derek Nimmo, actor, grew up in Mossley Hill
- Steven Pienaar, former footballer for Everton FC
- R. M. Qualtrough, the fake name given by an unknown person who convinced William Herbert Wallace to travel to a non-existent Mossley Hill address to discuss insurance in January 1931, during which time Wallace's wife Julia was murdered at their Anfield home
- Bertram Fletcher Robinson, journalist, author, sportsman and political activist
- Darci Shaw, actress
- The Rathbone family, shipowners
- Russell Pritchard, musician, bassist of The Zutons and Noel Gallagher's High Flying Birds
- Thelo Aasgaard, footballer, Rangers and Norway national football team, grew up in Mossley Hill
