= St Ambrose Church, Widnes =

Church in the United Kingdom

Coordinates: 53.3725°N 2.7123°W

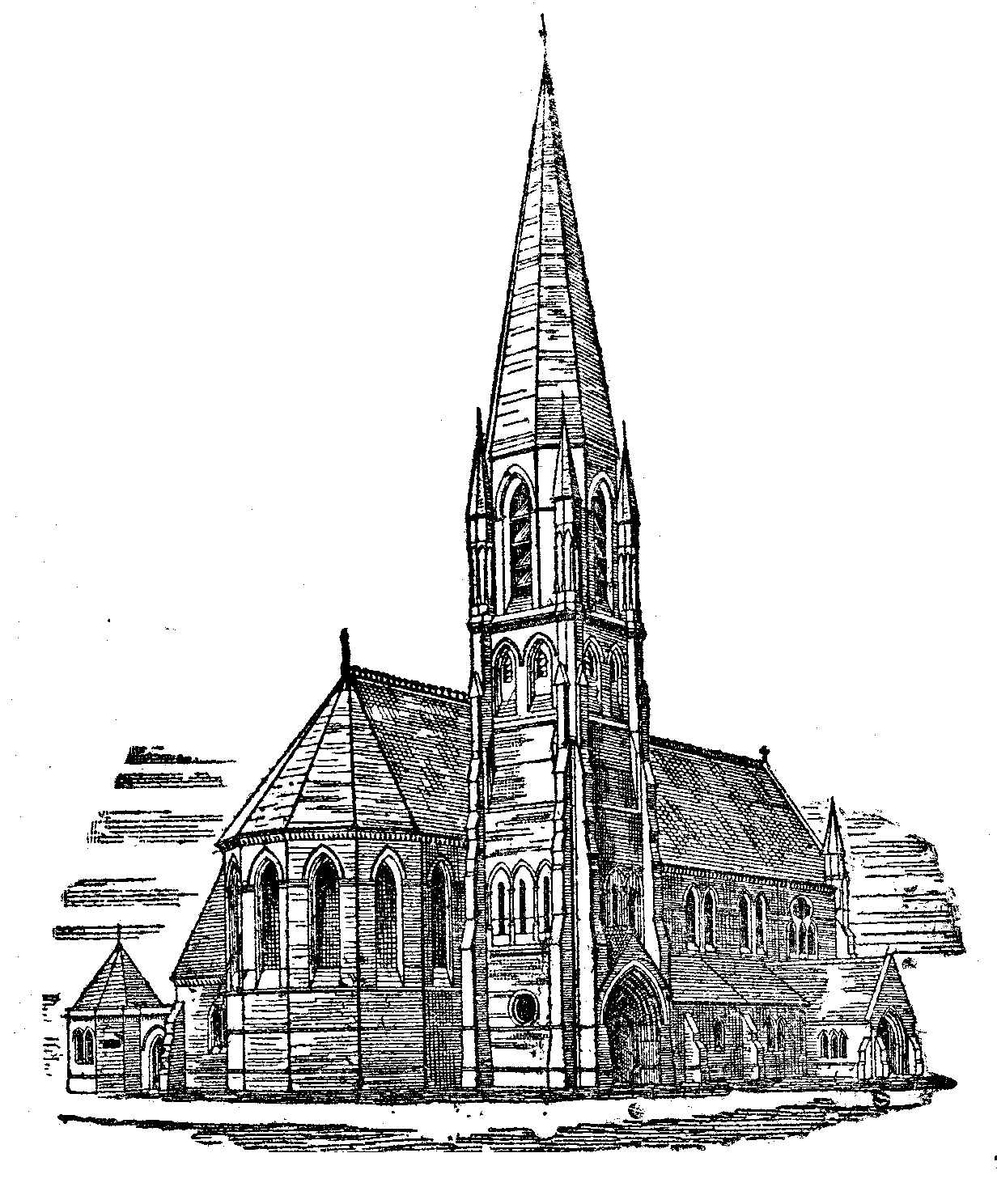
St Ambrose Church

St Ambrose Church, in Widnes, England, was built in 1882 to a design by James Francis Doyle of Liverpool (c. 1840–1913).

== The first building ==
Widnes in the 1870s was a rapidly growing chemical town, with all the problems associated with such growth. Living conditions were poor, houses were overcrowded, brawling was common, drunkenness was rife, and murders were not unknown. On 13 May 1878 it was decided to build a 320-seat church in Halton View on a 1-acre (4,000 m^{2}) site presented by Mr. John Bibby, land-owner. The Page Lane Mission was built first and opened on 16 February 1879.

== The present building ==
It was soon evident that a larger church would be required and accommodation was sought for 520 people. St Ambrose Church was designed by James Francis Doyle, whose principal area of activity was in Liverpool and the Wirral. At least part of the cost was funded by the Incorporated Church Building Society. The foundation stone was set by the Home Secretary, the Rt. Hon. R. Assheton Cross M.P., during a service conducted by the Vicar of Farnworth on 8 October 1879. St Ambrose was opened on Monday 28 March 1881, with the chancel unfinished. The consecration took place on 6 December 1883, when the building was finally paid for. The total cost was £5150, which did not include the cost of the many gifts to the church.

== Features ==
The floor plan of the church is in the traditional gothic style, oriented east-to-west, with a nave and two side aisles, a chancel and an apse-shaped east end. The nave has five arches supported on pillars, with clerestory windows above the arches. The chancel roof is the same height as the nave. The vestry and organ are off the chancel on the south side. A copy of the original ground-plan as Doyle designed it can be found on the Church Plans Online site. There are three stained glass windows including one by Caroline Townshend at the west end of the nave depicting Mary greeting the risen Christ, the woman who anointed Jesus' feet with ointment and the widow casting her mite into the temple treasury. The centre light of the east window depicts Jesus as the Good Shepherd, with war memorial windows either side showing St Ambrose and St George. The window in the fourth arch of the south aisle arcade was given by German former prisoners of war in 1947 in recognition of the hospitality of this church to them before their release to return home. It depicts St Boniface the (English-born) patron saint of Germany.

The octagonal vestry shown in outline on the plans was eventually built, but the tower shown in the drawing above was not, and the only evidence in the building itself that there was to have been a tower is the "blind" arch on the north side of the chancel, and the "blind" door at the east end of the north aisle. At a later (unknown) date, a lean-to was added to the octagonal vestry to house a toilet and storage for tools for churchyard maintenance. The outside door to the tools store has since been sealed up, presumably due to vandalism.

== Later works ==
In more recent years alterations have been made to both the interior and the exterior to bring it further into line with contemporary uses and legal requirements. In the 1980s pews were removed and carpet laid at the back of the building to create a space for circulating around the font. In 2001 a disabled access ramp in brick and york stone was added to a design by Robin Wolley, architect, of Ruthin. In 2008 the rear arch on each side of the nave was enclosed to create a kitchen on the south side and toilets (including one accessible for disabled people) on the north side, to a design by Snape Cowing Architects of Ormskirk. In 2011 the entire heating system was replaced. The Victorian 4" bore cast iron pipes and 1960s gas boilers had reached the end of their useful life and the building is now heated with a state-of-the-art pair of boilers, new pipework and radiators.

== Vicars of St Ambrose ==
The parish has had 12 vicars to date:

- Sherley Allan Spooner M.A. 1884–1888
- George Antonius Le Bert M.A. 1888–1898
- Thomas Simcox Lea D.D. 1899–1904
- Herbert Payne Hiscoke M.A. 1904–1913
- Willian Robert Johnson M.A. 1913–1919
- George Gordon Dawson M.A., B.D. (Cantab.), Ph.D. (London), Surrogate 1919–1932
- Joseph Hignett Banks M.A. 1932–1955
- Sydney Thomas Goddard 1955–1959
- Laurence Hoyle 1959–1961
- Norman Francis Lionel Williams 1961–1978
- Paul Terence Jones B.A. 1978–2000
- Jeremy Paul Leffler B.Ed., B.Th. 2000–2012

In 2012 it is proposed to form a team with the parishes of St John, Widnes and St Luke, Farnworth with Cronton, where the clergy will be shared between the four churches (including Cronton Mission) and an eventual transition from three to two clergy will be managed gradually.
