= St Nicholas Church, Wallasey =

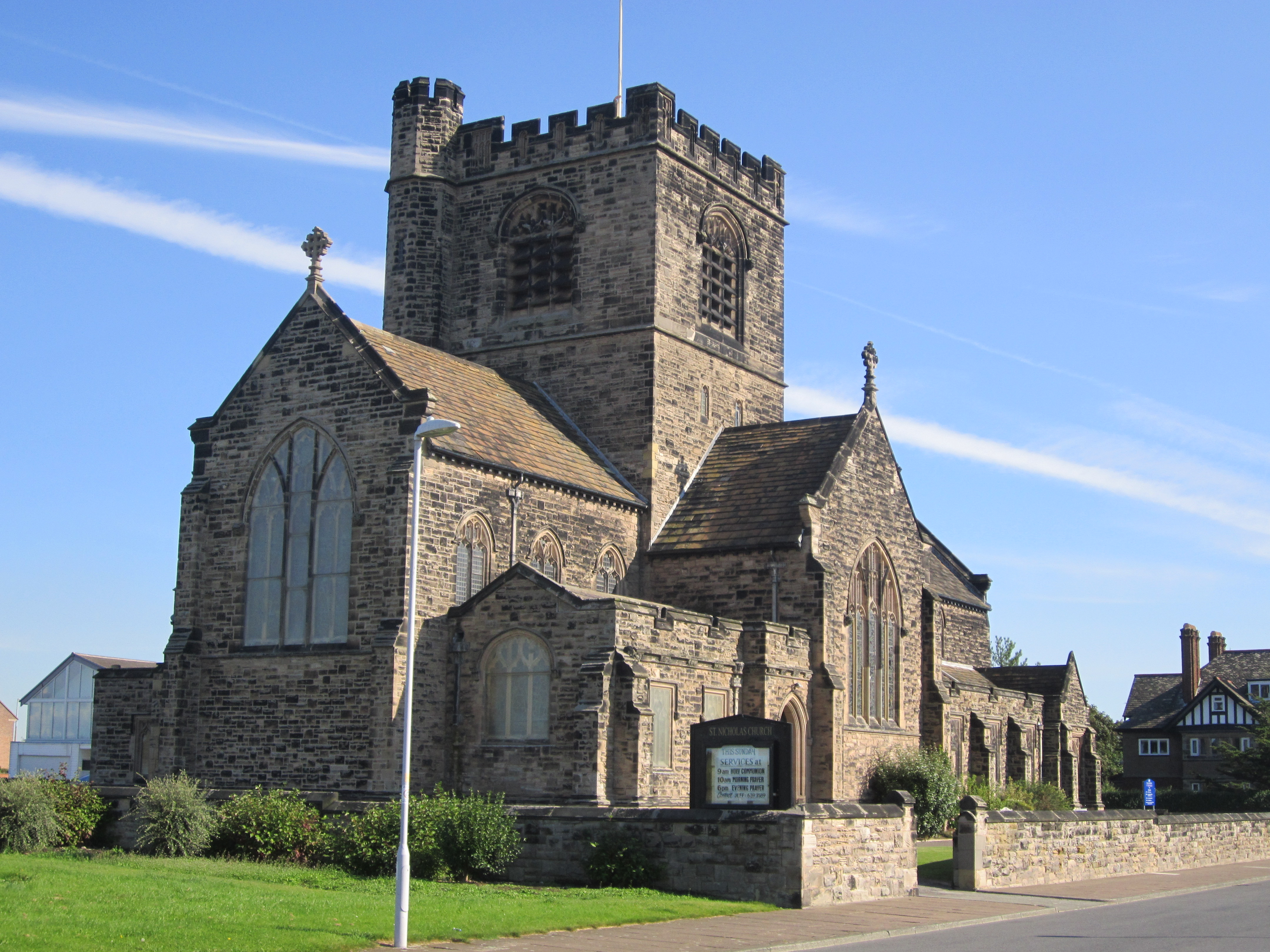
- St Nicholas Church

- Location in Merseyside
- 53.4294°N 3.0716°W
- OS grid reference: SJ 28894 93058
- Location: Newport Avenue, Wallasey, Wirral, Merseyside
- Country: England
- Denomination: Anglican
- Website: St Nicholas, Wallasey

History
- Status: Parish church

Architecture
- Functional status: Active
- Heritage designation: Grade II
- Designated: 21 July 2005
- Architect: J. F. Doyle
- Architectural type: Church
- Style: Gothic Revival
- Groundbreaking: 1910
- Completed: 1911
- Construction cost: £15,000

Specifications
- Capacity: Up to 700
- Length: 128 feet 6 inches (39.2 m)
- Width: 54 feet (16.5 m)
- Materials: Storeton sandstone Yorkshire stone flag roof

Administration
- Province: York
- Diocese: Chester
- Archdeaconry: Chester
- Deanery: Wallasey
- Parish: Wallasey St Nicholas with All Saints

Clergy
- Vicar: Revd Jeff Staples

St Nicholas Church is an active Anglican parish church in the diocese of Chester on Newport Avenue, in Wallasey, in Wirral, England. It was designed by J. F. Doyle and built in 1910–11. The church is located near Wallasey Golf Club and is known as the Harrison Memorial Church or the Golfers' Church. It is recorded in the National Heritage List for England as a designated Grade II listed building.

== History ==
Funding for the church was donated by members of the local Harrison family, and it was designed by the Liverpool architect J. F. Doyle. The foundation stone was laid by a member of the Harrison family on 26 April 1910. The church cost £15,000 to build and provided seating for up to 700 people. It was consecrated by the Rt Revd Francis Jayne, Bishop of Chester on 29 November 1911. It is known as the Harrison Memorial Church and, because of its proximity to Wallasey Golf Club, as the Golfers' Church.

== Architecture ==
=== Exterior ===
St Nicholas Church is built in Storeton sandstone and is roofed with Yorkshire stone flags. The church is orientated in the opposite direction from the usual liturgical orientation, with its chancel at the west end. It is built on sand and therefore stands on a raft of steel and concrete. The church has a cruciform plan, with a central tower above the crossing, a nave and a chancel, both with clerestories, north and south aisles, north and south transepts, north and south porches, a chancel, a south Lady Chapel, and a north vestry. The tower has louvred bell openings, a battlemented parapet, and an octagonal stair turret on the northwest corner. The windows contain curvilinear tracery. Carvings by Norbury and Sons are located around the doors and windows and along the sides of the church. These include depictions of King George V and Queen Mary, King Edward I and Queen Eleanor, and foliage, seaweed, a dragon, and a medieval monk.

=== Interior ===
Inside the church, the arcades have quatrefoil piers, pointed arches, and capitals with carvings that include the Four Evangelists, a ship, an anchor, seaweed, and the emblems of Saint Nicholas. There are also carvings of Solomon and the Queen of Sheba, Saint Peter, and Saint Nicholas. In the chancel are carvings of cherubs and angels, and wooden corbels carved with seaweed, fish, a cross, an anchor, a heart, and a crown. The oak reredos was designed by Doyle; it is 15 feet (4.6 m) high and is intricately decorated. In the central panel are carvings of Christ on the cross flanked by the Virgin Mary and Saint John, and the outer panels contain angels. The canopy is elaborately decorated and has pinnacles, crockets, and openwork. The lectern is in the form of an eagle, and its pedestal stands on the backs of three lions. The pulpit is approached by seven steps and contains carved panels. The wooden font stands on two steps and has an octagonal bowl on a quatrefoil shaft; its panels are carved with symbols relating to baptism.

There are two screens, each a memorial to one of the World Wars. The stained glass in the windows is by Shrigley and Hunt, to designs by Carl Almquist, E. H. Jewitt and others. In the north transept is the Harrison Window, which depicts Christ preaching from a ship and the draught of fishes. On the north side is a war memorial window showing a fallen soldier wearing a kilt, with Reims Cathedral in the background. Another window, known as the Parkin Window or the Golfers' Window, includes depictions of golfers with their golf bags and Liverpool landmarks. The ring consists of eight bells. Six of these were cast in 1911 by John Warner & Sons, and the other two date from 1977 and were cast by the Whitechapel Bell Foundry. The three-manual pipe organ was made in 1911 by John Nicholson of Worcester. It was modified in about 1975 by John Cowin of Liverpool, and again in about 1995 by Keith Ledson, also of Liverpool.

== Appraisal ==
The church was designated as a Grade II listed building on 21 July 2005. Grade II is the lowest of the three grades of listing and is applied to buildings that are "nationally important and of special interest".

== Present day ==
St Nicholas is an active Anglican parish church in the deanery of Wallasey, the archdeaconry of Chester, and the diocese of Chester. It is sited near Wallasey Golf Club. Services are held in the church each Sunday. In December 2022 the church offered support sessions to anyone directly affected in the aftermath of the Wallasey pub shooting being only five minutes walk from the location of the incident, and on 25 January 2023 it was the venue of the funeral of the only fatal casualty of the shooting Elle Edwards.

== See also ==
- Listed buildings in Wallasey
