= St Barnabas' Church, Mossley Hill =

Coordinates: 53.3886°N 2.9149°W

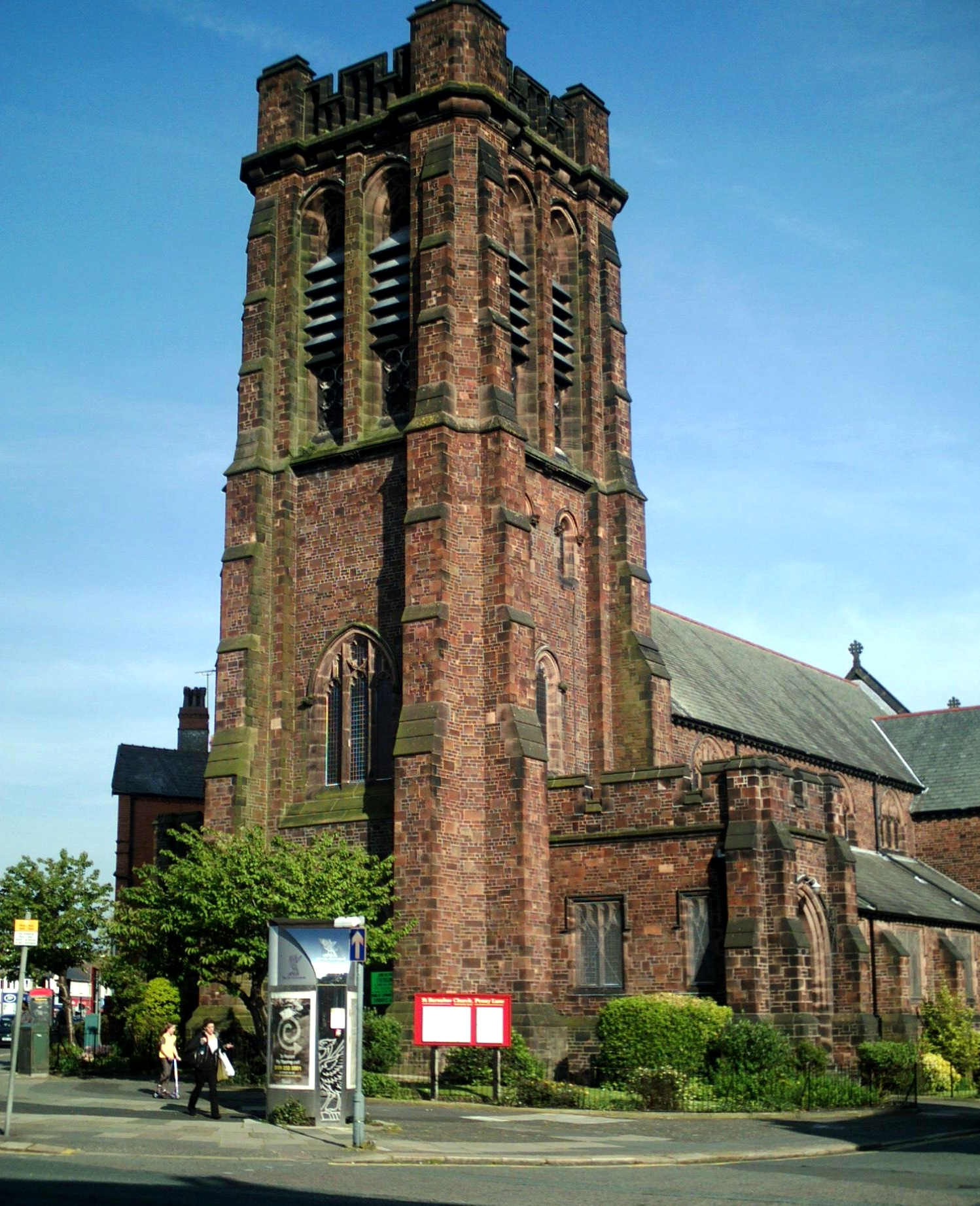
- St Barnabas' Church, Mossley Hill, from the southwest

- Location in Merseyside
- OS grid reference: SJ 393 884
- Location: Smithdown Place, Mossley Hill, Liverpool, Merseyside
- Country: England
- Denomination: Anglican
- Website: St Barnabas, Mossley Hill

History
- Status: Parish church

Architecture
- Functional status: Active
- Heritage designation: Grade II
- Designated: 19 June 1985
- Architect: James Francis Doyle
- Architectural type: Church
- Style: Gothic Revival (Perpendicular)
- Groundbreaking: 1900
- Completed: 1914
- Construction cost: £14,000

Specifications
- Materials: Brick with sandstone dressings, slate roof

Administration
- Province: York
- Diocese: Liverpool
- Archdeaconry: Liverpool
- Deanery: Liverpool South Childwall
- Parish: Penny Lane St Barnabas

Clergy
- Vicar: Alex Rayment

St Barnabas' Church is in Smithdown Place, Mossley Hill, Liverpool, Merseyside, England. It stands at the junction of Allerton Road, Smithdown Road, and Penny Lane. It is an active Anglican parish church in the deanery of Liverpool South Childwall, the archdeaconry of Liverpool, and the diocese of Liverpool. The church is recorded in the National Heritage List for England as a designated Grade II listed building.

== History ==
St Barnabas' was built between 1900 and 1914, and designed by the Liverpool architect James Francis Doyle. Before 1914 the congregation met in a temporary iron church. The architect died before the building was completed and the church was finished under the supervision of his brother Sydney W. Doyle. The church building cost £14,000 and, with the internal fittings, its total cost was about £25,000 (equivalent to £2,490,000 in 2025). In the 1960s pews were removed from the east end of the nave, and a nave altar and communion rails were installed. A small kitchen was added to the rear of the church in 1999, and since then more pews have been removed to create an open space at the west end of the nave.

== Architecture ==
=== Exterior ===
The church is built in specially moulded bricks of various sizes, with red sandstone dressings, and the roof is of slate. The architectural style is Perpendicular. Inside, the columns are in Storeton stone. The plan of the church consists of a four-bay nave with a clerestory, north and south aisles under lean-to roofs, two south porches, north and south transepts, a chancel with a south chapel and a northeast vestry, and a west tower. The tower has a west entrance, above which is a three-light window. The bell openings are paired with louvres, and above them is a cornice and an arcaded embattled parapet. The porches also have embattled parapets. The windows along the sides of the aisles and the clerestory have three lights, and those in the transepts and the chancel have five lights. The chapel windows have three lights, and those in the vestry have two and three lights.

=== Interior ===
Inside the church are five-bay arcades between the nave and aisles, and a three-bay arcade between the chancel and the chapel, the latter being more ornate than the former. In the east window is a war memorial in stained glass by H. G. Hiller. The two-manual pipe organ was built by Henry Willis & Sons, and there have been alterations and repairs since. The organ case was designed by Sydney W. Doyle. There is a ring of eight bells installed in 2010: the six largest bells were transferred from St James, Waterfoot, Lancashire, and the two smallest bells from elsewhere.

== Notable members ==
- Paul McCartney said on The Late Late Show with James Corden that he sang in the choir of St Barnabas' Church when he was young. A brass plate on the Choir stalls of the Church was installed to commemorate this.

== See also ==
- Grade II listed buildings in Liverpool-L18
