= Cornerstone Church Liverpool =

Coordinates: 53.3857°N 2.9181°W

Dovedale Baptist Church
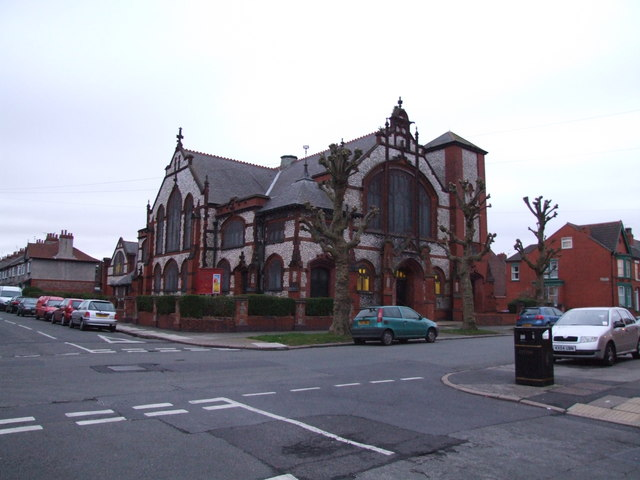
- Dovedale Baptist Church

- Location in Merseyside
- OS grid reference: SJ 390 880
- Location: Dovedale Road, Mossley Hill, Liverpool, Merseyside
- Country: England
- Churchmanship: Evangelical
- Website: http://cornerstonechurchliverpool.org

Architecture
- Functional status: Active
- Heritage designation: Grade II
- Designated: 19 June 1985
- Architect(s): George and R. P. Baines
- Architectural type: Church
- Style: Gothic Revival (Perpendicular)
- Groundbreaking: 1905
- Completed: 1906

Specifications
- Materials: Flint with brick and terracotta dressings, slate roof

Dovedale Baptist Church, (formerly Wavertree Baptist Church, sometimes referred to as Mossley Hill Baptist Church) is in Dovedale Road, Mossley Hill, Liverpool, Merseyside, England. It was an active Baptist church until 2018, and the church building is recorded in the National Heritage List for England as a designated Grade II listed building. In 2020 the building was bought by Cornerstone Church Liverpool and reopened on 4 April 2021.

== History ==
The church was built in 1905–06, and designed by George and R. P. Baines. It became an independent church with its own membership roll in 1908. When Myrtle Street Baptist Church closed in 1939, the site having been sold to make way for the building of the Liverpool Hospital for Cancer & Skin Diseases, their congregation and minister (Revd K.C. Dykes) joined with the church at Wavertree. In September 2018 the church held its final service and closed its doors as a Baptist church. The Baptist Union of Great Britain negotiated the sale of the building and in 2020 it was bought by Cornerstone Church Liverpool, reopening on 4 April 2021. They meet there regularly (Sunday Mornings) where they have an hour/hour and a half service with song, sermons and prayer.

== Architecture ==
=== Exterior ===
The church is faced with flint, which is an unusual building material in Liverpool, with dressings in red brick and terracotta. The roof is in slate with a cresting of red tiles. It has a T-shaped plan, consisting of a nave and transepts as wide as the nave, and a southwest tower. The tracery in the windows is Perpendicular in style. The entrance front is gabled, and contains a central doorway with a four-centred arch flanked by diagonal buttresses and two-light windows. Above this is a seven-light window. At the top of the gable are pinnacles and a traceried panel with gargoyles. This section is flanked on the left by a porch with a pyramidal roof, and on the right by the tower. The tower contains an entrance, above which is a three-light square-headed window, and over this are three-light square-headed bell openings. The tower had to be reduced in height in 1989 following concerns over structural stability; the current one is therefore truncated. The transepts are also gabled and contain two tiers of windows. Attached to the rear of the church is a hall with gables containing five-light windows.

=== Interior ===
Inside the church is a crossing with a four-centred arch on each side carried on thin quatrefoil columns. There is a central pulpit, in front of which is an immersion font and semicircular benches. Behind the pulpit is an organ. In the windows is coloured glass with Art Nouveau features. The three-manual pipe organ was made in 1906 by Hill, Norman and Beard.

== Present day ==
The church building is located on Dovedale Road, at the junction with Barndale Road on one side and Olivedale Road on the other. The main entrance to the church is on Dovedale Road with side entrances to the church hall on both Barndale Road and Olivedale Road. The church was in membership with the Baptist Union of Great Britain, the Evangelical Alliance and Churches Together in Mossley Hill. until it closed in 2018. Its minister from 1994 to 2011 was Wayne Clarke, who was also a BBC religious broadcaster. On Sundays, the church organised Morning Worship and a Sunday Club. During the week it arranged meetings for women, and for parents and toddlers. Brownies and Guides met in the church. Cornerstone Church Liverpool purchased the building in 2020 and meet there on Sunday mornings at 10:30 am for an hour/hour and a half service with a sermon, songs and prayer.

== See also ==
- Grade II listed buildings in Liverpool-L18
