= James Francis Doyle =

English architect

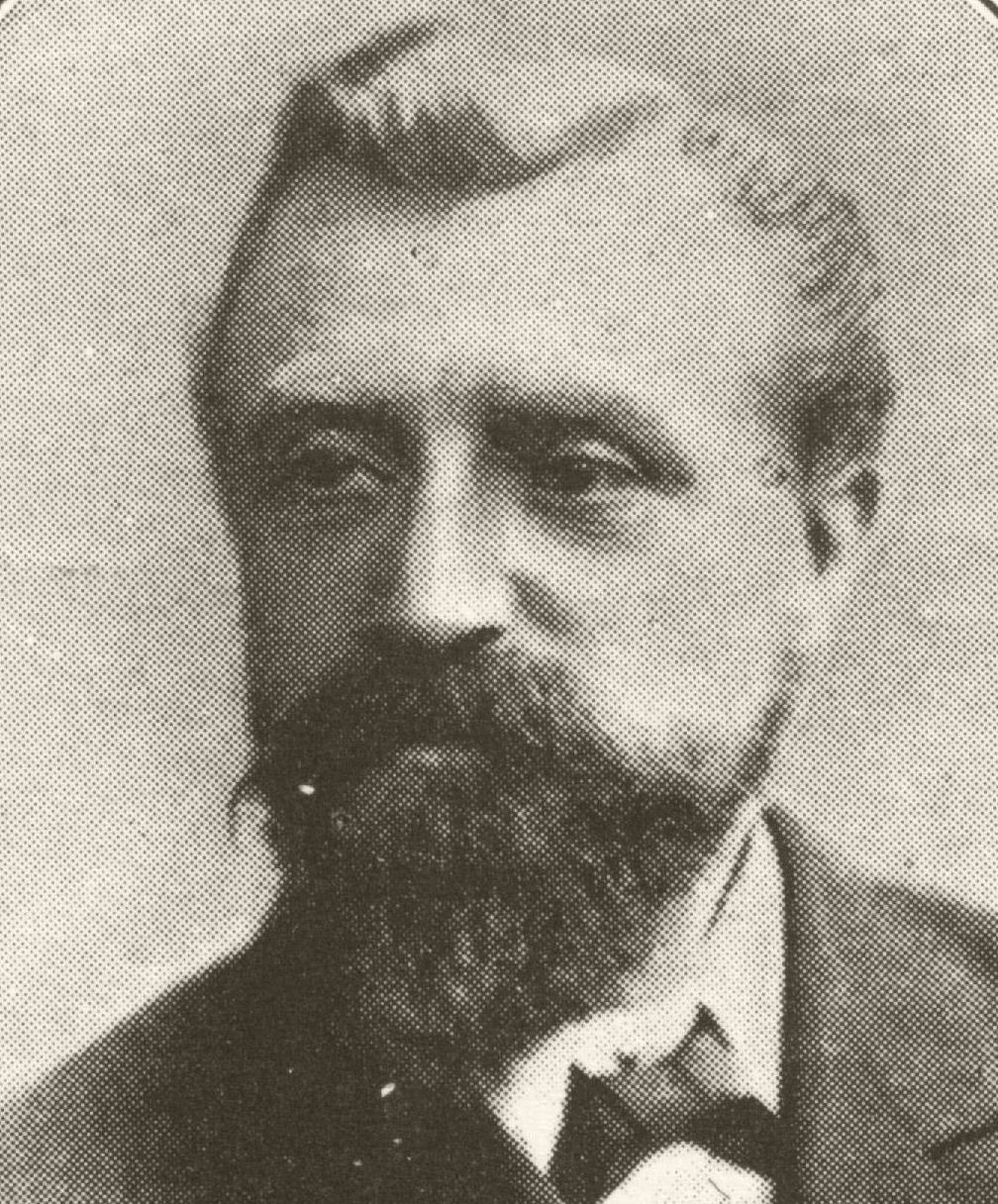
Doyle, in 1903

James Francis Doyle (1840, Liverpool – 1913, Warrington) was an English architect. He was the grandfather of the singing star Anne Ziegler.

== Buildings ==
Liverpool

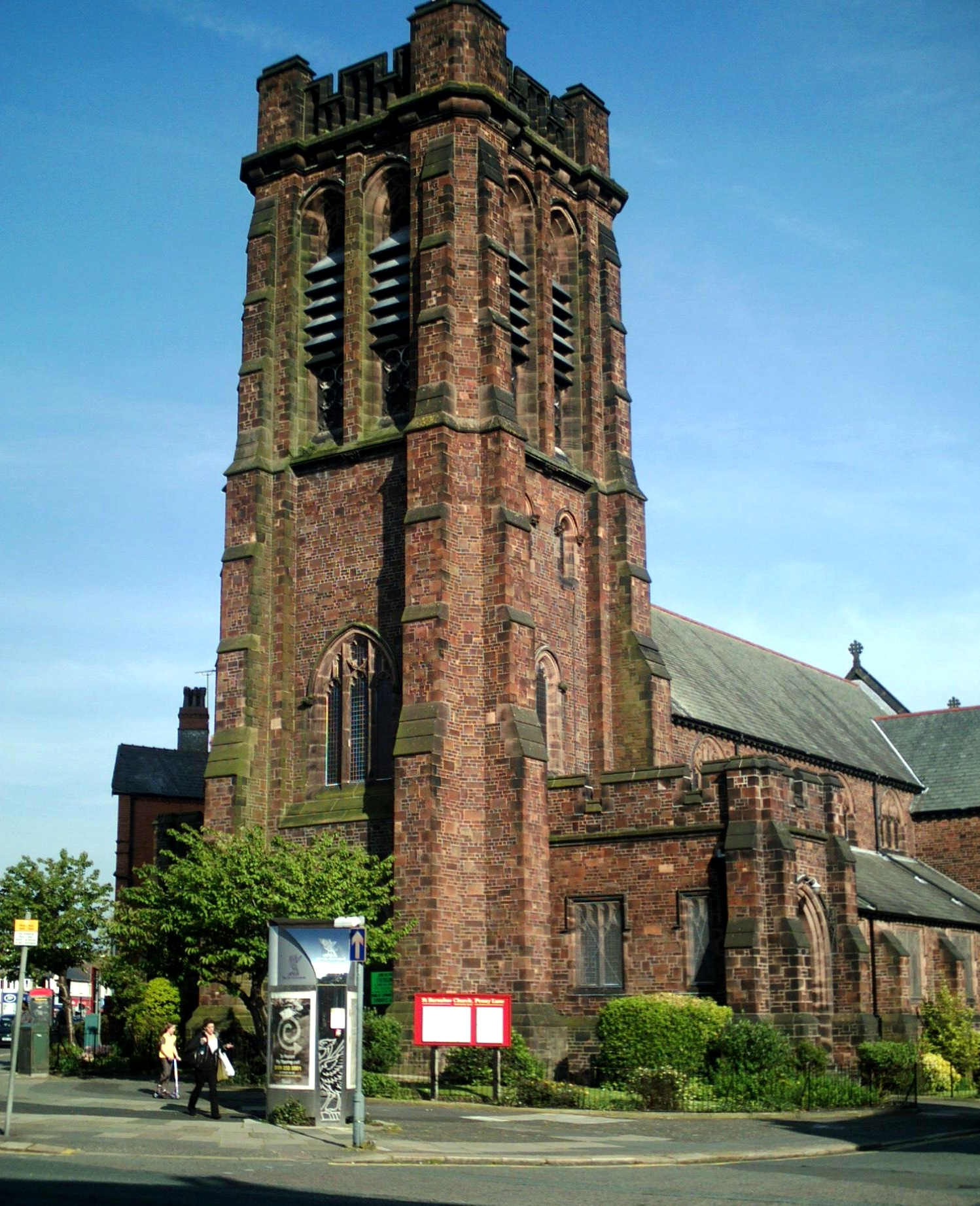
St Barnabas' Church, Mossley Hill

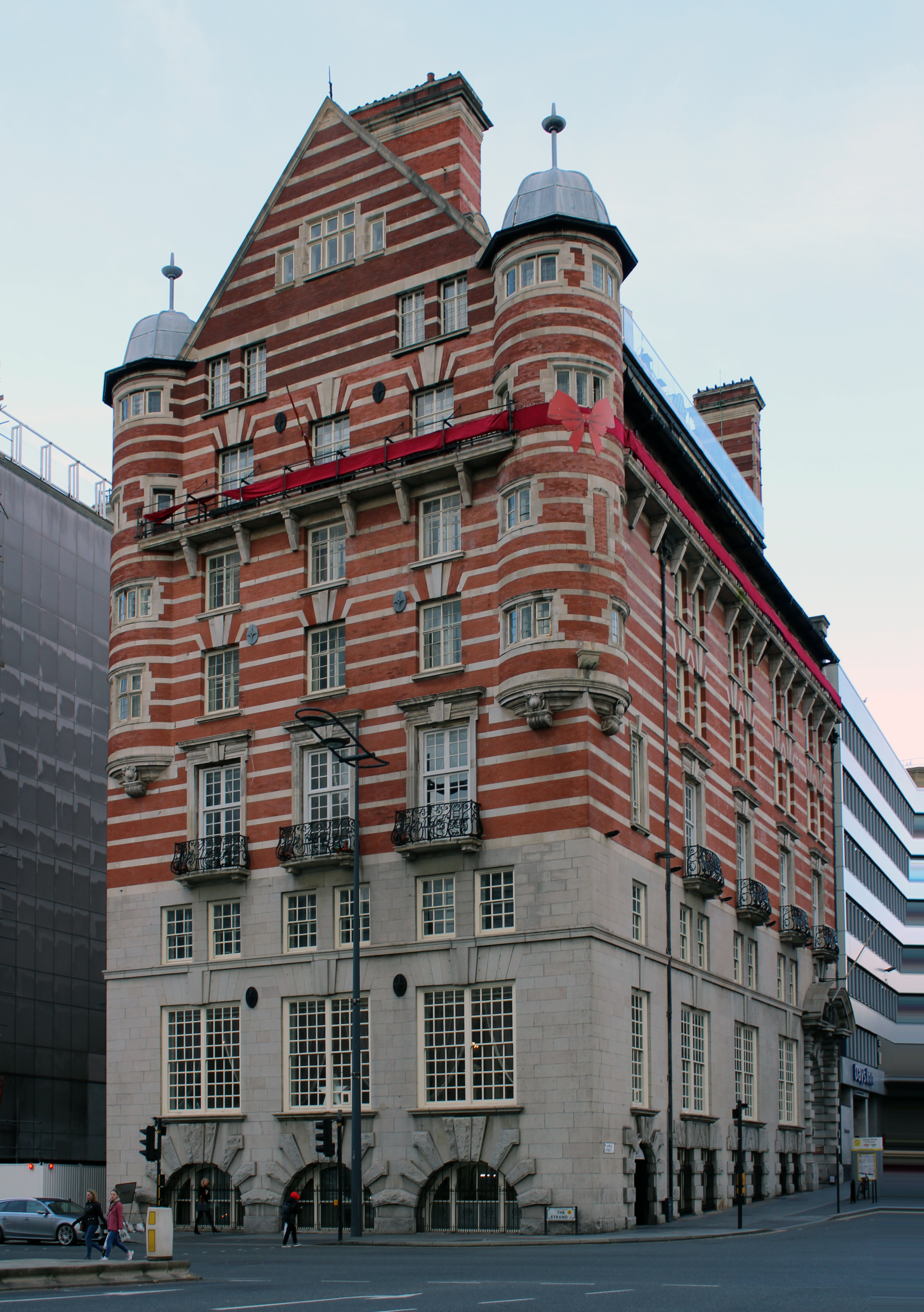
Albion House

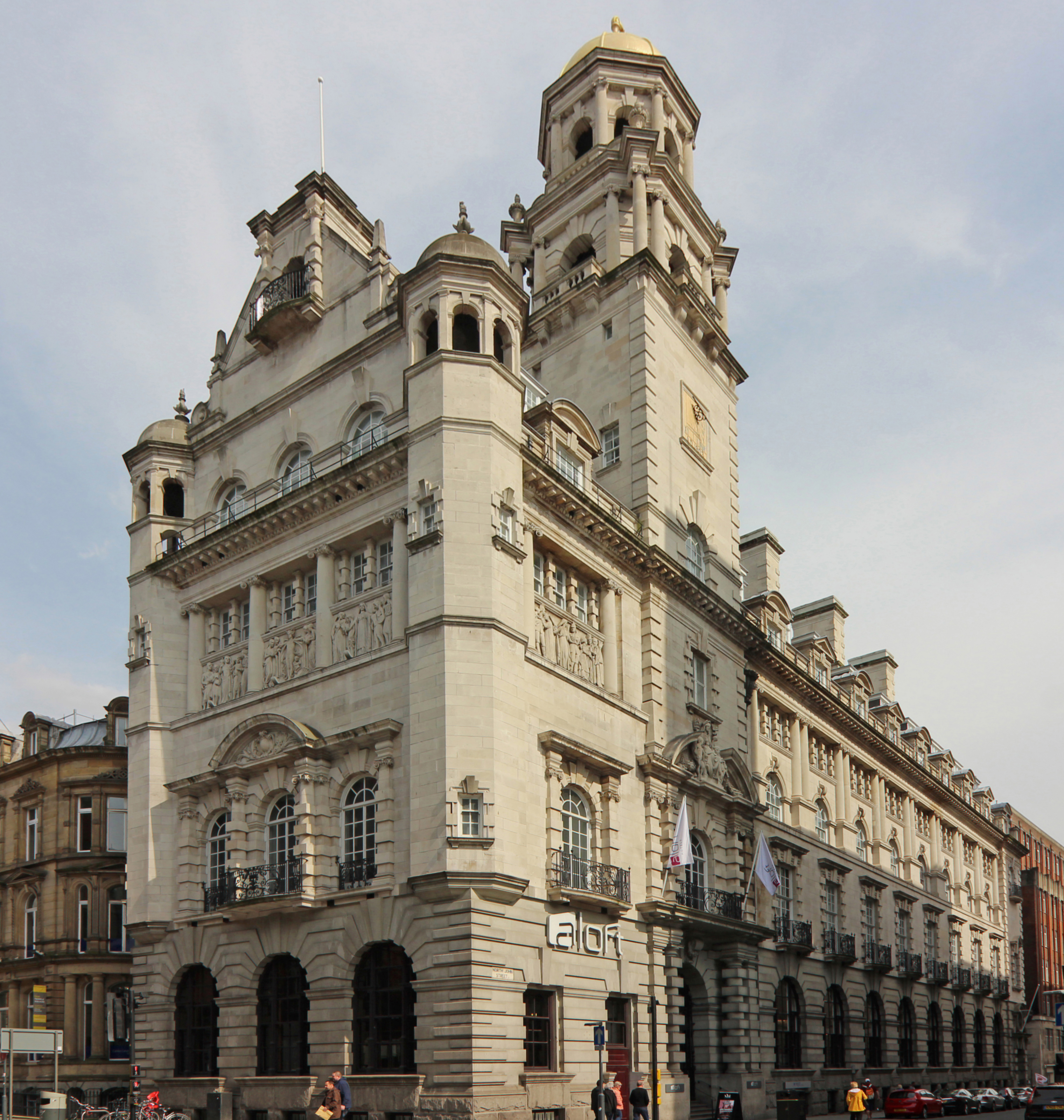
Royal Insurance Building

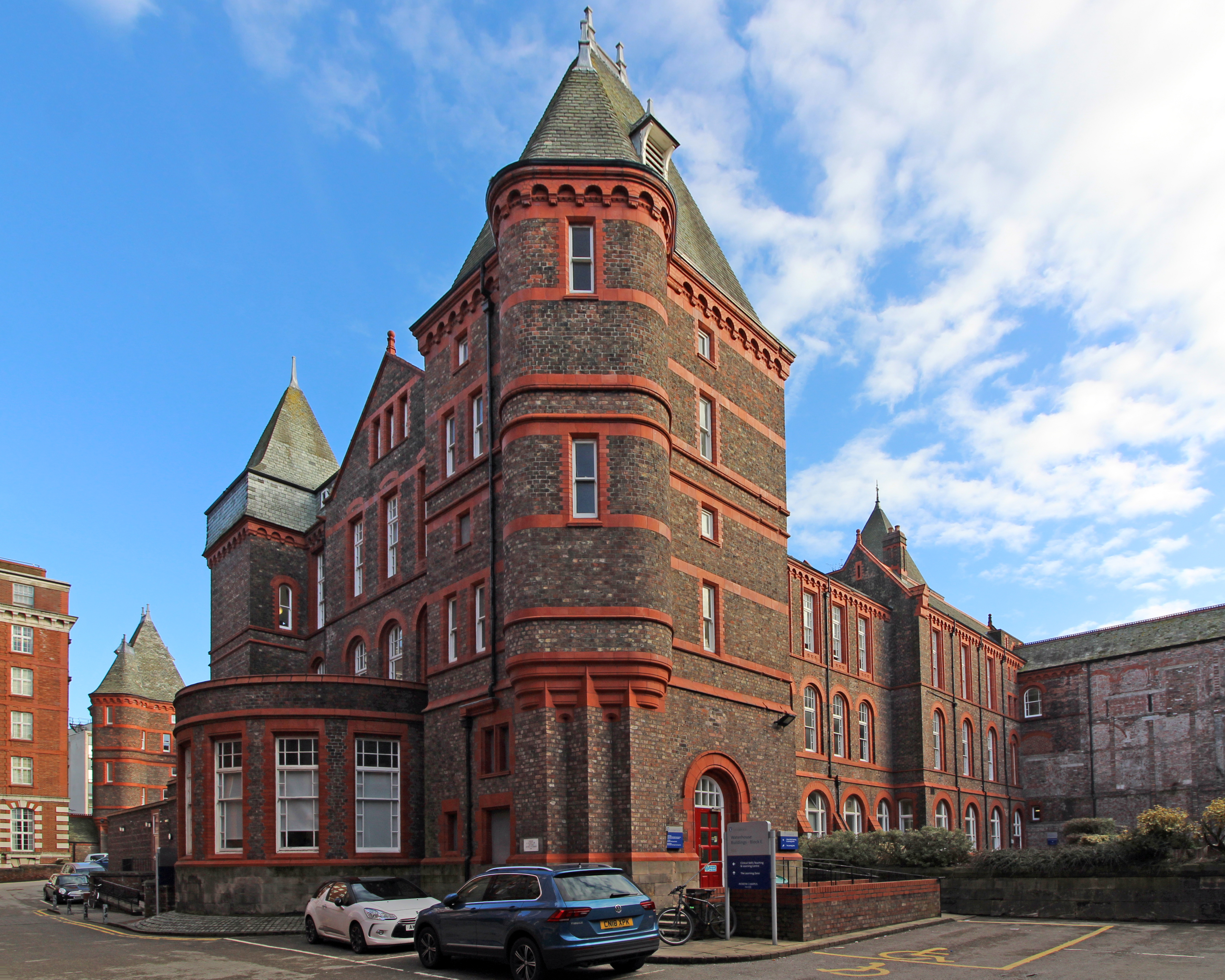
Liverpool Royal Infirmary, Outpatient department

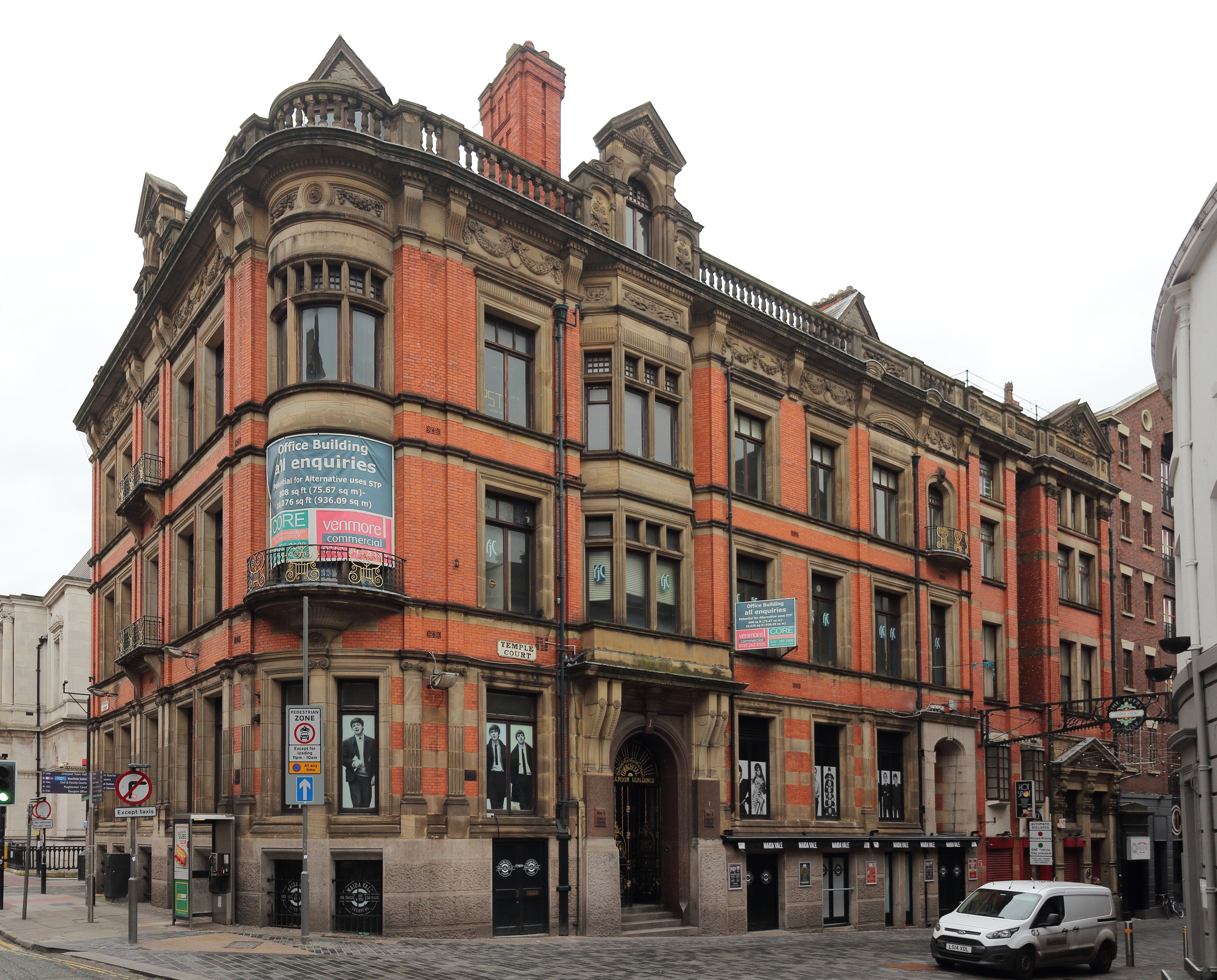
Commercial Saleroom Building, Temple Court

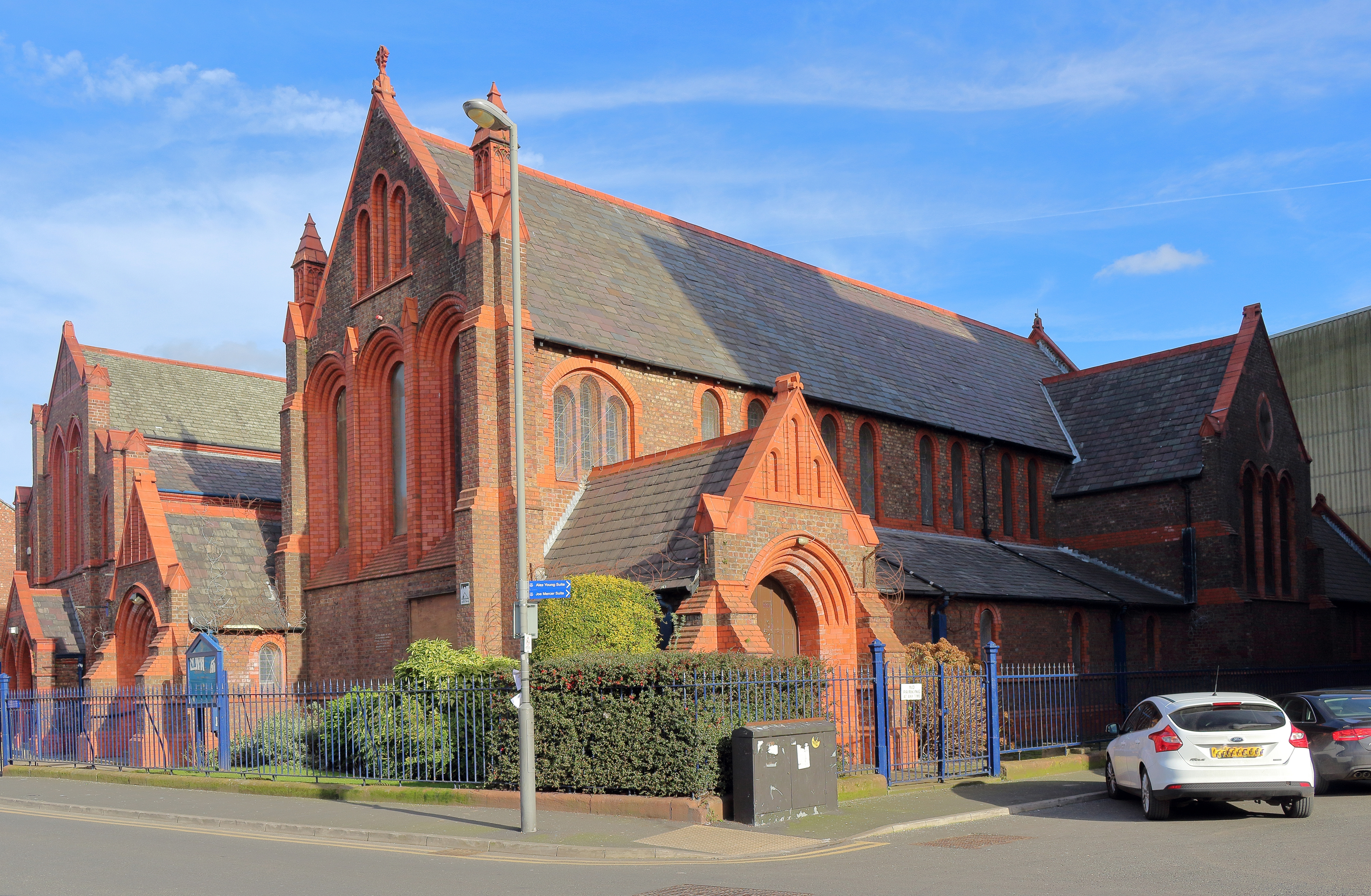
St Luke the Evangelist, Walton
Others

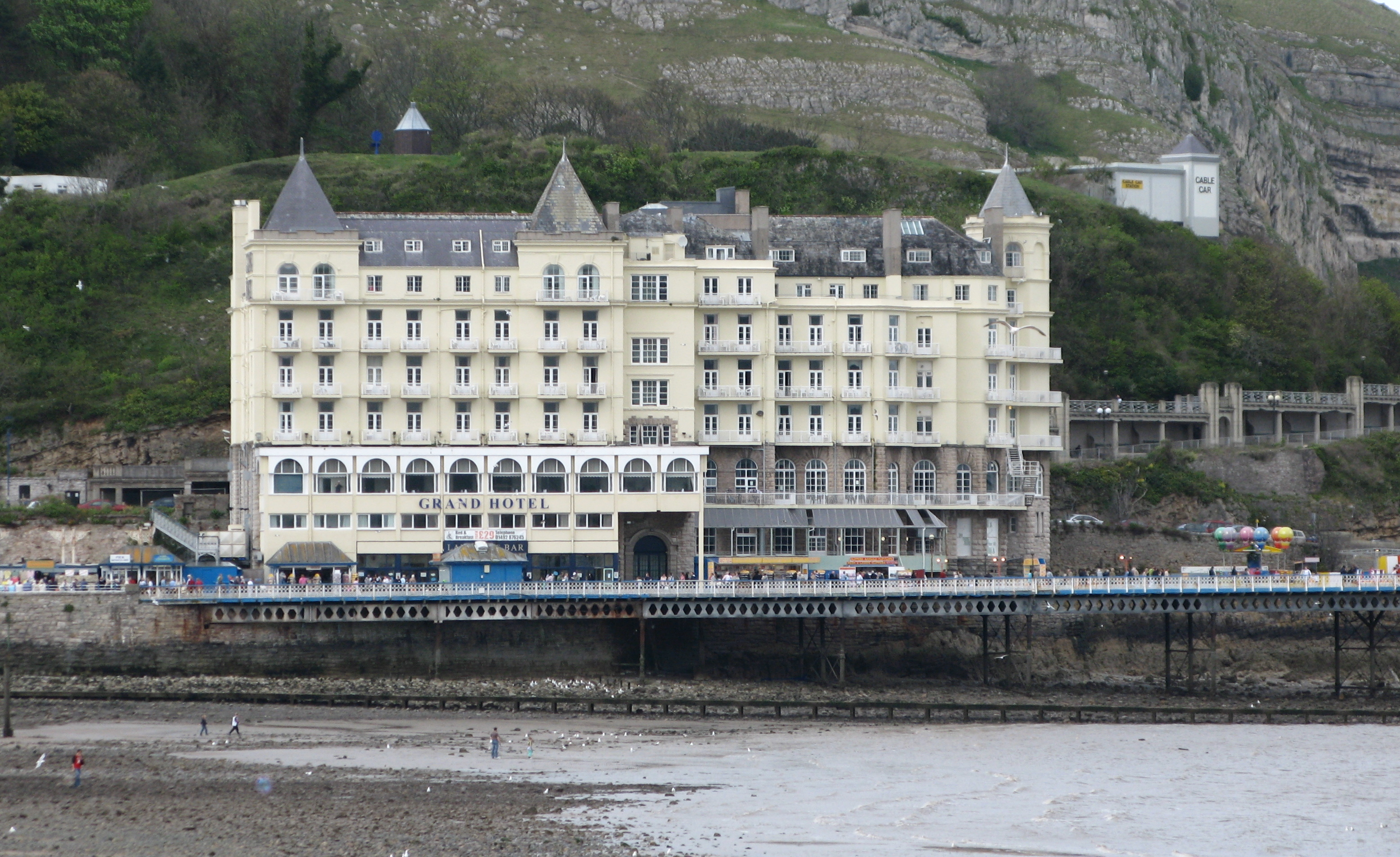
Grand Hotel, Llandudno

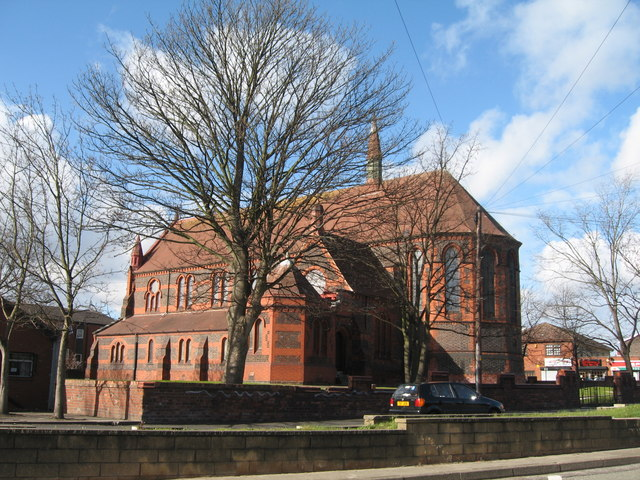
St Ambrose, Widnes.

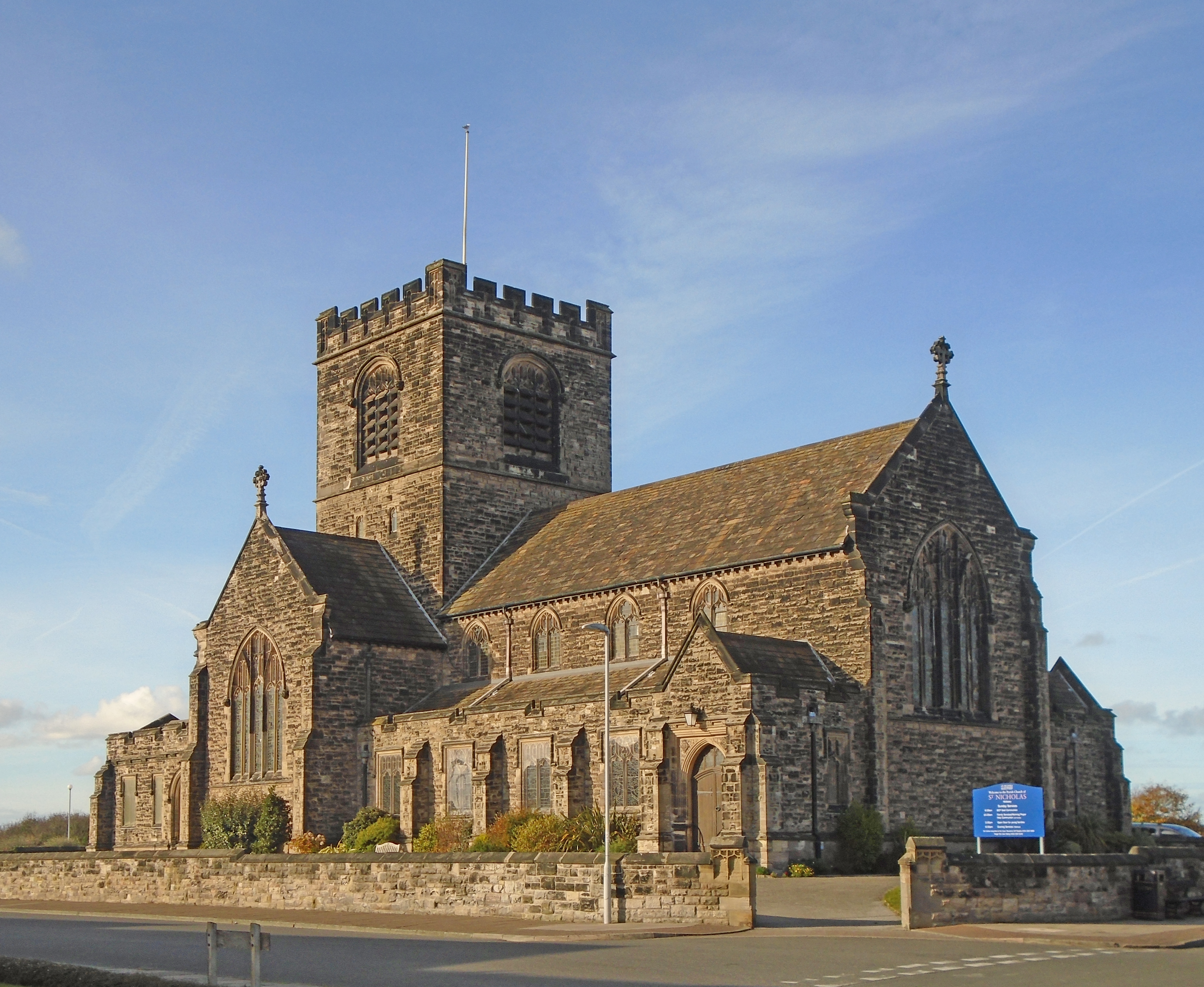
St Nicholas' Church, Wallasey

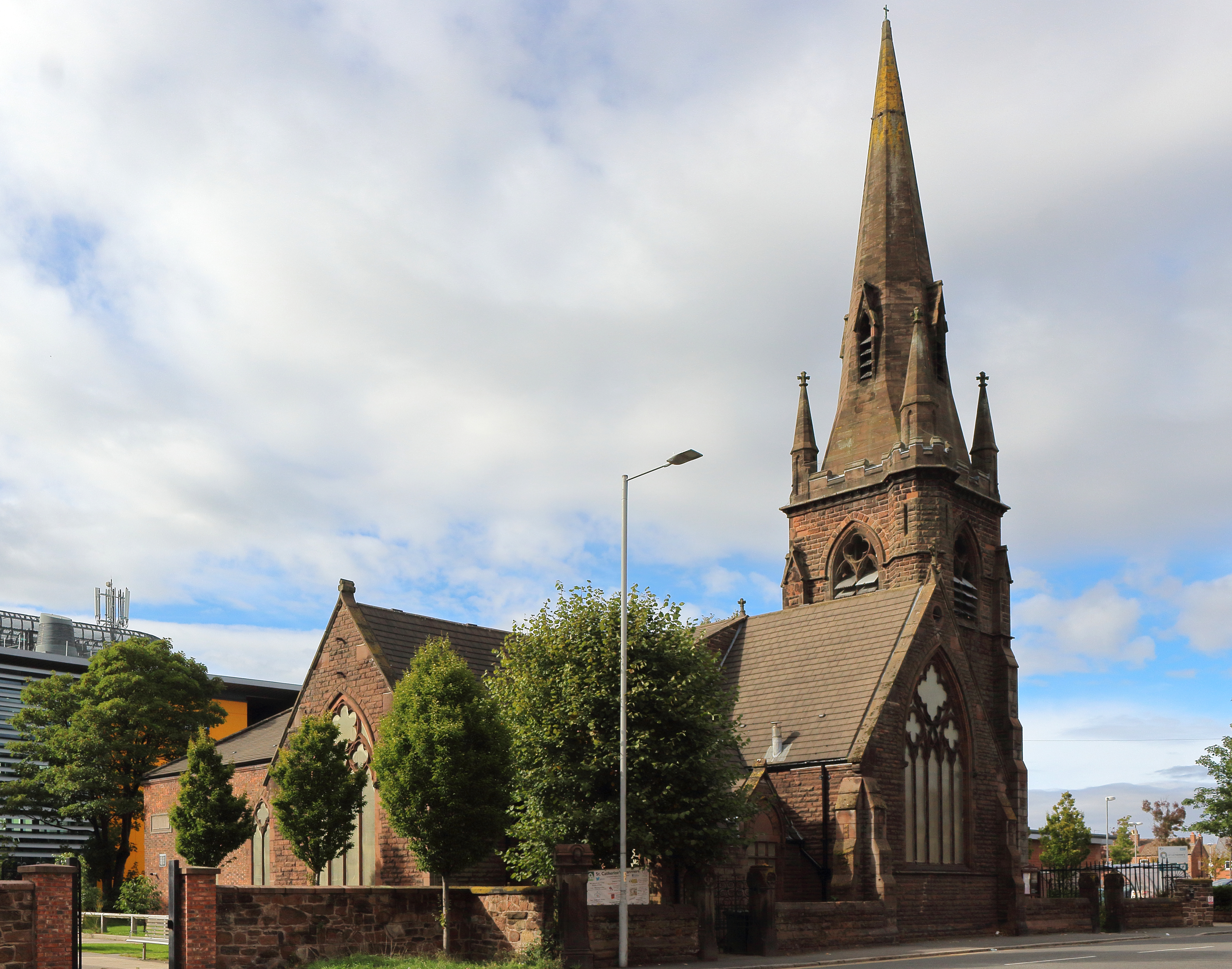
St. Catherine's church, Tranmere

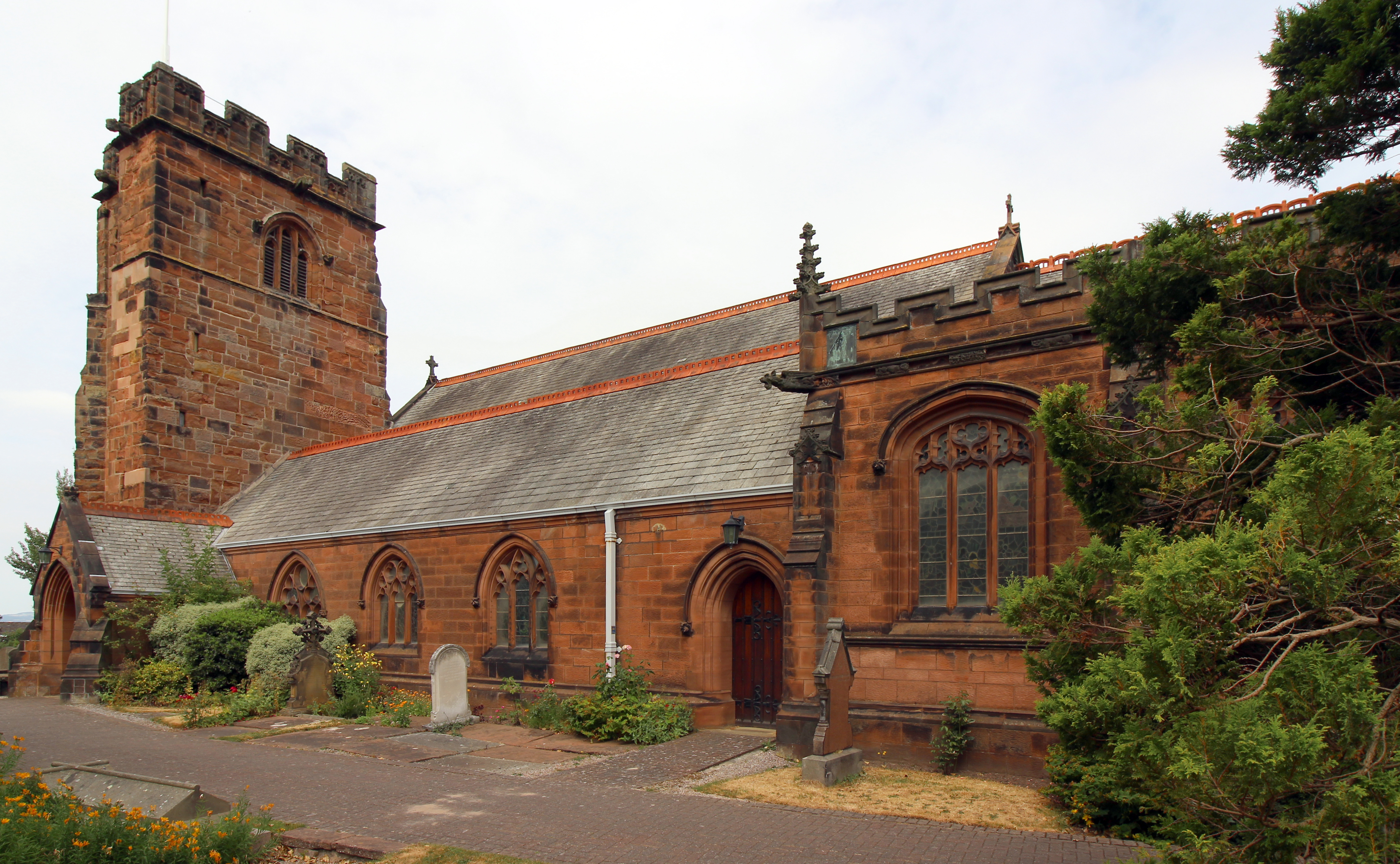
St. Peter's church, Heswall

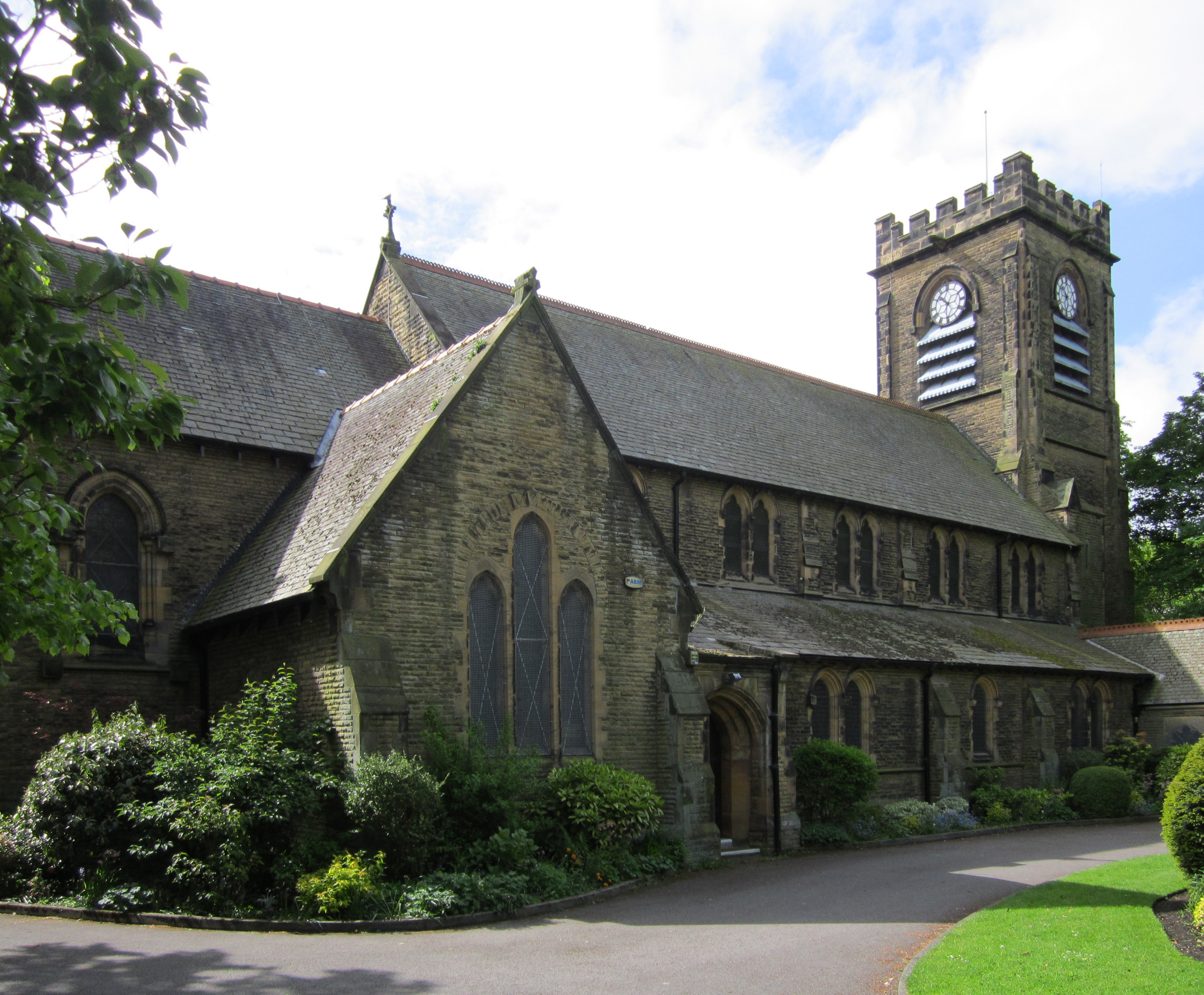
St. Andrew's church, Maghull

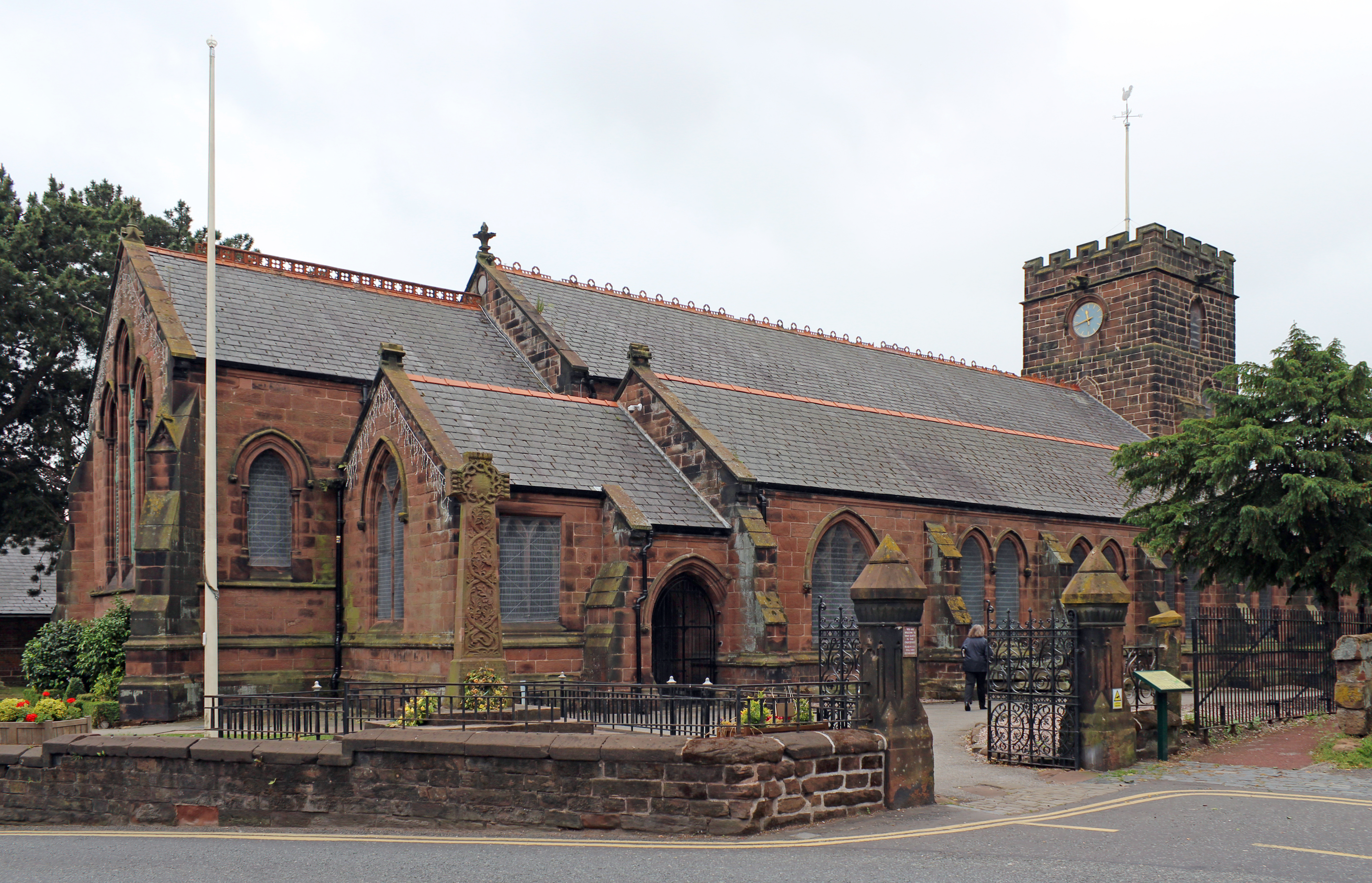
St. Mary & St. Helen's church, Neston

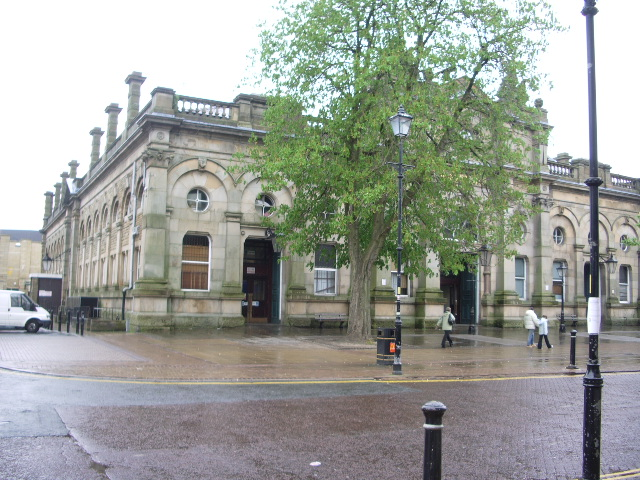
Accrington Market Hall (1888)
