= Church of St Matthew and St James, Mossley Hill =

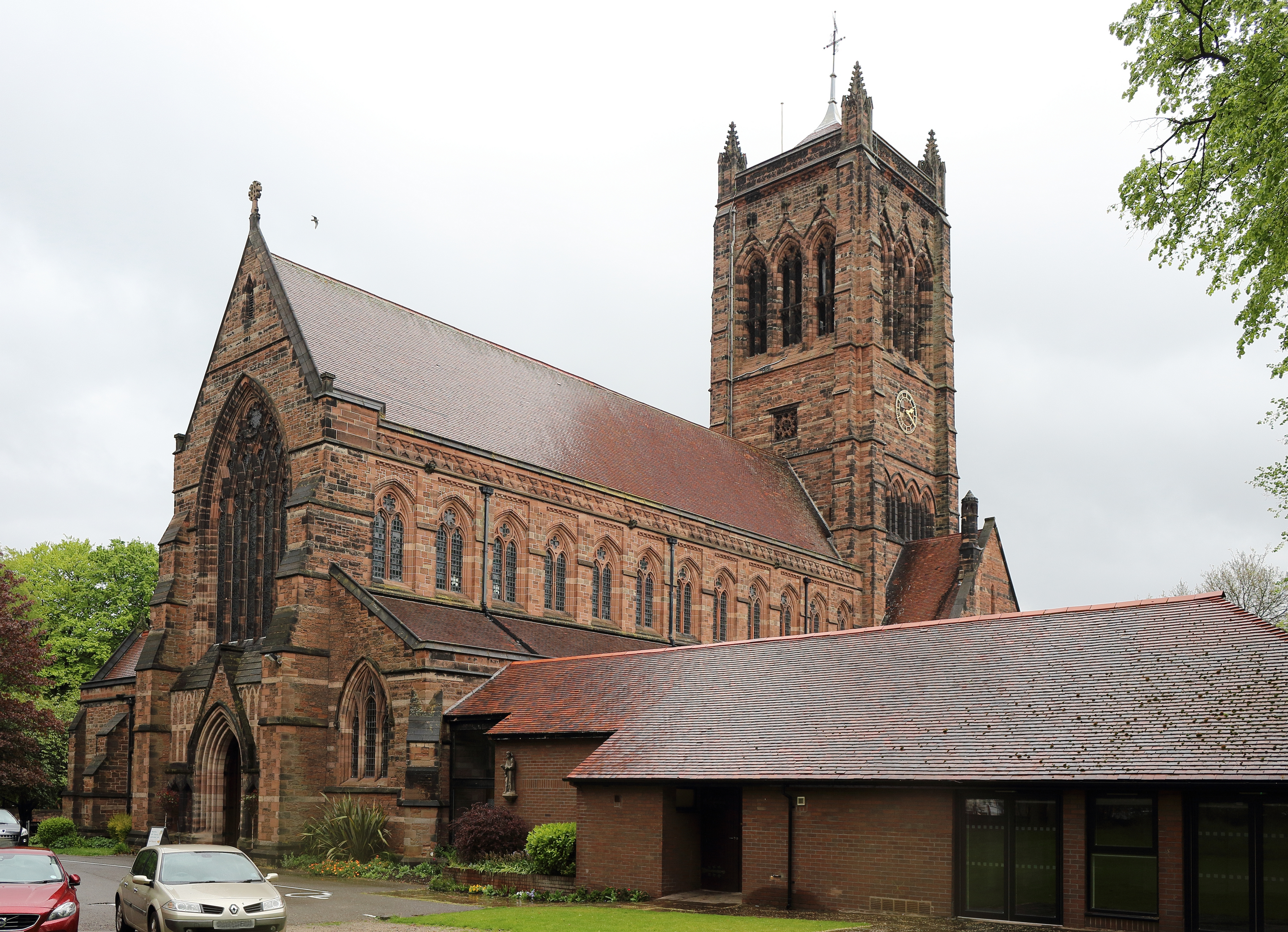
- Church of St Matthew and St James, Mossley Hill
- 53.3763°N 2.9206°W
- OS grid reference: SJ 388,870
- Location: Rose Lane, Mossley Hill, Liverpool
- Country: England
- Denomination: Anglican
- Website: Mossley Hill Church

History
- Status: Parish church
- Founder: Matthew James Glenton
- Dedication: St Matthew, St James
- Consecrated: 23 June 1875

Architecture
- Functional status: Active
- Heritage designation: Grade II*
- Designated: 14 March 1975
- Architect: Paley and Austin
- Architectural type: Church
- Style: Gothic Revival
- Groundbreaking: 1870
- Completed: 1880
- Construction cost: £28,000

Specifications
- Materials: Red sandstone, tile roof

Administration
- Province: York
- Diocese: Liverpool
- Archdeaconry: Liverpool
- Deanery: Liverpool South Childwall
- Parish: Mossley Hill

Clergy
- Rector: Revd Rachel Archer

The Church of St Matthew and St James stands on the top of a hill in Rose Lane, Mossley Hill, Liverpool, England. It is an active Anglican parish church in the deanery of Liverpool South Childwall, the archdeaconry of Liverpool and the diocese of Liverpool. The church is recorded in the National Heritage List for England as a designated Grade II* listed building. The authors of the Buildings of England series describe it as "one of the best Victorian churches in Liverpool".

== History ==
The church was built between 1870 and 1875, and designed by the Lancaster architects Paley and Austin in 1870, but not consecrated until 1875. The church and adjoining vicarage cost £28,000 (£2.79 million today) and were paid for by a local merchant Matthew James Glenton, whose Christian names were used for the church's dedications. The east window and baptistry, designed by the same architects, were added in 1880. In 1922 a new chapel, the Ritchie Chapel, was added to the northeast corner of the church.

In the Second World War this church was the first church in Britain to be damaged by enemy bombing, which took place on the night of 28–29 August 1940. All the stained glass windows were destroyed; these included windows designed by William Morris and Henry Holiday. The church was restored in 1950–1952 by Alfred Shennan. In 1975 a new church hall designed by Donald Buttress was added to the southwest corner of the church.

== Architecture ==
=== Exterior ===
The church is built in red sandstone rubble with ashlar dressings and a tile roof; it is in 13th century style. Its plan is cruciform, consisting of a six-bay nave with a clerestory, north and south aisles, north and south porches, transepts with a tower at the crossing, a chancel with a north organ loft and a south chapel, and an octagonal vestry. The tower has angle buttresses, a stair turret on the northeast, and four two-light windows on the north and south sides. There are clock faces on three sides, two-light bell openings, a parapet with pinnacles and a pyramidal roof with a finial. The tower is described as being "truly monumental". The exterior of the east and west fronts is decorated with flushwork arcading. Along the clerestory are twelve two-light windows.

=== Interior ===
The interior is described as bring "majestic, the centrepiece being the great crossing tower". The arcades are carried on alternating octagonal and clustered piers which lead to a ""magnificent" crossing. Most of the fittings and furnishings were designed by the architects. The pulpit is below the west arch of the crossing. The font is in alabaster. The glass which was destroyed in the Second World War has been replaced by clear glass on the sides of the church, and by stained glass in the east and west windows. This was designed by Carl Edwards and made by James Powell and Sons. The glass in the east window depicts the Apostles' Creed and that in the west window, Paradise Lost. In the passage leading to the church hall are two windows with stained glass made by Morris & Co. and moved from Cheadle Congregational Church when it was demolished in 1970. In the vestry porch is a memorial to the South African War in Art Nouveau style. The reredos has a canopy and a coloured carving of the Upper Room in Emmaus, which is a copy of a glass mosaic in Westminster Abbey.

The three-manual pipe organ was built in 1874 by Henry Willis, and rebuilt in 1937 by his successor in the practice. It was dismantled in 1940 after the church was bombed, and reinstated in 1953. Since then there have been further modifications by Henry Willis and Sons, and by S. Reeves.

== External features ==
The vicarage to the east of the church was also designed by Paley and Austin. It is a Grade II listed building.

== See also ==
- Grade II* listed buildings in Merseyside
- List of ecclesiastical works by Paley and Austin
