= List of parks and open spaces in Merseyside =

The following is a list of parks and open spaces in Merseyside, England. Covering the areas of Knowsley, Liverpool, Sefton and St Helens.

== Knowsley ==
List is referenced from Knowsley Metropolitan Borough Councils' website.

- Acornfield Plantation
- Bowring Park
- Court Hey Park
- Halewood Park
- Henley Park
- Huyton Lane Wetland
- Jubilee Park
- McGoldrick Park
- Millbrook Park Millennium Green
- Mill Farm park
- Sawpit Park
- Stadt Moers Park
- St Chads Gardens
- St Johns Millennium Green
- Valley Millennium Green
- Webster Park
- Whitestone Millennium Green
- Wignall Park

== Liverpool ==
List is referenced from Liverpool City Councils' website.

- Abercromby Square
- Allerton Towers Park
- Anfield Crematorium Gardens
- Belle Vale Park
- Calderstones Park
- Canalside Park
- Chavasse Park
- Church of St Luke
- Clarke's Gardens
- Croxteth Hall and Country Park
- Devonfield Garden
- Dovecot Park
- Everton Park
- Falkner Square
- Gambier Terrace
- Greenbank Park
- Newsham Park
- Otterspool Promenade and Park
- Princes Park
- Reynolds Park
- Sefton Park
- Speke and Garston Coastal Reserve
- Speke Hall
- Springwood Crematorium Gardens
- St. James Mount and Gardens
- St John's Gardens
- St. Nicholas Church Gardens
- Stanley Park
- Sudley Estate
- Walton Hall Park
- Warbreck Park
- Wavertree Botanic Park and Gardens
- Wavertree Playground ("The Mystery")
- Woolton Woods and Camphill

== St Helens ==
List is referenced from St Helens Councils' website.

- Mesnes Park
- Willow Park
- Taylor Park
- Thatto Heath Park
- Sherdley Park
- Sutton Park
- Sankey Valley Country Park
- Siding Lane Local Nature Reserve
- Clinkham Wood Community Woodland Local Nature Reserve
- Bankes Park
- Downall Croft
- The Duckeries
- Nanny Goat Park
- Gaskell Park
- Victoria Park
- Haresfinch Park
- Queens Park

== Sefton ==
List is referenced from Sefton Councils' website.

- Abbeyfield Park
- Adelaide Gardens
- Alexandra Park and War Memorial
- Amos Square
- Beach Lawns
- Bedford Park
- Botanic Gardens, Southport
- Bowersdale Park
- Canning Rd Rec. Ground
- Centenary Gardens
- Compton Road Park
- Copy Farm Wildlife and Play Area
- Coronation Park
- Crescent Gardens
- Crossens Community Park
- Deepdale Park
- Derby Park, Bootle
- Floral Hall Gardens
- Giro Park
- Hall Rd Park/Merrilocks Road
- Hapsford Road (Open Area)
- Hatton Hill Park
- Hesketh Park, Southport
- Hightown Children's Park
- Johnsons Bowling Green (Linacre Hub)
- Killen Green Park
- Kings Gardens
- Kings Gardens, Bootle
- Kings Gardens, Southport
- Kirkstone Park
- Liverpool Road Rec. Ground
- Lonsdale Park
- Maghull Old Hall Site
- Marian Park
- Marine Gardens, Crosby
- Melanear Park
- Moorside Park (All Areas)
- Moss Lane Bowling Green (Menai Road Park)
- North Park, Bootle
- Pinfold Cottage Woodland Park
- Poets Park
- Potters Barn
- Princes Park
- Rainbow Park
- Rimrose Valley Country Park
- Runnels Lane Park
- St Marys Gardens
- South Marine Park
- South Park Bootle
- Victoria Park, Crosby
- Victoria Park, Southport

== Wirral ==
List is referenced from Wirral Councils' website.

- Arrowe Country Park
- Ashton Park, West Kirby
- Bidston Hill
- Birkenhead Park
- Central Park Wallasey
- Coronation Gardens, West Kirby
- Dibbinsdale Local Nature Reserve
- Eastham Country Park
- Heswall Dales
- Hilbre Islands
- Royden Park
- Stapledon Woods and Caldy Hill
- Vale Park
- Victoria and Mersey Parks
- Wirral Country Park
- North Wirral Coastal Park
