= Parks and open spaces in Liverpool =

Liverpool in England has a significant number of public parks and gardens. The Register of Historic Parks and Gardens of Special Historic Interest in England describes the city's collection of Victorian parks as the "most important in the country". Liverpool has 10 listed parks and cemeteries, including two Grade I and five Grade II*, more than any other UK city except London. There are over 2,500 acres (10 km^{2}) of parks and open spaces in the city.

For many centuries, much of the open space was private estate land. In particular, several of the city's grand houses of the Georgian and Victorian eras are now either demolished or in public ownership, with their grounds and gardens given over to the city. However, several parks which were conceived from the outset as public parks are partly modelled on the nearby Birkenhead Park, which was amongst the first of its type in the world.

== Historical background ==
In 1833, the government's Select Committee on Public Walks emphasised the need to provide accessible space for recreation to improve the health of the urban population, defuse social tensions, and allow social classes to mix. From the early 1850s onwards, Liverpool endorsed this policy with the introduction of a ring of major municipal parks through a significant level of investment in public parks. These included parks such as Princes, Sefton, Wavertree, Shiel, Newsham, and Stanley.

== List ==
This list includes all the parks and open spaces included on the website of Liverpool City Council, all the registered parks and gardens in the National Heritage List for England, and a historic park that is now closed.

=== Key ===
Explanation of the registered parks and gardens grades
Grade	Criteria
I	Of exceptional interest
II*	Particularly important, of more than special interest
II	Of special interest, warranting every effort to preserve them

Parks, locations, photographs, size, notes and listing, if any
Name	Map ref and coordinates	Photograph	Size	Notes	Grading
Abercromby Square	SJ 359 899; 53.403°N 2.965°W			The square was built in about 1820 for Liverpool Corporation on heathland called Mosslake Fields. The design was by the Corporation surveyor, John Foster (senior). The buildings around the square are now occupied by the University of Liverpool.	—
Allerton Cemetery	SJ 417 852; 53.360°N 2.879°W		34 hectares (84 acres)	The cemetery opened in 1909 in part of the grounds of the Allerton Hall estate. It contains three sandstone chapels, all with steeples.	II
Allerton Towers	SJ 416 862; 53.370°N 2.877°W		14 hectares (35 acres)	The park originated as the grounds of Allerton Tower, a house designed by Harvey Lonsdale Elmes and completed in 1849. Liverpool Corporation bought the house and grounds in 1924, and the house was demolished. The park now hosts an outdoors activity centre.	—
Alt Meadows			8 hectares (20 acres)	The newest park in Liverpool, officially opened in March 2014.	—
Anfield Cemetery	SJ 365 939; 53.439°N 2.958°W		57 hectares (140 acres)	The cemetery was built in 1861–64 because those nearer the centre of the city were full. The layout was designed by Edward Kemp, and its buildings were mainly by the local cemetery architects Lucy and Littler. Two of the original three chapels have since been demolished.	II*
Belle Vale Park	SJ 431 885; 53.390°N 2.856°W			This is a small park in a densely populated part of the city. Close to it is the Lee Valley Millennium Centre.	—
Calderstones Park	SJ 405 875; 53.381°N 2.895°W		38 hectares (94 acres)	The park has been developed from the grounds of Calderstones House, built in about 1828. The grounds were converted into a park in 1913, and the house is used as council offices.	—
Camphill and Woolton Woods	SJ 422 863; 53.370°N 2.870°W		30 hectares (74 acres)	The park has been formed from the adjoining grounds of two houses, Camp Hill, which has been demolished, and Woolton Hall. It contains a walled garden and a floral cuckoo clock.	—
Canalside Park	SJ 343 923; 53.423°N 2.989°W			This is a small linear park lying between Vauxhall Road and the Leeds and Liverpool Canal.	—
Childwall Woods	SJ 413 887; 53.392°N 2.884°W		16 hectares (40 acres)	This formerly consisted of the grounds of Childwall House, which became a golf clubhouse in 1922. The house and grounds were acquired by the city council in 1939, and the house was demolished in 1949.	—
Clarke Gardens	SJ 415 857; 53.366°N 2.878°W			Named after the Clarke family who were the last owners of Allerton Hall and who gave the hall and grounds to the city council.	—
Croxteth Country Park Craven and Dam Woods	SJ 410 946; 53.444°N 2.890°W		203 hectares (500 acres) Craven and Dam Woods (75 acres).	This large country park surrounds Croxteth Hall, the former home of the Earls of Sefton. It contains a walled garden and a home farm, both of which are open to the public. Nearby Craven and Dam Woods, separated from Croxteth Park by Fir Tree Drive but linked via the back of the housing estate, comprise roughly 75 acres of woodland (additional to the 500 acres of Croxteth Country Park proper).	II
Devonfield Garden	SJ 358 965; 53.460°N 2.969°W			This is a small community park in a residential part of the city.	—
Doric Park	SJ 396 915; 53.418°N 2.911°W			There is a small community park in the Old Swan area.	—
Everton Park	SJ 357 920; 53.423°N 2.972°W			The park was created in the early 1980s on Everton Hill, the highest point in the city. It contains a walled garden and two small lakes.	—
Falkner Square	SJ 372 911; 53.398°N 2.963°W			This was one of the first public open spaces in Liverpool and was in existence by 1831. Building of the surrounding houses commenced in the 1840s.	—
Greenbank Park	SJ 384 882; 53.387°N 2.927°W			The park contains a lake as its centrepiece, which can be used for fishing. It also has a children's playground, a walled garden, and it hosts a graffiti art project.	—
Larkhill Park	SJ 383 933; 53.433°N 2.930°W			Much of this small park is occupied by a pond, which can be used for fishing.	—
Newsham Park	SJ 377 919; 53.420°N 2.939°W		48 hectares (120 acres)	The park has been developed from the grounds of Newsham House, and was laid out by Edward Kemp. It contains two lakes, a bandstand, and play areas.	II*
Norris Green Park					
Otterspool Park	SJ 379 863; 53.369°N 2.934°W			The park was developed from the grounds of the former Otterspool House. It has been a public park since 1932, and is adjacent to Otterspool Promenade.	—
Princes Park	SJ 366 881; 53.386°N 2.954°W		28 hectares (69 acres)	This was Liverpool's first public park, and was the first park designed by Joseph Paxton. It contains a fishing lake, and children's play areas.	II*
Ranelagh Gardens	SJ 352 902; 53.406°N 2.977°W			This was the first open space for public recreation in the city, opening in 1722. It closed in the late 1790s, and its site is now occupied by the Adelphi Hotel	—
Reynolds Park	SJ 421 875; 53.380°N 2.872°W		6 hectares (15 acres)	The park has been developed from the grounds of the former Reynolds Park Mansion that burnt down in 1921. It contains a walled garden, a wildflower meadow, a sunken garden, a topiary and a ha-ha.	—
Sefton Park	SJ 377 876; 53.383°N 2.939°W		82 hectares (200 acres)	This large park contains a Grade II* listed Palm House, the Shaftesbury memorial and Eros fountain, the Grade II listed Peter Pan statue, a grotto, a boating lake, a bandstand, and cafés.	I
Stanley Park	SJ 362 936; 53.435°N 2.963°W		46 hectares (110 acres)	Laid out between 1867 and 1871, the park was designed by Edward Kemp. It contains the Isla Gladstone Conservatory, lakes, a bandstand and play areas.	II*
St James Gardens	SJ 354 894; 53.397°N 2.972°W		4 hectares (9.9 acres)	Situated to the east of Liverpool Cathedral the gardens occupy a sunken site that was formerly a quarry, then a cemetery. Within the gardens is a memorial to William Huskisson.	I
St John's Gardens	SJ 348 906; 53.409°N 2.981°W			Adjacent to St George's Hall in the centre of the city, the site was formerly occupied by a church. Opened in 1904 it contains formal gardens, statues to prominent men of Liverpool, and a memorial to King's Regiment (Liverpool).	—
St Nicholas Church Gardens	SJ 339 904; 53.407°N 2.995°W			The former churchyard of St Nicolas' Church was laid out as a garden in 1891. It contains a memorial to those who died in the Liverpool Blitz.	—
Toxteth Park and Cemetery	SJ 375 889; 53.394°N 2.941°W		16 hectares (40 acres)	This was the first cemetery in the Liverpool area to be created under the Burial Act 1857. Two of its original three mortuary chapels remain.	II
Walton Hall Park	SJ 950 370; 53.449°N 2.955°W		52 hectares (130 acres)	The park was developed in the grounds of Walton Hall, which was demolished in about 1918. It contains a fishing lake, a pool for sailing model boats, and a play area.	—
Wavertree Botanic Garden and Park	SJ 375 903; 53.407°N 2.942°W		14.6 hectares (36 acres)	Botanic gardens founded by William Roscoe opened in 1836 and were acquired by the Corporation in 1846. Ten years later the land to the south of the botanic gardens was laid out as a park. The glasshouses were destroyed in the Second World War. The walled garden is still present.	II*

Entry to all of these parks is unrestricted in terms of opening hours, with the exception of the walled botanic garden in Wavertree Park; and free of charge in all cases.

== Croxteth Country Park ==
Today Croxteth Hall and Country Park is managed by Liverpool City Council. This park is an example of a working country estate, with the park featuring the historic hall itself, surrounded by mature woodlands, a collection of rare breed farm animals in the traditional "Home Farm" yard, and a Victorian walled garden. The hall is Grade II* listed and the park is Grade II.

== Academic studies ==
Academics from the University of Liverpool's School of History have undertaken research on the historic development of parks and open spaces in the city and their future contribution to community development, education, bio-diversity, public health and urban regeneration. The team have worked to compile the first definitive chronology of the city’s parks over the past 200 years and a book should document the changing role of parks, from their prominence during the Victorian era through to the present day.
