= Calderstones (disambiguation) =

Calderstones or Calderstone may refer to:

- Calderstones Park, a park in the Allerton suburb of Liverpool, England
  - The Calderstones, a collection of six neolithic sandstone monoliths in the park
  - Calderstones House, a mansion in the park
  - Calderstones School, a comprehensive school near the park
- Calderstone Productions, a record company that administers recordings by The Beatles
- Calderstones Partnership NHS Foundation Trust, a former hospital and health services provider in Whalley, Lancashire, England
- Calderstone Middle School, Brampton, Ontario, Canada, operated by the Peel District School Board
