= Grade II listed buildings in Liverpool-L25 =

Liverpool is a city and port in Merseyside, England, which contains many listed buildings. A listed building is a structure designated by English Heritage of being of architectural and/or of historical importance and, as such, is included in the National Heritage List for England. There are three grades of listing, according to the degree of importance of the structure. Grade I includes those buildings that are of "exceptional interest, sometimes considered to be internationally important"; the buildings in Grade II* are "particularly important buildings of more than special interest"; and those in Grade II are "nationally important and of special interest". Very few buildings are included in Grade I — only 2.5% of the total. Grade II* buildings represent 5.5% of the total, while the great majority, 92%, are included in Grade II.

Liverpool contains more than 1,550 listed buildings, of which 28 are in Grade I, 109 in Grade II*, and the rest in Grade II. (Note: These figures are taken from a search in the National Heritage List for England in May 2013, and are subject to variation as further buildings are listed, grades are revised, or buildings are delisted.) This list contains the Grade II listed buildings in the L25 postal district of Liverpool. The district includes the former villages of Woolton and Gateacre, which were later incorporated into the growing city of Liverpool. It also contains the newer districts of Belle Vale and Hunt's Cross. The listed buildings reflect this history. They include such village features as crosses and memorials. The houses vary from small old cottages and houses, to mansions built by wealthy businessmen during the 19th century.

Grade II listed buildings from other areas in the city can be found through the box on the right, along with the lists of the Grade I and Grade II* buildings in the city.

== Buildings ==
Name	Location	Photograph	Built	Notes
Acrefield Cottage	Acrefield Road; 53.37919°N 2.86676°W	—	Early 19th century	A stuccoed house with a slate roof. It is in two storeys, and has a three-bay front. At the top of the house is a cornice. On the ground floor are canted bay windows with hipped roofs that continue to form a canopy over the entrance. The windows are sashes.
Acrefield Kindergarten	Acrefield Road; 53.3782°N 2.8671°W	—	Before 1840	A stuccoed house with a slate roof. It is in two storeys, and has a three-bay front. The centre bay projects forward under a pediment and contains a porch with two Ionic columns. On the right side of the house is a two-storey bow window.
Former Aymestrey Court	Acrefield Road; 53.3805°N 2.8659°W	—	1881–82	A large red brick house with a red tiled roof built by Henry Tate as a gift for his daughter. It was later used as a residential school, then as a hotel, and subsequently converted back into a house. The house is in two storeys with an attic, and has a front of four bays. The windows are sashes, and some are mullioned and transomed. Other features include gables, some of which are half-timbered, and dormers.
Coach house, Aymestrey Court	Acrefield Road; 53.38063°N 2.86600°W	—	1887	The coach house has a billiard room above. It is in brick with tile-hanging, and has a tiled roof. The building is in two storeys, and has a front of three bays. In the ground floor are square windows. The upper floor is jettied, and has two-light windows with a half-dormer in a timber-framed gable between them.
Bankside	Acrefield Road; 53.3778°N 2.8671°W	—	Mid 19th century	A stuccoed house with a slate roof. It is in two storeys, and has fronts of two and three bays. Its features include canted bay windows, gables with decorative bargeboards, sash windows, and a porch with an embattled parapet.
Blair Lea Lodge	Acrefield Road; 53.37726°N 2.86668°W	—	c. 1870	The lodge is in brick with a slate roof. It is in a single storey and has fronts of two bays. On the front facing the street is a porch with a turret; the turret has brick diapering, a cornice with a gargoyle, and a spire. On the right side of the lodge is a rectangular bay window with a gable and hipped roof.
Hillcliffe	Acrefield Road; 53.3785°N 2.8671°W	—	Early 19th century	A stuccoed house with a slate roof. It is in two storeys, and has a five-bay front. Other features include an iron verandah, gables, sash windows, and a canted porch.
Lodge and stable block	Acrefield Road; 53.38053°N 2.86619°W	—	1884	The lodge and stable block to Aymestrey Court are in brick with a tiled roof. The building has an L-plan. The lodge to the right is in two bays and has a two-storey bay window with a gable. The gable is in timber and has pargetted panels painted with roses and sunflowers. The stable block has a louvre surmounted by a spirelet.
The Mount	Acrefield Road; 53.37796°N 2.86832°W	—	Mid 19th century	A stuccoed house with a slate roof. It is in two storeys, and has a three-bay front, with an additional wing on the left side. The windows in the ground floor are casements; in the upper floor they are sashes. The entrance is in the left wing.
—	8 and 10 Acrefield Road; 53.37620°N 2.86729°W	—	Early 19th century	A pair of brick houses with stone dressings and a slate roof. The building has two storeys and a three-bay front. At the centre are paired round-headed entrances, above which is a blind window. The windows have wedge lintels; in No. 8 they are sashes, and in No. 10 they are casements.
—	12 and 14 Acrefield Road; 53.37630°N 2.86728°W	—	Early 19th century	A pair of brick houses with stone dressings and a slate roof. The building has two storeys and a three-bay front. At the top of the house is a cornice. The windows are sashes under wedge lintels. At the centre are paired round-headed entrances.
—	16 Acrefield Road; 53.37637°N 2.86726°W	—	Early 19th century	A brick house with stone dressings and a slate roof. It has two storeys and a two-bay front. Above the windows, the entrance, and an entry are wedge lintels. The windows are casements.
—	18 and 20 Acrefield Road; 53.37647°N 2.86731°W	—	Early 19th century	A pair of brick houses with stone dressings and a hipped slate roof. The building has two storeys and a basement. Each house has a single-bay front. At the top of the house is a cornice. The windows have wedge lintels; those in No, 18 are casements and in No, 20 they are sashes. The round-headed entrances are on the sides.
Allerton Golf Club House	Allerton Road; 53.37259°N 2.88734°W		1815	Part of a stone house named Allerton, which was designed by Thomas Harrison. It was severely damaged by fire in 1944, and is mainly a ruin. The surviving part is in Neoclassical style, is in a single storey, and has sides of seven bays. On one front is a colonnade of eight Doric columns, and on another front is bow window with attached Doric columns.
Obelisk near Allerton Golf Club House	Allerton Road; 53.37195°N 2.88664°W		18th century	The obelisk is in red sandstone ashlar. It has a square plan, and stands on a plinth with a moulded base. At the top is a cornice with balls on the angles.
Lodge, Allerton Priory	Allerton Road; 53.36835°N 2.88785°W		1867–70	The lodge was designed by Alfred Waterhouse, who also designed the house. It is in brick with decorative bands, and has a slate roof. The lodge has two storeys and a two-bay front. There is a large porch facing the drive, carried on timber posts with a timber-framed upper storey. On the sides of the lodge are paired windows under slate canopies.
Woolton Library	Allerton Road; 53.37367°N 2.87065°W		1834	The library originated as a Methodist chapel. It is built in stone with a slate roof, and has two bays on the front and on the sides. The library is in a single storey with a basement. At the top is a cornice and a pediment. The windows are sashes, and the entrance is on the right side.
—	25 Allerton Road; 53.37464°N 2.86748°W		Early 19th century	A brick house with stone dressings and a slate roof. It is in two storeys, and has a two-front. The windows are sashes under wedge lintels. In the ground floor is a canted bay window.
Lake House	27 Allerton Road; 53.37459°N 2.86758°W		Early 19th century	A brick house with stone dressings and a slate roof. It is in two storeys, and has a two-bay front. At the top of the house is a cornice. The windows are sashes under wedge lintels. In the centre is a round-headed entrance with a fanlight and a panelled doorcase.
—	30 Allerton Road; 53.37468°N 2.86811°W		Early 19th century	A brick shop with stone dressings and a slate roof. It is in two storeys, and has a two-bay front on Allerton Road, one bay on Church Street, and a canted bay between. On both fronts are 19th-century shop fronts; these and the entrance between them have cornices on brackets with finials. The other windows are sashes under wedge lintels. Above the entrance are a stone shield and panel.
—	61 and 61A Allerton Road; 53.37396°N 2.86975°W	—	Mid 19th century (probable)	Two stone houses with a hipped slate roof in two storeys. On the Allerton Road front are four bays, the first bay being canted forwards, and on the Quarry Street South side are three bays. At the top of the building is a frieze and a cornice. The windows are a mix of sashes and casements. The entrances are round-headed with imposts and keystones.
—	82–86 Allerton Road; 53.37381°N 2.87042°W	—	Before 1840	Three brick houses in two storeys, with stone dressings and a slate roof. Nos. 82 and 86 have two-bay fronts, and No. 84 has a single bay. The windows have wedge lintels; those of Nos. 82 and 84 are sashes, and No. 86 has casements. The entrances are round-headed, and to the right of the entrance to No. 82 is a loading bay.
—	104 and 106 Allerton Road; 53.37324°N 2.87137°W	—	Early 19th century	A pair of brick houses with stone dressings and a slate roof. They are in two storeys, and have a four-bay front, the first bay being lower and recessed. At the top of the building is a cornice. The windows are sashes. In the third bay are a pair of round-headed entrances.
—	116 and 118 Allerton Road; 53.37265°N 2.87226°W		1845	A pair of houses used at one time as a nurses' home. They are in stone with a slate roof, they are in two storeys, and have a four-bay front. The outer bays project forward under gables with finials. The windows are sashes. In the fourth bay is a canted bay window. In the centre is an inscribed plaque.
—	120 Allerton Road; 53.37255°N 2.87245°W	—	Early 19th century	A stuccoed house with a hipped slate roof. It is in two storeys, and has a three-bay front. The entrance is in the centre and has a gabled porch with decorative bargeboards. Flanking this are canted bay windows. The windows are casements.
—	1–6 Ashton Square; 53.37077°N 2.86405°W	—	Late 18th century	A terrace of seven brick houses with a slate roof. They are in two storeys, and each house has a one-bay front. The windows have pointed heads containing Y-tracery and small-pane casement windows. The entrances also have pointed heads.
—	7 Ashton Square; 53.37104°N 2.86405°W	—	18th century	A stone house with a slate roof. It has two storeys and a two-bay front. The mullioned windows have two lights. The entrance is central, and has a consoled segmental head.
Abbots Lea	Beaconsfield Road; 53.38193°N 2.88239°W	—	1862	A red sandstone house with a slate roof designed by William Culshaw in Gothic style. It has two storeys and an attic, and a front of seven bays. The first bay projects forward and is gabled, and the sixth bay contains a two-storey rectangular bay window. At the top of the house is a corbelled cornice. The windows are mullioned and transomed.
Beacon Hill	Beaconsfield Road; 53.38103°N 2.88163°W	—	c. 1868	A stuccoed house with a slate roof in Italianate style. It is in two storeys, and has three bays on each front. Above the end bay on the front is an open pediment. In the ground floor are two bay windows, one canted, one rectangular, flanking a porch. There is another rectangular bay window and an open pediment on the left side of the house.
Knolle Park	Beaconsfield Road; 53.3818°N 2.8753°W		c. 1840	Originally a house, this was later used as St Gabriel's Convent and a children's care home. It is built in stone with a slate roof. The house is in two storeys, and has a front of six large bays with giant pilasters. At the top is a cornice. The Corinthian-style porch has four columns. The windows are sashes, some with architraves.
Entrance to Knolle Park	Beaconsfield Road; 53.38257°N 2.87502°W		c. 1840s	The entrance consists of four gate piers, gates and flanking railings. The stone piers are octagonal and panelled, with caps. The two central piers originally had lanterns.
Lodge to Knolle Park	Beaconsfield Road; 53.38254°N 2.87521°W		c. 1840	A stone lodge with a slate roof in a single storey. At its end is an entrance with a two-column Greek Doric portico, and along the sides are entablatures.
The Cottage and Beaconsfield	35 and 37 Beaconsfield Road; 53.38119°N 2.88022°W		Before 1848	A pair of stone houses with a slate roof. They are in two storeys with attics, and have three bays on the front and on the sides. In the first bay is a canted bay window. The windows are mullioned. One entrance is on the front, the other on the right side. The gables are coped with finials.
Stoneleigh	46 and 48 Beaconsfield Road; 53.38114°N 2.87890°W		c. 1858–59	Two houses, each in two storeys. Stoneleigh is built in red sandstone in Neoclassical style. It has a symmetrical entrance front and has a central Doric porch with a balustrade. The ground floor windows are casements; those above are sashes. The other house is in Victorian style with a two-storey canted bay window. Inside is a billiard room with an inglenook.
Beaconsfield House	84 Beaconsfield Road; 53.38189°N 2.87777°W		c. 1833	The original Beaconsfield House has been demolished; this is a house created from the coachman's house and stables. It is in stone with a slate roof, and has two storeys and a three-bay front with two gables. In the central bay is an entrance with an ogival head. There are three gabled bays along the left side. The windows are mullioned.
1–4 Church Cottages	Belle Vale Road; 53.3872°N 2.8562°W	Church Cottages	1872	Four houses in brick with stone dressings and slate roofs. They are in two storeys, and have a four-bay front. The outer bays have jettied timber gables; between them are two half-dormers. In the ground floor the windows are mullioned and contain sashes; the upper floor windows are casements. In the centre is a pair of entrances under a canopy. On the sides of the house are timber porches.
5–8 Church Cottages	Belle Vale Road; 53.3872°N 2.8559°W	—	1872	Four houses in brick with stone dressings and slate roofs. They are in two storeys, and have a four-bay front. The outer bays have jettied timber gables; between them are two half-dormers. In the ground floor the windows are mullioned and contain sashes; the upper floor windows are casements. In the centre is a pair of entrances under a canopy. On the sides of the house are timber porches.
9–12 Church Cottages	Belle Vale Road; 53.3873°N 2.8555°W	—	1872	Four houses in brick with stone dressings and slate roofs. They are in two storeys, and have a four-bay front. The outer bays have jettied timber gables; between them are two half-dormers. In the ground floor the windows are mullioned and contain sashes; the upper floor windows are casements. In the centre is a pair of entrances under a canopy. On the sides of the house are timber porches.
St Stephen's Church	Belle Vale Road; 53.3868°N 2.8559°W		1872–74	The church was designed by Cornelius Sherlock in the style of about 1300. It is built in stone, and has a slate roof with a tiled ridge. The church consists of a nave with aisles and a southwest porch, a chancel with vestries, and a northwest steeple. The west window, dating from 1883, was made by Morris & Co.
Signpost opposite No.66	Belle Vale Road; 53.38566°N 2.85690°W		1897	This consists of an octagonal timber post with brackets supporting boards showing the distances to Garston, Hale and Liverpool in one direction, and to Huyton, Prescot and Warrington in the other. At the top is a weather vane.
—	1 and 2 Belle Vale Road; 53.38315°N 2.86138°W	Belle Vale Road	Early 19th century	A pair of stone houses with a slate roof. They are in two storeys, and have a three-bay front. At the top of the building is a frieze and a cornice. The central window in the upper floor is divided by a mullion, with a sash window to the left and a casement to the right. The ground floor window in No 2 is a casement; the others are sashes. In the centre are two round-headed entrances. The ground floor window in No 1 projects under a swept cornice. The front garden wall is included in the listing.
—	3 and 4 Belle Vale Road; 53.38319°N 2.86123°W	—	Early 19th century	A pair of stone houses with a slate roof. They are in two storeys, and have a two-bay front. At the top of the building is a cornice. The windows are sashes. The front garden wall is included in the listing.
—	5, 6 and 7 Belle Vale Road; 53.38323°N 2.86105°W	—	Early 19th century	A row of three stone houses with a slate roof. They are in two storeys. No. 5 has a two-bay front; the others each have a single bay. The windows are sashes. At the top of the building is a cornice. The front garden wall is included in the listing.
—	8 and 9 Belle Vale Road; 53.38327°N 2.86088°W	—	Early 19th century	Two stone houses with a slate roof. They are in two storeys, and each house has a one-bay front. At the top of the building is a cornice. The windows are sashes. The front stone garden wall is included in the listing.
Archbishop's House	Church Road, Woolton; 53.3771°N 2.8694°W		1830s	A stone house, originally called Beechwood, which was built for his own use by James Rose, a corn miller. It is in stone, has two storeys and a front of six bays, the right three bays being symmetrical. In the centre of these bays is a Greek Doric porch. The other bays were added later, as were further extensions. including a billiard room.
Boundary stone	Church Road, Woolton; 53.38029°N 2.87328°W		Uncertain	The boundary stone stands at the junction of Church Road and Reservoir Road. It is divided into two parts by a vertical line, each side having a rounded top. The left part is inscribed with MUCH WOOLTON and the right part with LITTLE WOOLTON.
Churchfield	Church Road, Woolton; 53.3776°N 2.8698°W		c. 1830	Originally a parsonage, this house is in brick with a slate roof. It is in two storeys, and has a three-bay front with a later bay added to the left side. At the top of the house is a frieze and a cornice. The windows are sashes. In the centre is a porch with a prayer inscribed on its left side.
Lychgate, St. Peter's Church	Church Road, Woolton; 53.37596°N 2.86887°W		c. 1886–87	The lychgate was designed by Grayson and Ould, who also designed the church. It consists of a large, ornate, timber canopy on a stone base. It has a shingled roof with finely carved bressumers and bargeboards.
Outbuilding, Reynolds Park	Church Road, Woolton; 53.37860°N 2.87143°W	—	Early 19th century	A stone building with a slate roof and stone ridges. At the east end are two entrances with pointed arches, and inside are two enclosures. On the top of the building is an octagonal louvred structure with a spire and a weathervane.
Peace Cross, St. Peter's Church	Church Road, Woolton; 53.37610°N 2.86901°W		1919	The cross celebrates the Armistice of 11 November 1918 following the First World War. It stands in an enclosure by the side of the road to the east of the church. The cross is in red sandstone, and consists of a Celtic cross on a rectangular plinth, with carved decoration in Art Nouveau style on the front and back. The decoration starts with foliage, rises to form a crown of thorns, and has flower buds at the top. On the lower part of the front and back is carved "PEACE", and on each face is the date of the Armistice.
Reynolds Lodge	Church Road, Woolton; 53.38025°N 2.87292°W		1888	This was built as a lodge to Reynolds Park in Domestic Revival style. The lodge is constructed in brick with a tiled roof. It has a T-shaped plan, and is one storey with an attic. Its features include a four-light rectangular bay window, gables that are tile-hung, or half-timbered with pargeting, lancet windows, and a central clustered chimneystack.
Riffle Lodge	Church Road, Woolton; 53.37838°N 2.87121°W		1859	A house in cottage orné style, it is in two storeys, with a stone lower floor and a half-timbered upper floor. It has a two-bay front with a central doorway. The bay to the left projects forward, and to the right is a canted bay window. Above are oriel windows, and gables with pierced ornamental bargeboards.
Rosemont	Church Road, Woolton; 53.37638°N 2.86968°W		Early 19th century	A stone house with a hipped slate roof, in the centre of which is a lantern. It is in two storeys, and has a three-bay front. The ground floor is rusticated, and at the top of the house is a frieze decorated with wreaths, and a cornice. On the front of the house is a Doric colonnade, and at the ends are flat pilasters. The right hand bay contains a two-storey canted bay window.
St Mary's Church	Church Road, Woolton; 53.3751°N 2.8704°W		1859–60	A Roman Catholic church designed by R. W. Hughes. It is built in red sandstone with a slate roof. The church consists of a nave, a chancel, large transepts, a single-storey sacristy on each side, and a north porch. There is a rose window in the north transept and in one of the sacristies.
Presbytery, St Mary's Church	Church Road, Woolton; 53.37537°N 2.87000°W		1864	The presbytery was designed by E. W. Pugin. It is in stone, and has a slate roof. The presbytery has two storeys, and a front of three bays, the outer bays projecting under gables. In the centre bay is a gablet, and the third bay contains a single-storey canted bay window. The presbytery is connected on the left by a single-storey corridor with a central gabled entrance and a ridge dormer.
St Peter's Parish Rooms	Church Road, Woolton; 53.3757°N 2.8685°W		1823	Originally a school, this is a brick building with stone dressings, a slate roof and red tile cresting. It is in a single storey, and has a five-bay front. The windows are sashes under wedge lintels. In the centre is a gable with a round-headed arch containing a sandstone plaque with the date. On the gable is an iron finial.
Yewfield	Church Road, Woolton; 53.3762°N 2.8686°W		1820s	A stuccoed house with a slate roof. It is in two storeys, and there are three bays on the front and the sides. At the top of the house is a frieze and a cornice. Over the central bay is a gable containing two casement windows; the other windows are sashes. Along the front is a ground floor verandah. There is a 20th-century extension on the left side.
—	2, 4, 6, 8, and 8A Church Road, Woolton; 53.3751°N 2.8680°W		Early 19th century	A terrace of five stone houses with a slate roof. They are in two storeys with a basement, and each house has a one-bay front. The windows are sashes, and the entrances are round-headed.
—	7–19 Church Road, Woolton; 53.3749°N 2.8682°W		Mid 19th century	A terrace of seven brick houses with stone dressings and a slate roof. They are in two storeys with a basement, and they have fronts of one or two bays. At the top of the building is a frieze and a cornice. The windows have wedge lintels, and most are sashes. The entrances are round-headed and all but No. 7 have a fanlight.
—	10 and 12 Church Road, Woolton; 53.3752°N 2.8681°W		Early 19th century	Two stone houses with a slate roof. They have two storeys and basements, and each house has a two-bay front. At the top of the house is a frieze and a cornice. Both houses have round-headed entrances. The left house has sash windows and one blind window. The right house has casement windows.
—	14–22 Church Road, Woolton; 53.37544°N 2.86813°W		Early 19th century	A terrace of five stone houses with a slate roof. They have two storeys, and each house has a one-bay front. At the top of the house is a cornice. The windows are sashes. The entrances are round-headed with pilasters, archivolts, and fanlights, and have blind windows above. No. 22 has a canted bay window.
—	21 and 23 Church Road, Woolton; 53.37502°N 2.86836°W		Mid 19th century	Two brick houses with stone dressings and a slate roof in two storeys. No. 21 has a one-bay front, and No. 23 has two bays. The windows have wedge lintels. No 21. has a timber latticed porch, an entry to the left, and casement windows.
—	24 Church Road, Woolton; 53.37558°N 2.86817°W		Early 19th century	A stone house with a slate roof. It is in two storeys, and has a two-bay front. The windows are small-paned casements, and the entrance dates from the 20th century.
—	26 Church Road, Woolton; 53.37560°N 2.86818°W		Early 19th century	A stone house with a slate roof. It is in two storeys, and has a single-bay front. The windows are small-paned casements, and the entrance dates from the 20th century.
—	25 and 27 Church Road, Woolton; 53.37513°N 2.86844°W		Early 19th century	Two brick houses with stone dressings and a slate roof. They are in two storeys with basements, and each has a two-bay front. The windows are sashes under wedge lintels. Each house has a timber latticed porch. No. 25 has an entry to the right.
Knolle Park Mews	123 Church Road, Woolton; 53.38103°N 2.87392°W		1828	This was built as the stables to Knolle Park, and was altered in 1968. It is in sandstone with a slate roof. The building has two storeys, and a front of seven bays, the central and lateral bays projecting forward. In the centre is a large archway with voussoirs and panelled pilasters. There is a south wing with a central pediment, and a modern north wing.
The Cottage	Clarke's Gardens; 53.36257°N 2.87987°W		1639	A stone house with a slate roof, and some brick where the roof has been heightened. It is in two storeys with a basement, it has a two-bay front, and a short south wing. The windows are casements with stone lintels. The porch has a semicircular head, and a rear entrance is approached by a flight of wooden steps.
Oakfield Terrace	1, 2 and 3 Cuckoo Lane; 53.3851°N 2.8689°W	—	Early 19th century	A terrace of three stuccoed houses. It is in two storeys, with a front of seven bays facing away from the street. The centre house has three bays, the others have two. The central three bays and the end bays project forward under gables. In the end bays are rectangular bay windows. Flanking the central entrance are canted bay windows. The windows in the lower floor are casements; in the upper floor they are sashes. The entrances to the lateral houses are on the sides.
Black Bull Public House	Gateacre Brow; 53.3834°N 2.8629°W		Late 19th century	The public house is timber-framed and has a slate roof with a tiled cresting. It is in two storeys with attics, and has two gabled and canted bay windows at the front. In the first floor is a smaller canted bay window. All the windows contain small-pane casements. In the centre is a round-headed entrance with a fanlight, and a gable with a finial.
Drinking fountain	Gateacre Brow; 53.38334°N 2.86205°W		1883	The drinking fountain stands under a canopy in the form of a market cross. It is hexagonal, is in stone, and has a pyramidal stone-slate roof. The canopy is decorated with carving, including beasts, mermaids, the arms of Liverpool, and an inscription. At the top is a cornice and a gargoyle, and on the apex of the roof is a finial.
Clegg's Factory Building	Gateacre Brow; 53.38317°N 2.86221°W		c. 1867	This originated as a brewery. It is built in common brick, with decoration in coloured brick, and has a slate roof. The building is in three storeys, and has a five-bay front. In the ground and second floors are five segmental-headed windows, and across the top floor are seven windows; all are casements. On the roof is a louvre with a hipped roof, decorative iron cresting, and a weather cock.
Jubilee Memorial	Gateacre Brow; 53.38350°N 2.86242°W		1883	The memorial is in red granite standing on a plinth and two steps. There are attached angle columns with bronze bases and capitals. On the top is a cornice with a bronze bust of Queen Victoria by Count Victor G. Gleichen.
Unitarian chapel	Gateacre Brow; 53.38289°N 2.86325°W	—	1700	The chapel was extended in 1712, a vestry was added in 1872, and the roof was renewed in 1885. It is in stone with a slate roof, and has a front of two bays. At the top is a cornice, and on the right side is a Venetian window. At the west end is an octagonal cupola, and on the gables are ball finials. Inside the chapel are a west gallery and a timber pulpit.
—	2 Gateacre Brow; 53.38251°N 2.86525°W	—	Early 19th century	A brick house on a stone base with stone dressings and a hipped slate roof. It is in two storeys, and has a three-bay front. At the top of the house is a cornice. The windows are sashes under wedge lintels. In the third bay is a canted bay window, and the central entrance is round-headed with pilasters and a fanlight.
—	4 Gateacre Brow; 53.38255°N 2.86507°W	—	c. 1814	A stone house with a slate roof. It is in two storeys, and has a three-bay front. At the top of the house is a cornice. The windows are sashes under wedge lintels. The central entrance is round-headed with an architrave, imposts, a reeded frieze, and a fanlight.
—	6 Gateacre Brow; 53.38251°N 2.86525°W	—	c. 1805–10	A stone house with a slate roof, it is in two storeys and has a two-bay front. In the second bay is a canted bay window with casements. The other windows are sashes, the ground floor window in the first bay having three lights with mullions. The central round-headed doorway has an architrave, imposts, and a reeded frieze.
—	8 Gateacre Brow; 53.38265°N 2.86475°W	—	1807	A stone house with a slate roof, it is in two storeys and has a two-bay front. In the first bay is a 19th-century two-storey timber canted bay window. The windows in the second bay are sashes. On the ridge is a later dormer. On the left side of the house is a window with a rusticated wedge lintel with keystone and a date.
—	10 and 12 Gateacre Brow; 53.38271°N 2.86462°W	—	Early 19th century	A stuccoed house with a hipped slate roof. It is in two storeys, and has a two-bay front. The ground floor contains a 19th-century shop front and a central entrance; in the upper floor and along the left side are sash windows.
—	28A, 28B, 28C, and 28D Gateacre Brow; 53.38307°N 2.86303°W	—	1890s	A shop and office with flats above designed by W. Aubrey Thomas. It is in two storeys with an attic. The building stands on a corner with a canted corner bay and two bays on each street. The ground floor is in stone with timber framing above. Features include a jettied upper floor with pargetted panels containing biblical scenes, oriel windows, and a corner turret with an octagonal drum and an ogival cupola.
—	34 Gateacre Brow; 53.38307°N 2.86283°W	—	Early 19th century	The ground floor of the house was rebuilt in the 20th century. The house is in brick with stone dressings and has a slate roof. It has two storeys and a two-bay front. The windows bay are sashes. The entrance is through an entry on the right.
—	38 and 40 Gateacre Brow; 53.38311°N 2.86260°W	—	Early 19th century	A pair of brick cottages with stone dressings and a slate roof. They are in two storeys, and each cottage has one bay. At the top of the building is a frieze with corbels. The windows are sashes under wedge lintels, and the entrances are round-headed.
—	42 Gateacre Brow; 53.38313°N 2.86247°W	—	Early 19th century	A brick house with stone dressings and a slate roof. It is in two storeys, and has a four-bay front and one bay facing the road. Over the right three bays is a gable. The windows are sashes under wedge lintels. In the third bay is a round-headed entrance with panelled pilasters, an archivolt, and a fanlight. The window above the entrance has an architrave, a frieze, and a cornice.
Strawberry House, Mossdene and Crawfordsburn	Glenrose Road; 53.3812°N 2.8670°W	—	Mid 19th century	Originally one house, it has been subdivided into three dwellings. The building is stuccoed, and has a hipped slate roof. It is in two storeys, and has a seven-bay front, the second and sixth bays projecting under pediments. There are rectangular bay windows in the fourth and fifth bays. Further bay windows have been added to the fifth and sixth bays. There is a cornice between the floors, and another at the top of the building.
The Crying Tree	Grange Lane; 53.3899°N 2.8717°W		c. 1840s	Originating as a house, this was later converted into a restaurant. It is stuccoed, with a hipped slate roof. It is in two storeys, with an entrance front of three bays, the central bay being recessed. In the centre is a Tuscan porch with paired columns. The right side is in four bays, the second bay projecting under a pediment. The windows are sashes.
Grange Hollies	Grange Lane; 53.3890°N 2.8704°W		Mid 19th century	A stuccoed house on a rusticated base, with a hipped slate roof. It is in two storeys, and has a three-bay front. At the top of the building is a frieze and a cornice. The porch is in the centre and contains an entrance with angle pilasters, and an archivolt with a keystone. Other features include first-floor pierced balconies. The house has been converted into apartments for the elderly.
Grange Lodge	Grange Lane; 53.38511°N 2.86475°W	—	c. 1653	The stone house has a slate roof; it is in two storeys, and has a front of five bays, with two bays on the left side facing the street. The oldest part is the left bay, the next two bays date from about 1720, and the other two bays from the 1820s. In the left bay are mullioned windows; the other windows are sashes. The entrance is in the first bay; it is round-headed with angle pilasters, an archivolt with a keystone, and a fanlight. Inside is a panelled room dating from the 18th century.
Grange Mews, Riding School House, and The Cottage	Grange Lane; 53.3842°N 2.8634°W	—	1895	This originated as stables for the polo ponies of William Hall Walker, and for their staff. They were converted into houses in 1982. The buildings are in one storey with attics. The lower parts are in brick, the upper part are half-timbered with slate roofs and tiled ridges. Grange Mews is developed from the stables, and is in ten bays with casement windows. The cottage, at the left, is in four bays with mullioned windows and gables. The Riding School is in a single bay.
2 and 3 Paradise Row	Grange Lane; 53.38456°N 2.86416°W	Paradise Row	Early 18th century (probable)	Two stone houses with a slate roof. They are in two and three storeys, and have a three-bay front. The windows are horizontal-sliding sashes. Above the entrances are lintels with keystones.
4 and 5 Paradise Row	Grange Lane; 53.38456°N 2.86418°W	—	Early 18th century (probable)	Two stone houses with a stone slate roof. They are in two storeys, and each house has a single-bay front. The windows are horizontal-sliding sashes. Above the windows and entrances are wedge lintels.
1–4 Soarer Cottages	Grange Lane; 53.38465°N 2.86437°W	—	1896	A group of red brick cottages with stone dressings designed by R. T. Beckett for William Hall Walker. They are in two storeys, and each cottage has a front of four bays. The cottages have stone-coped gables, and the windows have chamfered mullions. Above the entrances are shaped lintels.
1–7 York Cottages	Grange Lane; 53.38375°N 2.86324°W	York Cottages	c. 1840	A terrace of seven brick houses with a hipped slate roof. They are in two storeys, and each house has one bay. The windows have segmental heads; apart from one sliding-sash window, the other windows are casements. The entrances are round-headed with blind fanlights.
8–14 York Cottages	Grange Lane; 53.38368°N 2.86342°W	—	c. 1840	A terrace of seven brick houses with a hipped slate roof. They are in two storeys, and each house has one bay. The windows have segmental heads and are casements. The entrances are round-headed with blind fanlights.
Gateway, Gateacre Hall Hotel	Halewood Road; 53.38071°N 2.85879°W	—	Early 18th century (probable)	A free-standing, disused gateway consisting of a pair of rusticated square gate piers supporting a pediment with a corniced keystone. Between them is an iron gate.
Kingsley	Halewood Road; 53.38257°N 2.86067°W	—	Early to mid 19th century	A brick house with stone dressings and a slate roof. It is in two storeys, and has a three-bay front. The windows are sashes under wedge lintels. The entrance is round-headed in an aedicule with fluted pilasters, an open pediment, and a fanlight.
—	5-9 Halewood Road; 53.38292°N 2.86124°W	—	Mid 19th century	Three brick houses with stone dressings and a slate roof. It is in two storeys, and each house has one bay. The windows are sashes; the windows and the entrances have wedge lintels.
—	78 and 80 Halewood Road; 53.37961°N 2.85753°W	—	Before 1840	Two stone houses with a slate roof in two storeys. No. 78 has a two-bay front, and No. 80 has a single bay. The windows in No. 78 are small-pane casements, and those in No. 80 are sashes. No. 78 has a round-headed entrance with an architrave, imposts, and a frieze. The entrance to No. 80 is on the side.
Camp Hill Lodge	Hillfoot Road; 53.36468°N 2.87089°W		1868	A brick lodge with stone dressings and a slate roof. It has an L-shaped plan, and is in one storey with an attic. In the angle is a porch with Jacobean decoration and pilasters. On the right is a canted bay with a shaped gable and mullioned windows.
—	1 Mason Street; 53.37554°N 2.86728°W		Late 18th century	A brick house with stone dressings and a slate roof. It is in three storeys, and has a gabled three-bay front. The windows are sashes under wedge lintels. The entrance is round-headed with a fanlight. On the left is a simpler wing.
Fletcher's Farmhouse	Menlove Avenue; 53.37451°N 2.88040°W	—	1740	The stone farmhouse has a slate roof, it is in two storeys and has a front of two bays. The windows are casements, and the gabled porch has a stone slate roof.
Mendips	251 Menlove Avenue; 53.377243°N 2.8813715°W		1933	Classic middle-class, two storey, semi-detached house of the 1930s, famous for being the childhood home of John Lennon. Exterior is of pebbledash render topped by a red tiled, hipped roof.
Roman Catholic School	Mount Street; 53.3747°N 2.8703°W		1869	The school is built in sandstone with a slate roof. It is in two storeys and has a nine-bay front, the central bay projecting forward under a gable. The windows in the ground floor have three lights under ogee heads; those in the upper floor have two lights under cusped heads. In the gable of the projecting wing is a rose window.
Newstead Farmhouse	Quarry Street; 53.3793°N 2.8787°W		Early 19th century	The former farmhouse and outbuildings are in stone, and surround three sides of a yard. Facing the road is a farm building in two storeys and five bays, the outer bays projecting forward under gables. This front contains a cart entrance and blind windows. The range on the left is the farmhouse, in two storeys and with a five-bay front facing the yard. This contains small-paned casements and a gabled half-dormer.
—	2–8 Quarry Street; 53.37423°N 2.87045°W	Quarry Street	Mid 19th century	Four stone houses with a slate roof. They are in two storeys, and each house has a single bay. At the top of the building is a cornice. Most of the windows are sashes.
—	10, 12 and 14 Quarry Street; 53.37430°N 2.87067°W	—	Early 19th century	Three brick houses with stone dressings and a slate roof. They are in two storeys. No. 14 has two bays and casement windows; Nos. 10 and 12 are each in a single bay and have sash windows. At the top of the building is a cornice. The entrances are round-headed.
—	65 and 67 Quarry Street; 53.37515°N 2.87394°W	—	Mid 19th century	A pair of brick houses with stone dressings and a slate roof. They are in two storeys, and each house has a single bay. At the top of the building is a cornice. In the ground floor No. 65 has an inserted shop window, and No. 67 has a casement window with an entablature. The entrances are paired. and have architraves, friezes, and cornices.
—	69–75 Quarry Street; 53.37530°N 2.87418°W	—	Mid 19th century	Five brick houses with stone dressings and a slate roof. They are in two storeys, and each house has a single bay. At the top of the building is a cornice. Most of the windows are sashes. There are wedge lintels over the windows and the entrances.
—	81–87 Quarry Street; 53.37563°N 2.87455°W	—	Mid 19th century	Four stone houses with a slate roof. They are in two storeys, and each house has a single bay. The windows are sashes.
Woolton Baths	Quarry Street South; 53.373748°N 2.8700862°W		1893	Example of a rare village swimming baths. Baroque Revival style, single storey building with slate roof. Externally composed of red brick accompanied by red sandstone and terracotta dressings. Main entrance block is entirely red sandstone.
Water Tower	Reservoir Road; 53.38007°N 2.87435°W		c. 1900	The water tower is in stone with an iron tank. In the base is a round-headed window and an entrance with an architrave. Above are paired lancets. The tank is decorated with pilasters and round-headed recesses. At the top is a consoled cornice and a handrail.
Gateacre Grange	Rose Brow; 53.3829°N 2.8666°W	—	1866	A large house in red sandstone with a slate roof, designed by Cornelius Sherlock for Andrew Barclay Walker, and extended in 1883. The house was later used as a home for retired seamen, and after that converted into apartments. It has an irregular plan, and is in two storeys with attics. Its features include two-storey square gabled bay windows, and mullioned and transomed windows.
House to north of Gateacre Grange	Rose Brow; 53.38326°N 2.86734°W	—	1787	A stone house with a slate roof, it is in two storeys and has a four-bay front. At the top of the house is a cornice. On the front is a bay window and a porch, both canted, and on the rear another canted bay window, this having two storeys. The windows are sashes.
Lodge, stables and coach house, Gateacre Grange	Rose Brow; 53.38308°N 2.86724°W	—	Late 1860s	Probably designed by Cornelius Sherlock, these buildings surround three sides of a courtyard. They are in stone with slate roofs. Features include coach openings, roundels, sash and casement windows, and an octagonal louvre.
Rose Cottage	1A Rose Brow; 53.38363°N 2.86772°W		Early 19th century	A house and a shop, the latter dating from the 1860s. They are in stone with a slate roof. The house is in two storeys, and has a three-bay front with a gabled porch. The shop is in one storey and an attic, and has a canted corner bay containing an entrance, with two bays to the left and one to the right. There are gabled dormers in the roof. All the windows are casements.
—	1–5 Rose Brow; 53.38353°N 2.86765°W		Early to mid 19th century	A terrace of five brick houses with a slate roof. The terrace is in two storeys, and each house has a single-bay front. Above the entrance and the windows are wedge lintels, and the windows are a mix of sashes and casements.
Golf Lodge	School Lane; 53.36674°N 2.86626°W		Early 19th century	A stone lodge with a hipped slate roof. It is in a single storey, with two bays on the front, and three on the sides. Along the top of the lodge is a cornice. On the front one window is sashed, and the other is blind.
Dining hall, Much Woolton School	St Mary's Street; 53.37483°N 2.86984°W		1849	This originated as a school, and has been converted into a dining hall. It is built in stone with a slate roof, is in two storeys, and has a four-bay front. In the centre is a gabled projection with a double stairway leading up to a pointed entrance. The gable contains a roundel, and is surmounted by a bellcote. The windows are small-pane casements.
Hunt's Cross	Speke Road; 53.35916°N 2.85669°W		Uncertain	The remaining parts of the stone cross consist of a fragment of the shaft, sitting on a square base on two square stone steps. It is surrounded by railings.
Hunt's Cross Station	Speke Road; 53.3605°N 2.8562°W		1873	The station building and the former stationmaster's house are in brick with a slate roof that was designed for the Cheshire Lines Committee. They are built on the side of a cutting, so that the entry front is in one storey with an attic, and on the platform side are two storeys, an attic and a basement. The attics have gabled dormers, and the other windows are sashes. Under the gables and along the eaves are decorative bargeboards. On the platform side is a cast iron balcony and a passenger bridge.
Woolton Village Cross	Speke Road; 53.37381°N 2.86554°W		Uncertain	This consists of a stone shaft on three steps, with a cross that was restored in 1913. It has a bronze beam with an inscription. The cross is surrounded by railings and stone bollards.
Woolton Hall Lodge	Speke Road; 53.37106°N 2.86406°W	—	19th century	The lodge is in stone with a slate roof. It is in two storeys and has a three-bay front. In the ground floor are casement windows with segmental heads, and in the upper floor the windows are sashes with wedge lintels.
Oak Farmhouse	Springwood Road; 53.36183°N 2.87146°W	—	17th century	The farmhouse is in stone with a roof of slate and stone slate. It has two storeys and a front of four bays. The first two bays are recessed, and the third bay is gabled. The windows are a mix of sliding sashes and casements. Some of the windows are mullioned, one is transomed, and one of the mullioned window has five lights.
Woolton Tower, Tower House, and Towers Cottage	Tower Way; 53.3809°N 2.8686°W		c. 1850s	A pair of houses, with a cottage behind, in stone with slate roofs. They have two storeys and incorporate a turret with an embattled parapet. Other features include a stone verandah, a balcony, a canted oriel window, and flat-topped dormers.
Gateway, Woolton Hall Park	Woolton High Street; 53.37350°N 2.86709°W		18th century	This consists of a pair of square stone gate piers. They are decorated with bands and a triglyph frieze, and each has a dentilled cornice and a ball finial. The gates are in iron and have a scroll decoration.
Woodleigh	Woolton High Street; 53.37379°N 2.86718°W		1840s	A former lodge to Woolton Hall, it is constructed in stone with a tiled roof, and stands in a central reservation. The lodge is in a single storey with an attic, and has a front of two bays, the second bay projecting forward. At the entrance is a two-column Doric portico with an Ionic entablature. Above the ground floor are a frieze and a cornice, and in the attic are decorated panels.
Woolton Manor	Woolton High Street; 53.3702°N 2.8702°W	—	1869	This was built as the Liverpool Convalescent Institute, and later used as a nursing home. It was designed by Thomas Worthington in Gothic Revival style, and expanded in 1875. The building is constructed in red brick with dressings in blue brick and stone, and it has slate roofs. It is in an E-plan, and includes three-storey side wings, with the central section in two storeys. All the windows are sashes.
—	2A Woolton High Street; 53.37425°N 2.86625°W	—	Early 19th century	A brick house with stone dressings and a slate roof. It is in two storeys, and has a three-bay front. At the top of the house is a cornice. The windows are sashes under wedge lintels. The central entrance is round-headed.
—	2–6 Woolton High Street; 53.37423°N 2.86646°W	—	Mid 19th century	Three brick houses with stone dressings and a slate roof. They are in two storeys with basements, and each house has a one-bay front. At the top of the building is a cornice. The windows are sashes with wedge lintels. The doorways are round-headed, the doorcases having panelled pilasters.
—	8 Woolton High Street; 53.37419°N 2.86663°W	—	Early 19th century	A brick house with stone dressings and a hipped slate roof. It is in two storeys with a basement, and has a two-bay front. At the top of the house is a cornice. The windows are sashes under wedge lintels. The entrance is round-headed with a fanlight, and there is another entrance to the right.
—	10 Woolton High Street; 53.37417°N 2.86671°W	—	Early 19th century	A brick house with stone dressings and a slate roof. It is in two storeys with a basement, and has a two-bay front. At the top of the house is a cornice. The windows are sashes under wedge lintels. The entrance is round-headed with a fanlight.
—	12 Woolton High Street; 53.37413°N 2.86680°W	—	Early 19th century	A brick house with stone dressings and a hipped slate roof. It is in two storeys with a basement, and has a two-bay front. At the top of the house is a cornice. The windows are sashes under wedge lintels. The entrance is round-headed with a fanlight.
—	14 and 16 Woolton High Street; 53.37381°N 2.86814°W	—	Early 19th century	A pair of brick houses with stone dressings and a slate roof. They are in two storeys and have a front of three bays. At the top of the house is a cornice. The windows are sashes under wedge lintels. In the central bay is a pair of round-headed entrances, with a blind window above.
—	20–28 Woolton High Street; 53.3736°N 2.8689°W	—	Mid 19th century	A terrace of five brick houses with stone dressings and a slate roof. They are in three storeys, and the houses have one or two-bay fronts. At the top of the building is a frieze and a cornice. The windows have wedge lintels, and most are sashes. In the ground floor are canted bay windows.
—	30 and 32 Woolton High Street; 53.37353°N 2.86918°W	—	Early 19th century	Two brick houses with stone dressings and a slate roof. They are in two storeys and have a front of three bays. At the top of the building is a cornice. The windows are sashes under wedge lintels. The entrances are round-headed, and in the centre is a round-headed entry.
Cliff Cottage	Woolton Hill Road; 53.38238°N 2.87098°W		Early 19th century	A stone house with a slate roof. It is in two storeys, and has a three-bay front, the first bay being higher and projecting forward under a gable. The windows are mullioned, and the entrance has a four-centred head. On the right side is a richly decorated bargeboard.
North gate piers, walls and railings, Allerton Hall	Woolton Road; 53.36465°N 2.88307°W		Mid 19th century	There are four stone piers, with iron gates between the central piers. Elsewhere there are low walls carrying railings. The piers are rusticated and have entablatures.
Laundry and stables, Allerton Tower	Woolton Road; 53.37075°N 2.87922°W		1847	The outbuildings were designed by Harvey Lonsdale Elmes. They are in brick with stone dressings, have a slate roof, and are in an H-plan. The buildings are in two storeys, and contain sash windows, with lunettes in the upper floor. The central entrance has a gable containing a roundel.
Lodge and gate piers, Allerton Tower	Woolton Road; 53.36814°N 2.87855°W		1847	The lodge and gate piers were designed by Harvey Lonsdale Elmes. The lodge is stuccoed with a slate roof. It is in a single storey and has a two-bay front. On the front is a circular Doric porch leading to a concave entrance; the porch is surmounted by a cupola. The windows are round-headed sashes in square-headed architraves. The stone gate piers are rusticated with cornices, and round-headed openings.
Orangery, Allerton Tower	Woolton Road; 53.37043°N 2.87884°W		1847	The orangery was designed by Harvey Lonsdale Elmes as part of his plans for the house, Allerton Tower. The house was demolished in the 1920s, and the orangery is without its glass. It extends for 14 bays and has a Tuscan colonnade. There are pavilions at the ends, the one on the right having a Tuscan porch.
Springwood Lodge	Woolton Road; 53.36503°N 2.88397°W		1839	The lodge to Springfield House is built in stone with a hipped slate roof. It is in a single storey, and has a two-bay front. On the front are pilasters, a cornice and a parapet. The windows are sashes with architraves.
Springwood House	Woolton Road; 53.3638°N 2.8848°W		1839	A stone house with a hipped roof. It is in two storeys, and has a five-bay front, the central three bays projecting forward. At the top of the house is a cornice and a parapet. The windows are sashes with architraves. At the centre of the entrance front is a projecting single-storey porch with pilasters and a pierced parapet, and with flanking first-floor balconies.
Corporation offices	Woolton Street; 53.37373°N 2.86548°W		Early 19th century	Originally a house, later used as offices, it is in brick with stone dressings and a slate roof. The house has two storeys, a three-bay front, and two bays on the sides. The windows are sashes with architraves. The ground floor of the right bay has a double window. The doorway is round-headed; it has an architrave with a keystone and spandrels, a pulvinated frieze, and a cornice.
Elephant Public House	Woolton Street; 53.3755°N 2.8668°W		Early 19th century	Originating as a house, later a public house, rebuilt in about 1930 by Harold E. Davies and Son. It is a roughcast building with a slate roof. It is in one and two storeys, and has a four-bay front. Most of the windows are sashes. On the ground floor is a five-light window. Above this are three balconies; under the central balcony is an elephant's head.
Street lamp	Woolton Street; 53.37499°N 2.86681°W		1873	The lamp standard stands on a roundabout at the road junction with Allerton Road. It is in iron, and has foliated scrolls with lions' heads at its feet. The standard is tapering, and has rope moulding, with acanthus and palm decoration at the base. It carries two cross-arms supported by scrolled brackets, and three 20th-century lamp holders.
Greenbank	2 Woolton Street; 53.37593°N 2.86737°W	—	Before 1840	A brick house with stone dressings and a slate roof. It is in two storeys, and has a three-bay front. At the top of the house is a cornice. The windows are sashes under wedge lintels. In the centre is a round-headed entrance.
—	4 and 6 Woolton Street; 53.37577°N 2.86732°W		1840s	This originated as two brick houses with stone dressings and a slate roof. It is in two storeys with a basement, and has a five-bay front. At the top of the house is a cornice. The windows are sashes under wedge lintels. In the second and fourth bays are round-headed entrances. At the rear is a wing with sliding-sash windows.
Stable block	4 and 6 Woolton Street; 53.37574°N 2.86764°W	—	1840s	The stables are built in brick with stone dressings and a slate roof. They are in two storeys, and have a four-bay front, with a gable in the third bay. The other bays contain pitching holes in the upper storey. There are sash windows in the ground floor of the first and second bays.
Former farm building	25 Woolton Street; 53.37452°N 2.86541°W	—	Early 19th century (probable)	The building is in stone with a slate roof. It is in an L-plan and has windows of varying types. One side has a gabled entrance with a loft door.
Salisbury Farm Dairy	29 Woolton Street; 53.37435°N 2.86582°W	—	Late 18th century	This originated as a farmhouse, later converted into a house and shop. It is a roughcast building with a slate roof. It is in two storeys, and has a three-bay front. There is a gable in the first bay, and a shop front in the third bay. The windows are casements under segmental heads.
—	35 Woolton Street; 53.37367°N 2.86542°W	—	Early 19th century	A brick house with stone dressings and a slate roof. It is in two storeys, and has a two-bay front. At the top of the house is a cornice. The windows are sashes under wedge lintels. Above the round-headed entrance is a fanlight.
—	35A Woolton Street; 53.37363°N 2.86542°W	—	Early 19th century	A brick house with stone dressings and a slate roof. It is in two storeys, and has a one-bay front. At the top of the house is a cornice. The windows are sashes under wedge lintels. Above the entrance is another wedge lintel.
—	37 Woolton Street; 53.37358°N 2.86539°W	—	Early 19th century	A brick house with stone dressings and a slate roof. It is in two storeys, and has a three-bay front. At the top of the house is a cornice. The windows are sashes under wedge lintels. The central entrance has an architrave, a frieze, and a cornice.
—	39, 41 and 43 Woolton Street; 53.37351°N 2.86537°W	—	Early 19th century	A terrace of three brick houses with stone dressings and slate roofs. The houses are in two storeys, and each house has a two-bay front. At the top of the building is a cornice. The windows are sashes under wedge lintels. The round-headed entrances have architraves, imposts, and friezes.
—	45 and 47 Woolton Street; 53.37328°N 2.86536°W	—	Early 19th century	Two brick houses with stone dressings and slate roofs. The houses are in three storeys, and each house has a three-bay front. At the top of the building is a cornice. The windows are under wedge lintels, and most are sashes. The central round-headed entrances have architraves, imposts, and friezes.
The Old House	49 Woolton Street; 53.37303°N 2.86533°W	—	Early 19th century	A brick house with stone dressings and a slate roof. It is in two storeys, and has two bays on the front and on the side. The front has a pedimented gable containing a bulls-eye window. The windows are sashes with wedge lintels. Above the entrance is a fanlight.
—	51 Woolton Street; 53.37297°N 2.86530°W	—	Early 19th century	A brick house with stone dressings and a slate roof. It is in two storeys, and has a two-bay front. The windows are sashes.

== See also ==
Architecture of Liverpool

== References and notes ==
Notes

Citations

Sources

- Pollard, Richard; Pevsner, Nikolaus (2006), Lancashire: Liverpool and the South-West, The Buildings of England, New Haven and London: Yale University Press, ISBN 0-300-10910-5
