= The Calderstones =

Neolithic sandstones in Liverpool, UK

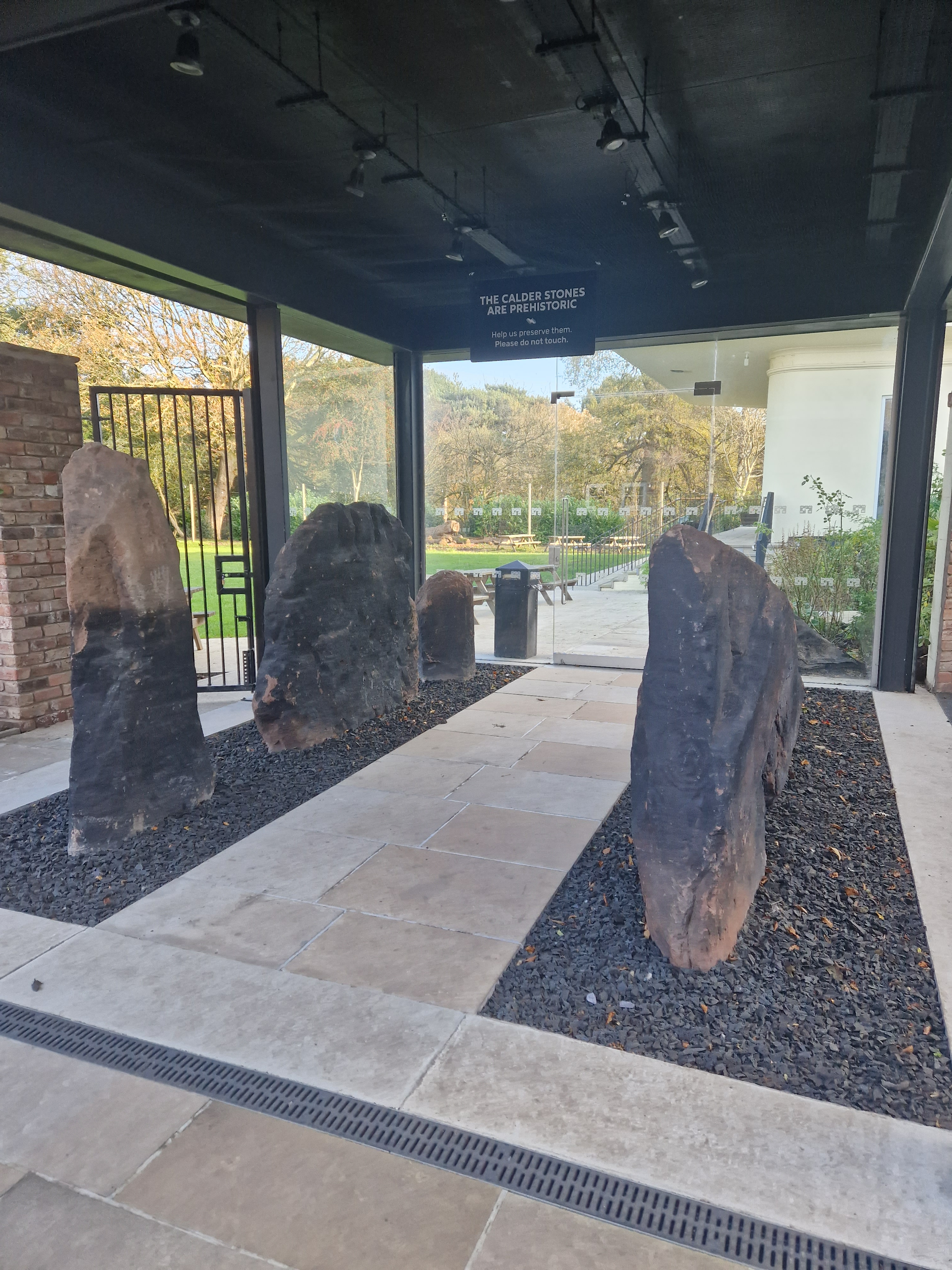
- Interactive map of The Calderstones
- 53°22′54″N 2°53′39″W
- Type: Chambered tomb
- Periods: Neolithic
- Location: Near Allerton
- Region: Merseyside, England

The Calderstones are a collection of six neolithic sandstone monoliths remaining from a dolmen in Calderstones Park, Liverpool, England. They are a scheduled monument under the Ancient Monuments and Archaeological Areas Act 1979. They are thought to be the oldest monument in Liverpool, having been part of a megalithic tomb constructed between 4000 and 3000 BC.

The stones are housed in the Harthill Greenhouses in Calderstones Park, having been moved from their previous location in an enclosure just outside the park gates in 1954 to protect them from further weathering. Nearby Robin Hood's Stone was originally one of the Calderstones, and has been relocated.
