= St Stephen's Church, Gateacre =

Coordinates: 53.3868°N 2.8559°W

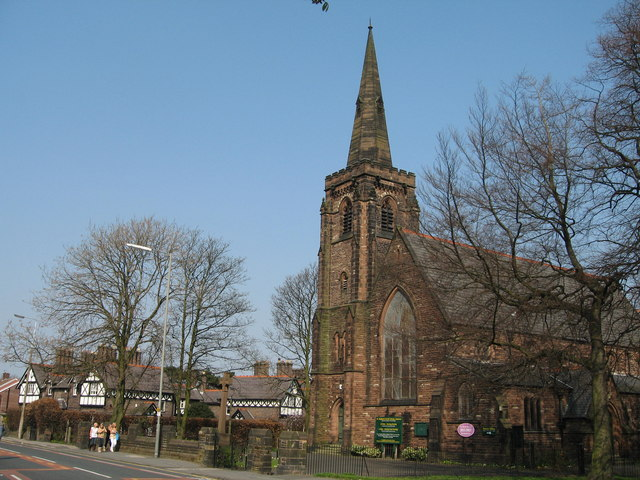
- St Stephen's Church, Gateacre, from the southwest

- Location in Merseyside
- OS grid reference: SJ 432 881
- Location: Belle Vale Road, Gateacre, Liverpool, Merseyside
- Country: England
- Denomination: Anglican
- Churchmanship: Evangelical, Gently Charismatic
- Website: St Stephen, Gateacre

History
- Status: Parish church
- Consecrated: 11 February 1874

Architecture
- Functional status: Active
- Heritage designation: Grade II
- Designated: 14 March 1975
- Architect: Cornelius Sherlock
- Architectural type: Church
- Style: Gothic Revival
- Groundbreaking: 1872
- Completed: 1874

Specifications
- Materials: Sandstone, slate roof

Administration
- Province: York
- Diocese: Liverpool
- Archdeaconry: Liverpool
- Deanery: Liverpool South Childwall
- Parish: St Stephen, Gateacre

Clergy
- Rector: Rev’d Thomas Langdon-Smith

St Stephen's Church is in Belle Vale Road, Gateacre, Liverpool, Merseyside, England. It is an active Anglican parish church in the deanery of Liverpool South Childwall, the archdeaconry of Liverpool, and the diocese of Liverpool. Its benefice is united with those of Christ Church, Netherley, and St Mark, Childwall Valley, to form the Gateacre Team. The church is recorded in the National Heritage List for England as a designated Grade II listed building.

== History ==
The church was built between 1872 and 1874, and designed by the local architect Cornelius Sherlock. The foundation stone was laid on 1 April 1872, and the church was consecrated on 11 February 1874 by the bishop of Chester. Originally it was a chapel of ease to All Saints, Childwall, and became a separate parish in 1893. A south vestry was added to the church in 1897.

== Architecture ==
=== Exterior ===
St Stephen's is constructed in rock-faced sandstone with ashlar dressings, and has a slate roof with a tiled ridge. It is designed in the architectural style of about 1300. The plan of the church consists of a five-bay nave with a clerestory, north and south aisles under lean-to roofs, a south porch, a chancel with north and south vestries, and a northwest steeple. The tower has angle buttresses rising to crocketed gables. It has a west entrance, and on the west face are paired lancet windows flanking a niche containing a statue. At the top of the tower is a frieze and an embattled parapet with gargoyles. There are lucarnes on the spire. The windows along the sides of the aisles have two or three lights with cusped ogee heads. Along the clerestory are rose windows. The west window has four lights, the east window has three, and the windows in the vestries have two lights.

=== Interior ===
Inside the church are five-bay arcades carried on round columns. The roof of the nave is scissor-braced, and that of the chancel is coffered. The stained glass in the west window, dating from 1883, was designed by Edward Burne-Jones and coloured by William Morris and attributed to Morris & Co., and that in the east window, dated 1880, is by Frederick Preedy. The maker of the two-manual pipe organ is not known. It was cleaned and repaired in about 1900 by Gray and Davison. The organ was repaired again in 1939 by Rushworth and Dreaper. However, it needed major repairs in the 1990s and was modernized with poor electronic components.

== See also ==
- Grade II listed buildings in Liverpool-L25
