= Allerton Golf Club House =

House in Liverpool, Merseyside, England

Coordinates: 53°22′21″N 2°53′14″W

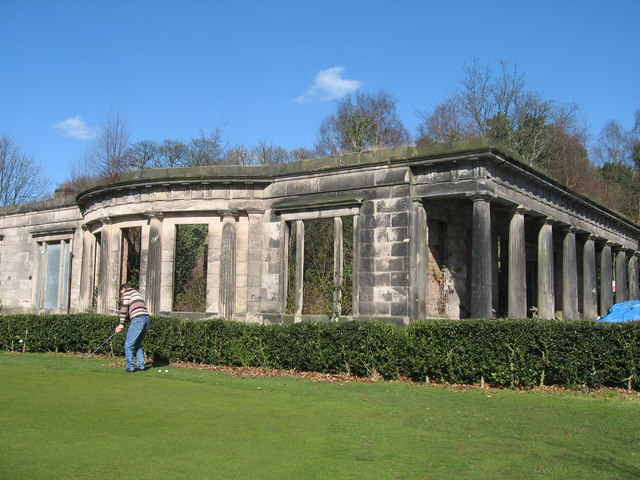
- Interactive map of the Allerton Golf Club House area

General information
- Architectural style: Neo-classical
- Location: Liverpool, England
- Completed: 1815
- Client: Jacob Fletcher

Design and construction
- Architect: Harrison of Chester

Allerton Golf Club House is a ruined Neoclassical building located in Allerton, Liverpool, England. Completed in 1815 by the architect Harrison of Chester for the owner Jacob Fletcher, the building was built on the site of a previous one which had been destroyed by a fire. This replacement building was occupied by the Fletcher family for 104 years before being purchased in 1923 by the Liverpool Corporation, who converted the mansion into a clubhouse for a newly built golf course. On 21 November 1944 another fire broke out, leaving the building in ruins. On 14 March 1975 the ruins became a Grade II listed structure.

To the south-east of the house is a sandstone obelisk which belonged to the original 18th century house. It is of square plan, and is mounted on plinth. The obelisk is Grade II listed.

== See also ==
- Listed buildings in the United Kingdom
- Grade II listed buildings in Liverpool-L25
