= Speke and Garston Coastal Reserve =

Nature reserve in Liverpool, UK

Coordinates: 53.342°N 2.894°W

View over the nature reserve and Mersey, 2019

Speke and Garston Coastal Reserve is a park in south Liverpool, Merseyside, England. It was developed on part of the former site of Liverpool John Lennon Airport.
