= Southport Flower Show =

Garden show held for four days in August

Coordinates: 53.644297°N 3.019722°W

- Formation: 1924
- Registration no.: Charity No: 1000698
- Legal status: Charity
- Headquarters: Victoria Park Rotten Row Southport PR8 1RX
- General Manager: Alan Adams
- Website: www.southportflowershow.co.uk

Southport Flower Show, held at Victoria Park in Southport, is the largest independent flower show in the United Kingdom. It was originally started in 1924 by the local council, but since 1986 has been operated by Southport Flower Show company, which is a registered charity. It is held annually for four days in late August and has attendances of over 80,000. The patron of Southport Flower Show since 1996 is Professor Stefan Buczacki.

The UK's largest and longest running independent flower show, each year it attracts many celebrities from all over the world, from television and film to music and sport. As well as flowers, the show includes other attractions such as cookery demonstrations, gala dinners, music and horse riding displays.

== Gallery ==
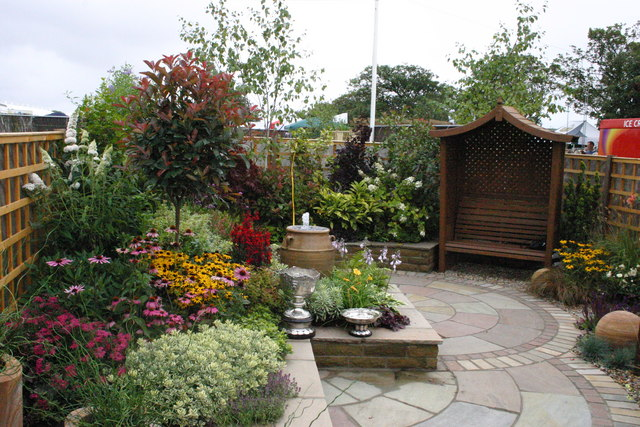
Southport Flower Show 2006

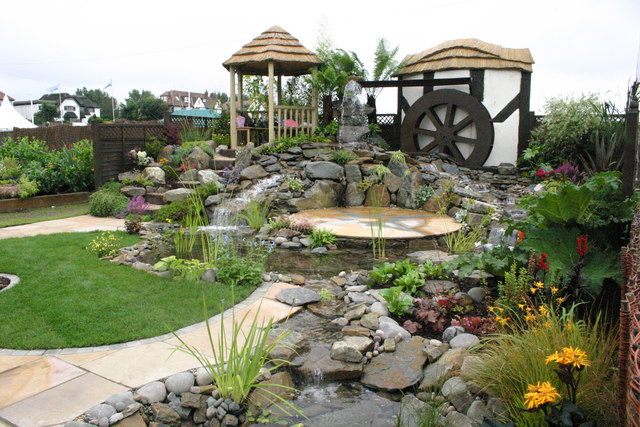
Southport Flower Show 2006

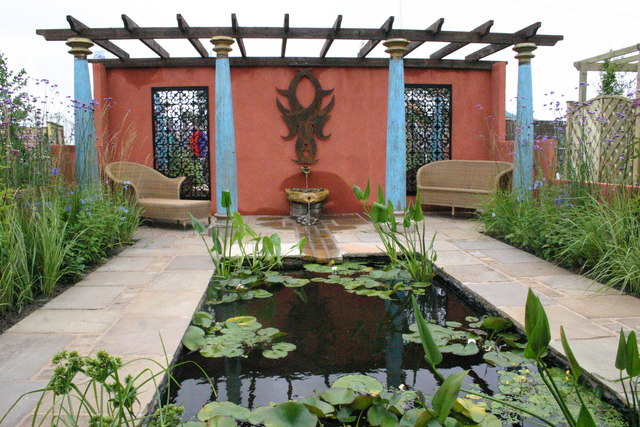
Southport Flower Show 2006

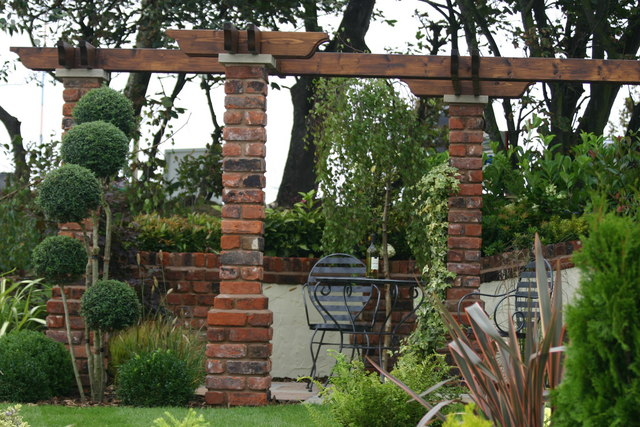
Southport Flower Show 2006

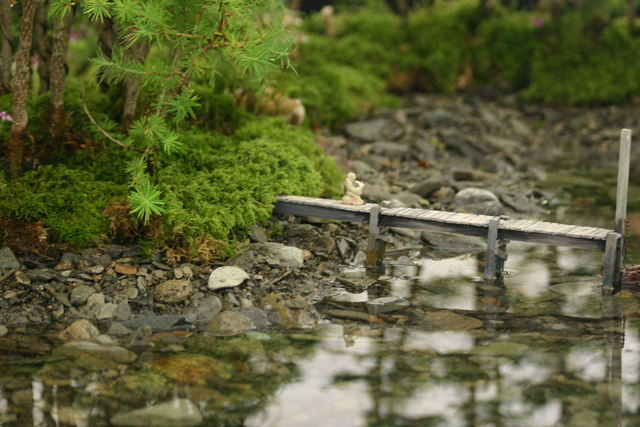
Southport Flower Show 2006

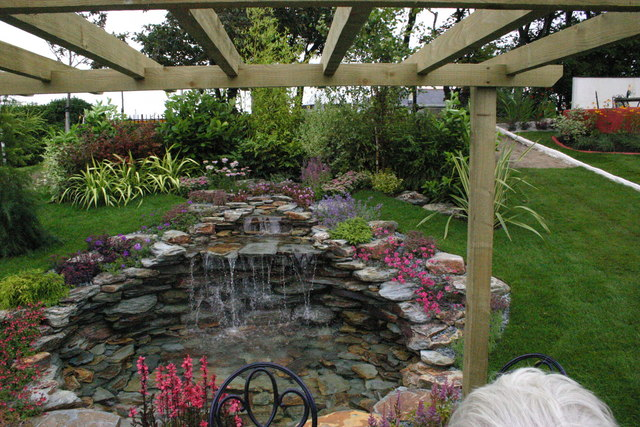
Southport Flower Show 2006
