= Calderstones Park =

Public park in Liverpool, England

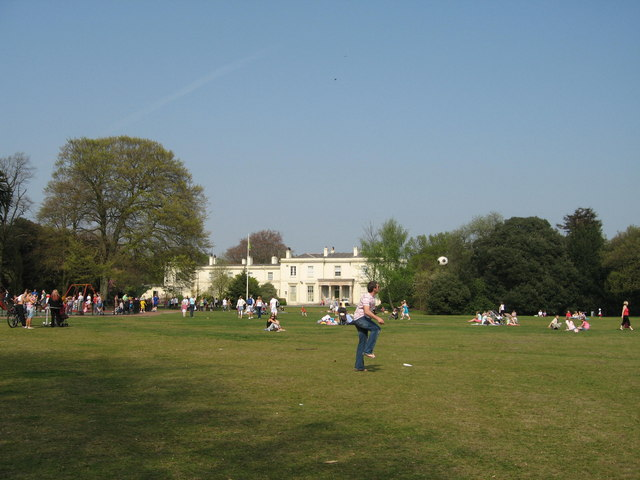
- Calderstones Park, showing Calderstones House
- Interactive map of Calderstones Park
- Type: Public park
- Location: Liverpool, England
- Coordinates: 53°22′54″N 2°53′39″W
- Area: 126 acres (0.51 km^{2})
- Created: 1905
- Operator: Liverpool City Council
- Open: All year
- Status: Open
- Website: liverpool.gov.uk/parks-and-greenspaces/local-parks-and-greenspaces/calderstones-park/

Calderstones Park is a public park in the Allerton area of Liverpool, England, about 4 miles (6 km) south-east of the city centre. The 126 acres (0.51 km^{2}) park is mainly a family park. Within it there are a variety of attractions including a playground, a botanical garden and places of historical interest. There is a lake in the park with geese and ducks, and the Calderstones Mansion House, which features a café and a children's play area.

== Features ==
=== The Calderstones ===
The Calderstones are six neolithic sandstone monoliths that formed part of a burial monument 4,000 years ago. They are a scheduled monument under the Ancient Monuments and Archaeological Areas Act 1979.

The nearby Robin Hood's Stone was originally also one of the Calderstones, and has been relocated.

=== Calderstones House ===
The mansion house was built in 1828 for Joseph Need Walker. The house is of Georgian style, though it has been subject to alterations over the years, and was used as council offices for some decades until 2012. The extensive stables and coachhouse remain at the rear of the house. Since c.2013, the house has been the headquarters of The Reader, a national charity which promotes reading and literature. The charity converted an outbuilding into a children's attraction called the Storybarn.

=== The Allerton Oak ===
One of the park's two most ancient features, estimated at 1,000 years old, is an oak tree. According to legend, the ancient local Hundred Court sat beneath its branches. Its dilapidated state is said to be due to the explosion of the gunpowder ship Lottie Sleigh over three miles away on the River Mersey in 1864. It is dependent upon a number of props that hold it up.

Acorns and leaves from the oak were sent to soldiers by their families during World War II, such was the reputation of this tree. The tree was named England's 'tree of the year' in 2019 by the Woodland Trust.

=== Botanical garden ===
After World War II, Percy Conn, the new Superintendent of Liverpool Parks, had the vision to recreate the Liverpool Botanic Garden of William Roscoe and John Shepherd from the Mount Pleasant days, in the Harthill Estate grounds at Calderstones Park. This work was started in 1951 and completed in 1964, when the set of 16 connected glasshouses was formally opened. Calderstones botanical garden contained almost 4,000 species of plants brought from all over the world by merchants and other travellers.

As funding was very tight post-war, low-grade spruce, rather than teak, was used to build the glasshouses, and by 1979 they had reached the end of their useful lives, but no money was available to rebuild them. The botanical importance of the park encouraged further horticultural improvements, such as the creation of a Japanese garden by park apprentices in 1969, and the introduction of a 'bog garden' linked to the artificial lake. In 1984 the glasshouses were closed and the plants transported to the Liverpool City nursery at Garston, where they remained for the next 23 years. Some of the plants were occasionally seen at Southport Flower Shows over this period. In 2007/2008 a third of the plants were re-housed in four glasshouses within Croxteth Hall's walled gardens, when Garston Nursery was closed as a consequence of the outsourcing of Liverpool's park & garden maintenance work.

=== Nature reserve ===
The dry nature reserve, created on the site of a council works depot, was featured on the BBC 2 programme Gardeners' World on 15 March 2024.

== Tennis tournament ==
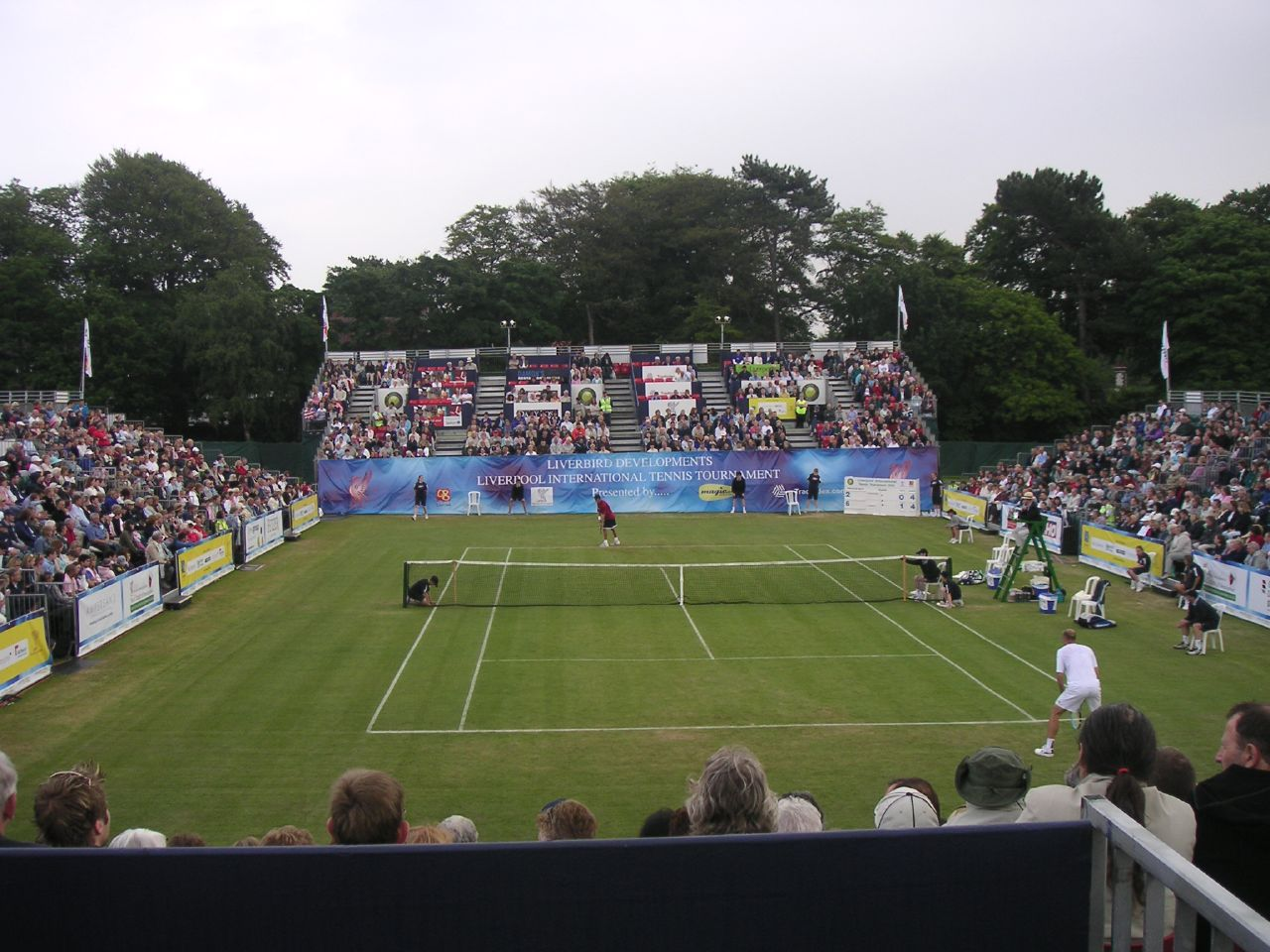
Calderstones Park's tennis court

Set in the park, the Liverpool International Tennis Tournament began in 2002 (with the women's event beginning in 2006) and has attracted many well known tennis stars such as Martina Navratilova, Ivan Ljubičić and David Ferrer. In 2008 the tournament attracted over 2,500 spectators.

== See also ==
- List of parks and open spaces in Merseyside
