= Victoria Park, Southport =

Park in Southport, Merseyside, England

Coordinates: 53.644297°N 3.019722°W

Victoria Park
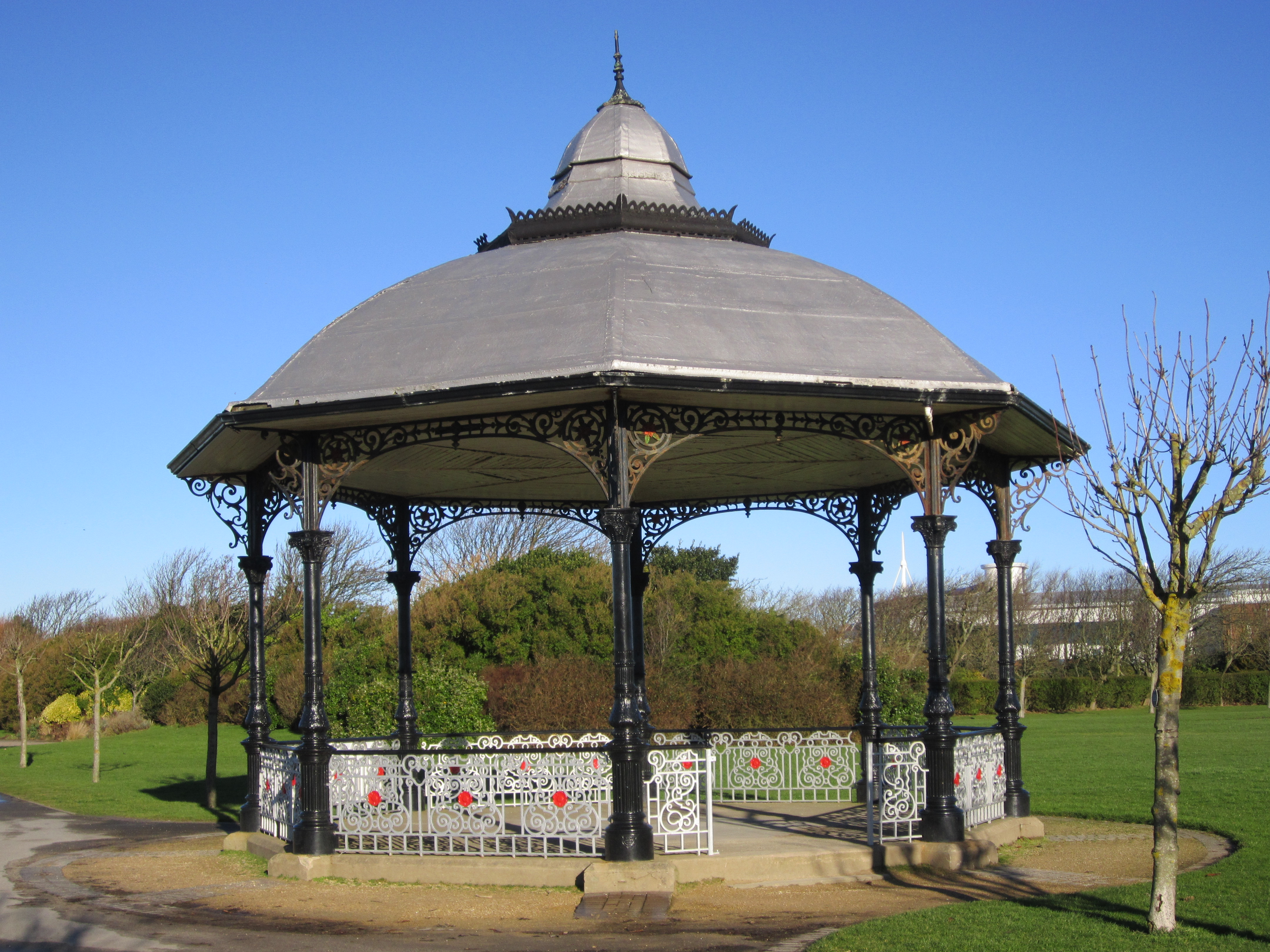
- Bandstand at Victoria Park

- Location within Southport town centre
- Type: Public park
- Location: Southport, England

Victoria Park Southport, Merseyside, England, is a public park. It is the venue for Southport Flower Show and several musical events. The show is traditionally held in August each year and has attracted both national and international film and TV coverage since the 1950s

The park is also home to the British Musical Fireworks Championships which moved to the park from its previous home on Southport's Marine Lake in 2013. The British Musical Fireworks Championship is no ordinary competition, as each UK competitor who enters are required to synchronise their display to music, to win the competition.

The park is also used for the RAF Woodvale Rally, that had to move to the location after Asbestos was discovered on the RAF base, just outside Formby in 2012. However this was cancelled in 2018 following a dispute with the organisers.

It is also home to Southport & Birkdale Croquet Club.

There are two crown bowling greens and pavilion which is home to Victoria Park Bowling Club.
