= Warbreck Park =

Public park in Liverpool, England

Coordinates: 53.4671°N 2.9570°W

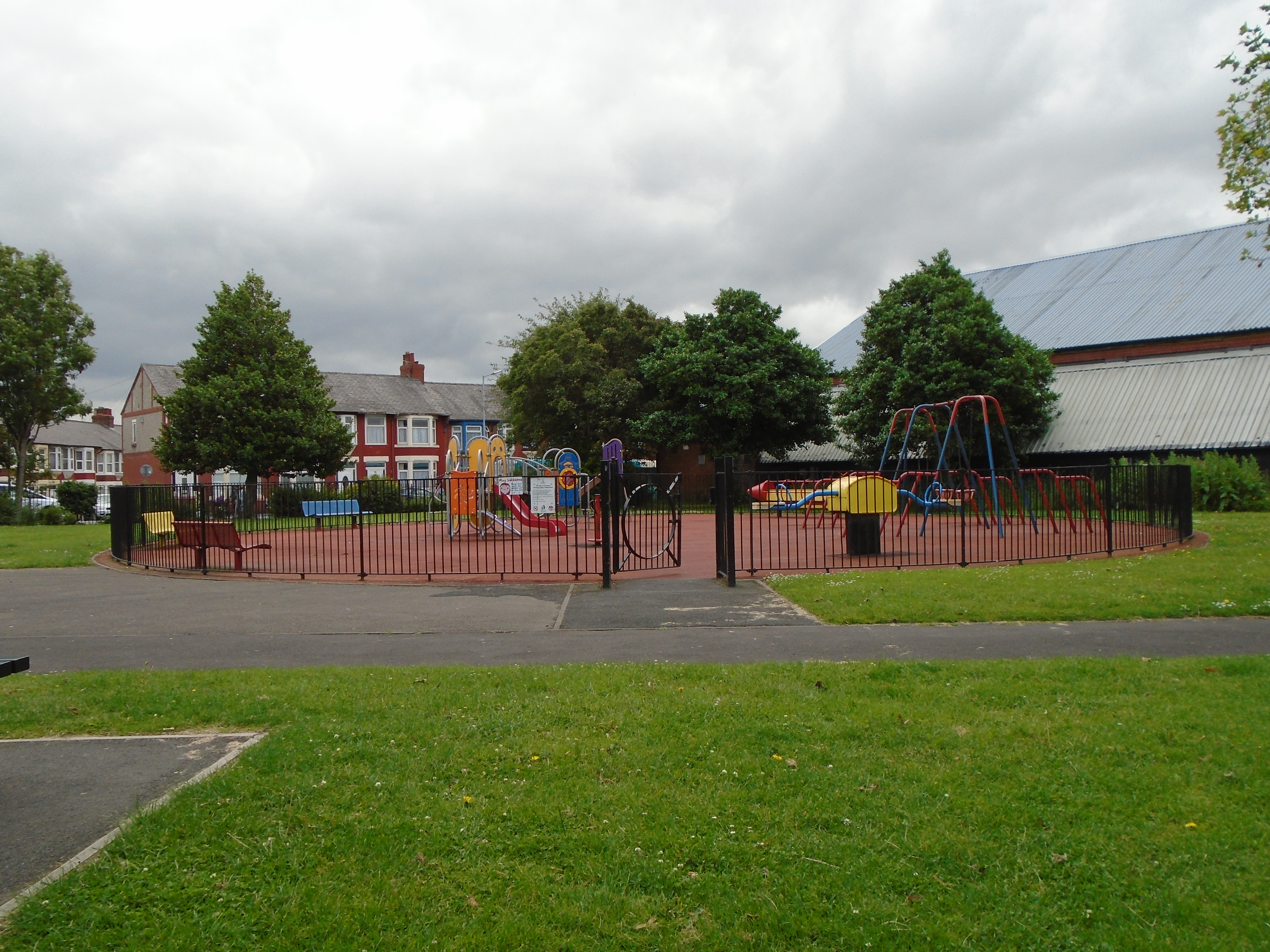
Childs play area

Warbreck Park is a park in Walton, Liverpool, located on the site of the former Liverpool Corporation Tramways depot. The main access is from Warbreck Moor. Warbreck Park used to house a bowling green, which was removed in the 1980s. Its main facilities are now a children's play area and an adventure play area.
