= Robin Hood's Stone =

Scheduled monument in Liverpool, UK

Coordinates: 53°22′15″N 2°54′13″W

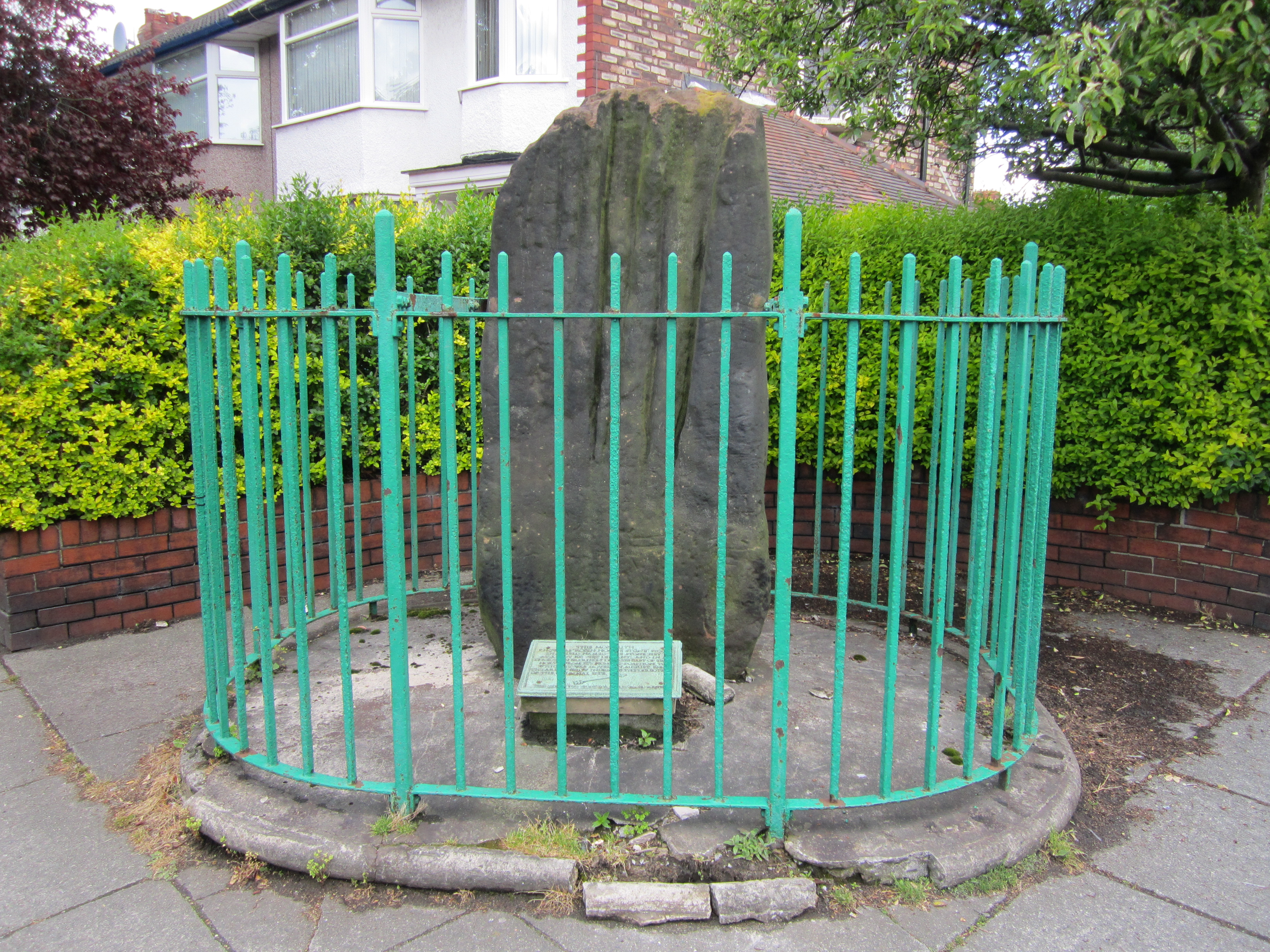
Robin Hood's Stone

Robin Hood's Stone, also known as The Archer Stone is a Bronze Age standing stone and scheduled monument in Liverpool, UK.

== Description ==
It was originally part of the nearby Calderstones. Since 1928 it has stood at the junction of Archerfield Road and Booker Avenue. Prior to this, it stood 60 metres (66 yd) away in a field then named The Stone Hey, but was moved due to a housing development.

Robin Hood's Stone is rectangular and measures about 2 metres (6 ft 7 in) high by 0.9 metres (2 ft 11 in) wide by 0.4 metres (1 ft 4 in) thick. It features cup marks similar to those at the Calderstones.

== Name ==
The stone is named for a local legend that its visible grooves are the result of it being used by medieval archers to sharpen arrowheads. Liverpool Echo has reported that there is no evidence for this. Mark and Michelle Rosney's Secret Liverpool states that natural weathering and erosion is equally possible, and that the stone has no actual connection to Robin Hood.
