= Victoria Park, St Helens =

Park in St Helens, Merseyside, England

Coordinates: 53.463°N 2.744°W

Victoria Park is an urban park located in central St Helens, Merseyside. The park is managed by the Metropolitan Borough of St Helens.

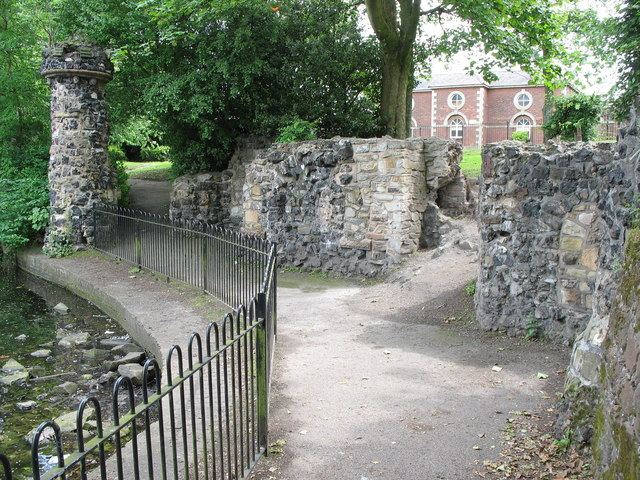
The folly at Victoria Park St Helens

== History ==
The area was originally owned by John Andsell who built the Victorian Italianate style Grade II listed Mansion House along with orangery, walled gardens and an ornate fountain. The park was opened in 1886 as Cowley Hill Park by St Helens Council and renamed on 21 June 1887 for Queen Victoria's Golden Jubilee. In 1994 the council sold The Mansion House to a charity Age UK which uses the property as a venue for weddings.

== Facilities ==
There is a skate park, a ball court, 2 play areas, tennis courts, a bike area, and a wetland habitat.

== Parkrun ==
A parkrun takes place in the grounds every Saturday morning at 9:00 am.
