= Allerton Hall =

Listed building in Merseyside, England

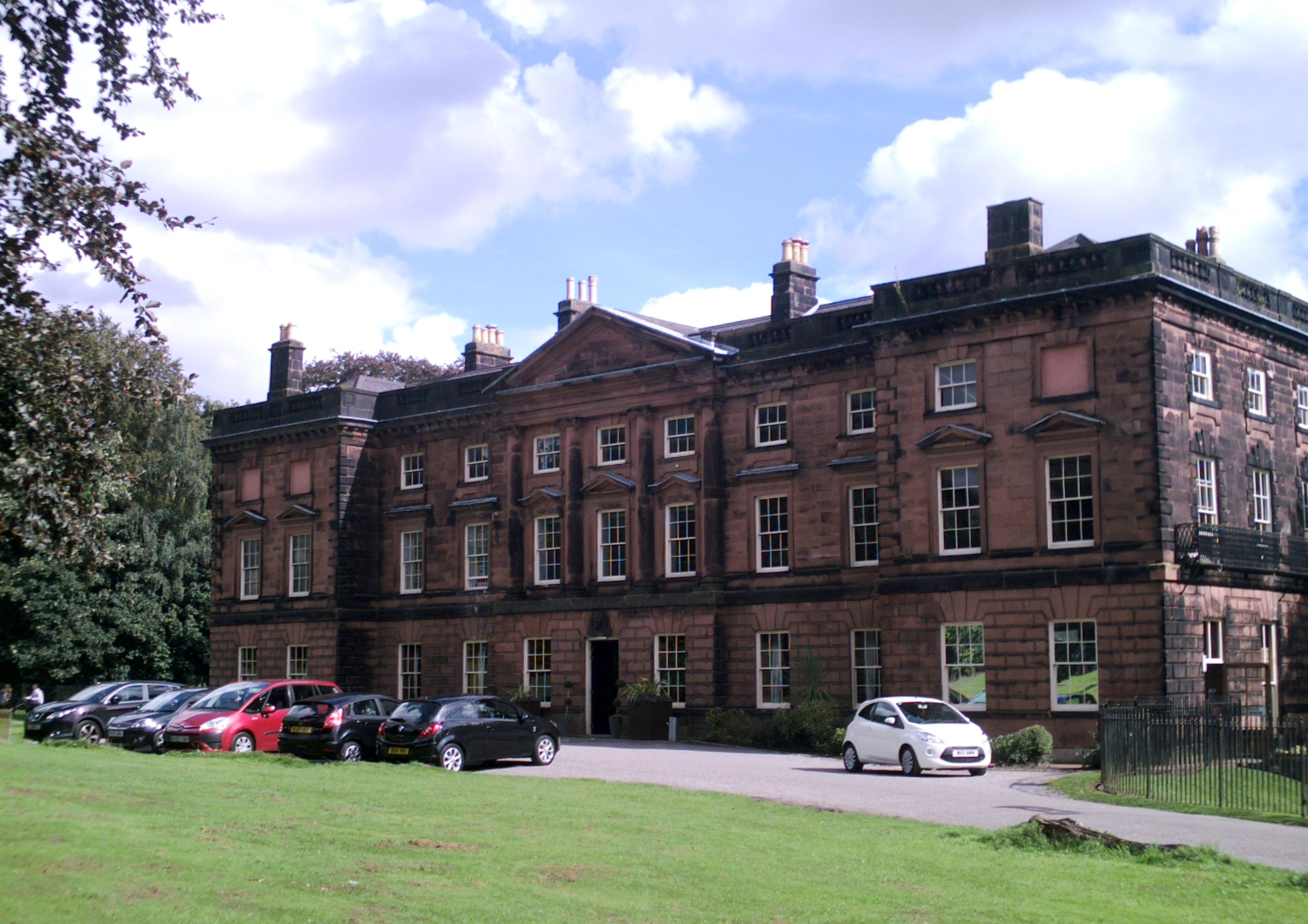
- Allerton Hall
- Interactive map of Allerton Hall

General information
- Type: Country house
- Architectural style: Palladian
- Location: Clarke's Gardens, Allerton, Merseyside, England
- Coordinates: 53°21′48″N 2°52′45″W
- Years built: c. 1736
- Client: John Hardman
- Designations

Listed Building – Grade II*
- Official name: Allerton Hall
- Designated: 14 March 1975
- Reference no.: 1063751

Allerton Hall is a Grade II* listed former country house in Clarke's Gardens, Allerton, Merseyside, England. It was built in about 1736 for the Hardman family. It presently operates as a public house.

== History ==
During the medieval period the manor of Allerton was held by the Lathom family.

During her long widowhood, Elizabeth Lathom, the wife of Richard Lathom (1563–1602), occupied Allerton Hall. She gave her son, Edward Lathom, the occupation and profit of "this my hall in Allerton". Her other son, Richard Lathom, a Royalist, fought alongside his uncles in the English Civil War. Richard survived the war but his Estate was "forfeited in the name of treason" by Cromwell's parliament in 1652 and the commissioners of parliament subsequently confiscated the estate. Allerton was then purchased by the Percivals who held the house until 1736 and married into the Hardman family.

When assessments were made for the hearth tax in 1666, Allerton Hall was one of the larger houses in the parish of Childwall with eight hearths; this was exceeded only by Speke Hall with twenty-one hearths and Brettargh Holt with nine.

The estate was bought for £7,700 in 1736 by James Hardman, Esq. and his brother John Hardman, and it is likely that the present house on the site, built in the Palladian style, originates from this time. Hardman was a West Indies merchant and slave trader originally from Rochdale. The Hardmans were involved in 46 slave voyages between 1729 and 1761 from Africa to the West Indies. When James died the property passed to his brother, John, who himself subsequently died in 1755.

The property then passed to James Hardman's widow, Jane Hardman, in 1756. The Hardman family continued to live at Allerton until 1795 when the house was bought from them by the abolitionist, lawyer and philanthropist, William Roscoe. Roscoe completed the building of the house, but in turn had to sell it himself in 1816 when he became bankrupt. in 1824 Roscoe sold his share to Pattison Ellames: Roscoe's ally who purchased his share of the house, his son John aged 9 is shown as Head of family in Allerton Hall in the 1851 census. Living with his Grandmother and family. Pattison's Wife Margaret Ellames nee Bradish died there in 1837 she was a descendent of the Sadlier Family. There were a number of Hardman claimants to the ownership of the hall, however, none succeeded as the family's wealth had deteriorated since selling to Roscoe.

During the American Civil War, the mansion was rented by Charles Kuhn Prioleau, an American landowner and slaver from South Carolina who financially supported the Confederate States, and who married Mary Elizabeth Hardman, known as the "Belle of Liverpool".

In 1927 the building was donated to Liverpool City Council. It was Grade II* listed in 1975. The hall was damaged by two fires, in 1994 and in 1995.

== Architecture ==
Allerton Hall is designed in the Palladian style and built in red sandstone with three storeys. It is a symmetrical building, extending over 11 bays; the central three bays and the lateral two bays on each side project forward. The central three bays form a portico with Ionic columns and a pediment. The ground floor of the building is rusticated.

Surviving the fires, are a room at the west end which has panelled walls and a stucco ceiling in the Rococo style, and parts of Roscoe's library. In the grounds to the west of the house is a sundial dated 1750.

== Present day ==
In 2009 Allerton Hall was run as a public house known as the 'Pub in the Park'. As of 2017, it is known as Allerton Hall - Farmhouse Inn.

== See also ==
- Grade II* listed buildings in Liverpool – Suburbs
