= Calderstones House =

Mansion in Liverpool, England

Calderstones Mansion House
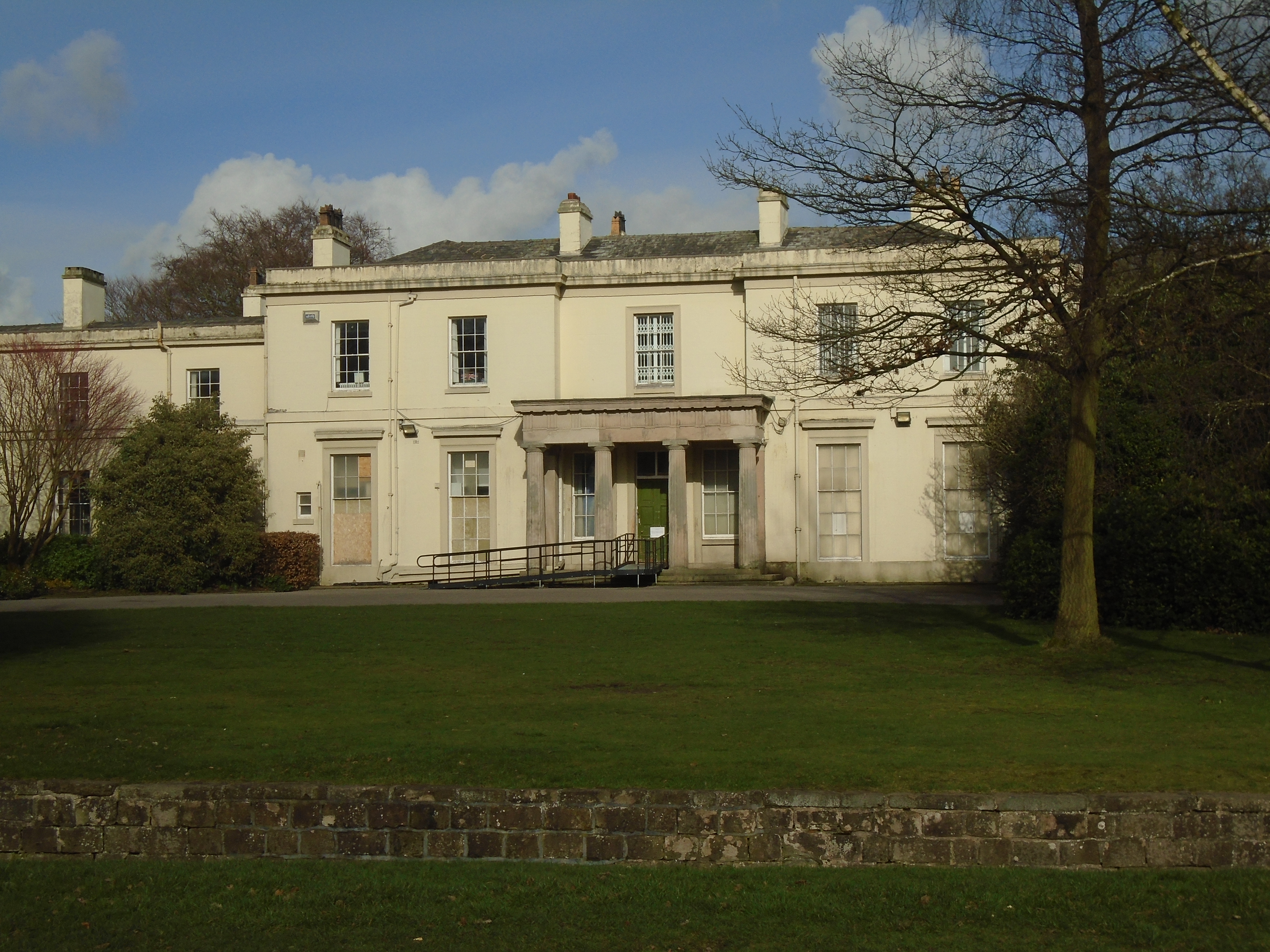
- Calderstones Mansion House
- Interactive map of the Calderstones Mansion House area

General information
- Location: Liverpool, England
- Coordinates: 53.3815°N 2.894°W
- Construction started: 1828
- Client: Joseph Need Walker

Calderstones House, Calderstones Park, Liverpool, England, is a 19th-century mansion house which is now at the centre of a public park.

The house was built in the Allerton suburb in 1828 for Joseph Need Walker, a lead shot manufacturer. It is a 'restrained neo-classical' ashlar mansion of three floors, with a separate and extensive stableyard and coach-house which was originally set in 93 acres (38 hectares) of parkland. In 1875, the house and estate were acquired by Charles MacIver, co-founder of Cunard Line, for £52,000.

In 1902, the MacIver family bequeathed the estate to Liverpool Corporation, who transformed it into a public park. They soon acquired the adjoining estate of Harthill and established the current 126 acre (51 hectares) park.

The Grade II listed building became the offices of the Liverpool Corporation's Parks and Gardens department, and in the 1940s part of the house was transformed into a self-contained flat for the Assistant Head Gardener. The 1940s also saw a neo art-deco open-air theatre constructed at the back of the house, designed by Sir Lancelot Keay.

For most of the 20th century, the mansion housed a tea-room and café and was used for wedding receptions, parties and other functions. In the 1970s the house became council offices, and it remained in that use until 2012, when the council placed the house on the market.

The Reader, a national charity centred around literature and shared reading, was given preferred bidder status in January 2013. They have a licence agreement to use the buildings for meetings, events and activities, and have a 125-year lease.

In January 2017, The Reader began redevelopment work to restore the house, having secured funding from the Heritage Lottery Fund, Liverpool City Council and independent funders. The redevelopment was completed in Autumn 2019, when it reopened as The Reader's International Centre for Shared Reading—the world's first public building dedicated to literature and wellbeing. An outbuilding was converted into a children's attraction called the Storybarn, featuring an ice cream parlour.

The redevelopment included the restoration and preservation of the Neolithic Calder Stones, which give the local area its name. The Calder Stones now form part of The Calderstones Story, an interactive, permanent exhibition at Calderstones House that tells 5,000 years of local history.
