= Devonfield Garden =

Public park in Liverpool, England

Coordinates: 53.463°N 2.966°W

Devonfield Garden is a park in north Liverpool, England. In 2010, it was one of 17 parks in the city to win a Green Flag Award.
