= Clarke's Gardens =

Park in Allerton, Liverpool, England

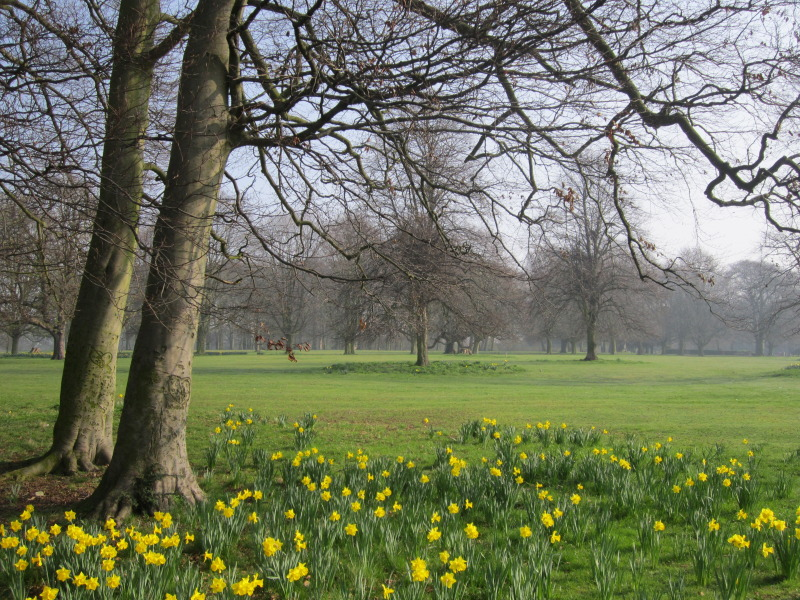
- Clarke's Gardens in early spring.
- Interactive map of Clarke's Gardens
- Type: Public park
- Location: Allerton, Liverpool
- Coordinates: 53°21′54″N 2°52′55″W
- Operator: Liverpool City Council
- Open: All year round

Clarke's Gardens is a public park in the Allerton district of south Liverpool, England. It is close to Springwood Cemetery and situated between Woolton Road and Springwood Avenue.

The park is the site of Allerton Hall, a Grade II* listed building, which was donated by the Clarke family to Liverpool City Council in 1927.

Liverpool City Council have in the past used it as a site for their free compost distribution.
