= Canalside Park =

Public park in Liverpool, England

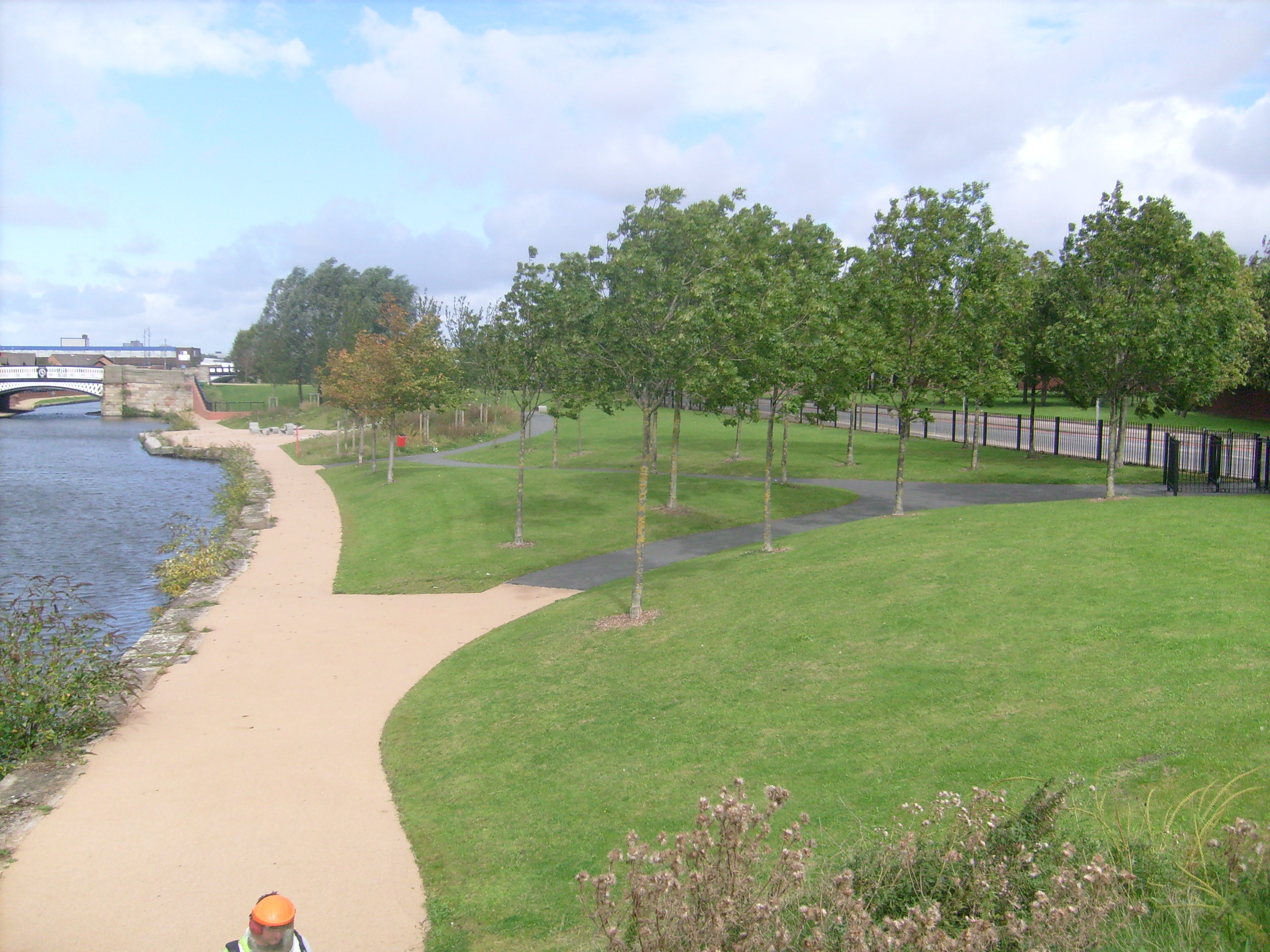
- Interactive map of Canalside Park
- Type: Public park
- Location: Vauxhall, Liverpool
- Coordinates: 53°25′27″N 2°59′19″W
- Operator: Liverpool City Council
- Open: All year round

Canalside Park is a public park in the Vauxhall district of north Liverpool, England. The park is a recent creation and is on reclaimed industrial land running alongside the Leeds and Liverpool Canal by Vauxhall Road. The park contains several wildflower areas that form part of the Roots project

From the south end of the park the entrance to Stanley Dock and the Port of Liverpool can be seen.
