= Reynolds Park =

Public park in Liverpool, England

Coordinates: 53.379°N 2.870°W

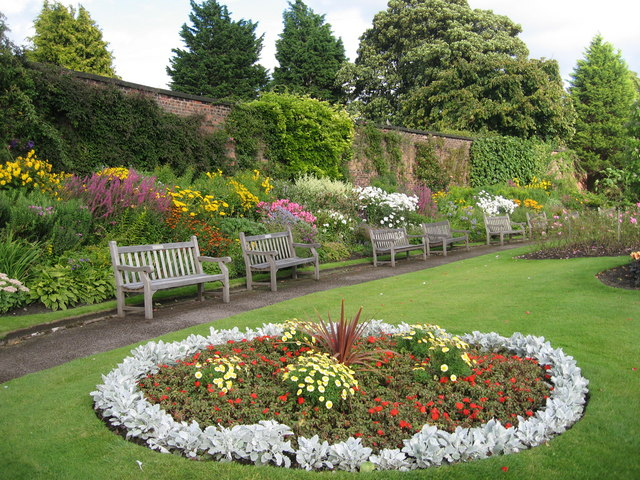
- Interactive map of Reynolds Park
- Type: Public Park
- Location: Woolton, Liverpool
- Area: 14 acres (5.7 ha)
- Created: 1929
- Operator: Liverpool City Council
- Status: Open all year

Reynolds Park is a 14-acre (57,000 m^{2}) park in Woolton, Liverpool. The origins of the park are 200 years ago, it was bequeathed to the City Council in 1926.

== History ==
Reynolds Park lies within an area that in the 19th century was the estate of a series of wealthy local businessmen.

In the late 19th century it came into the possession of the Reynolds family, who had made their fortune in the cotton trade.

In 1929 James Reynolds, last owner of the estate, donated it to the City Corporation, though his daughter continued to live at the park and was active in its development as an amenity.

In 1975 the mansion was destroyed by fire, and was replaced by a housing scheme for the elderly.

== Layout ==
The park comprises 14-acre (57,000 m^{2}) area of open lawns, formal gardens and woodland on a sloping east-facing site.

It is bounded by Church Road to the west, Woolton Hill Road to the north and Woolton Park Road to the south and east, and is surrounded by a high sandstone wall. There are entrances from the various roads, with the main entrances guarded by lodges. These originally gave accommodation for the gardeners, and continued to do so when it became a public park, but are now in private hands. The mansion house has also disappeared and there is private housing on the site.

The park lies within Woolton conservation area contains a number of listed features.

== Features ==
Features include:

- A Ha-ha
- A Walled garden
- A Topiary garden (only one of its kind in the city)
- A Sunken garden
- An Arboretum (still in formation)
- A Wild flower meadow
- A Quarry (closed to public but available for biological research)
- Woodland areas

== Awards ==
- 2001 won Public Landscape award
- 2002 Green Flag Award status
- 2004 won BALI Landscape award
