= Woolton Woods and Camp Hill =

Public park in Liverpool, England

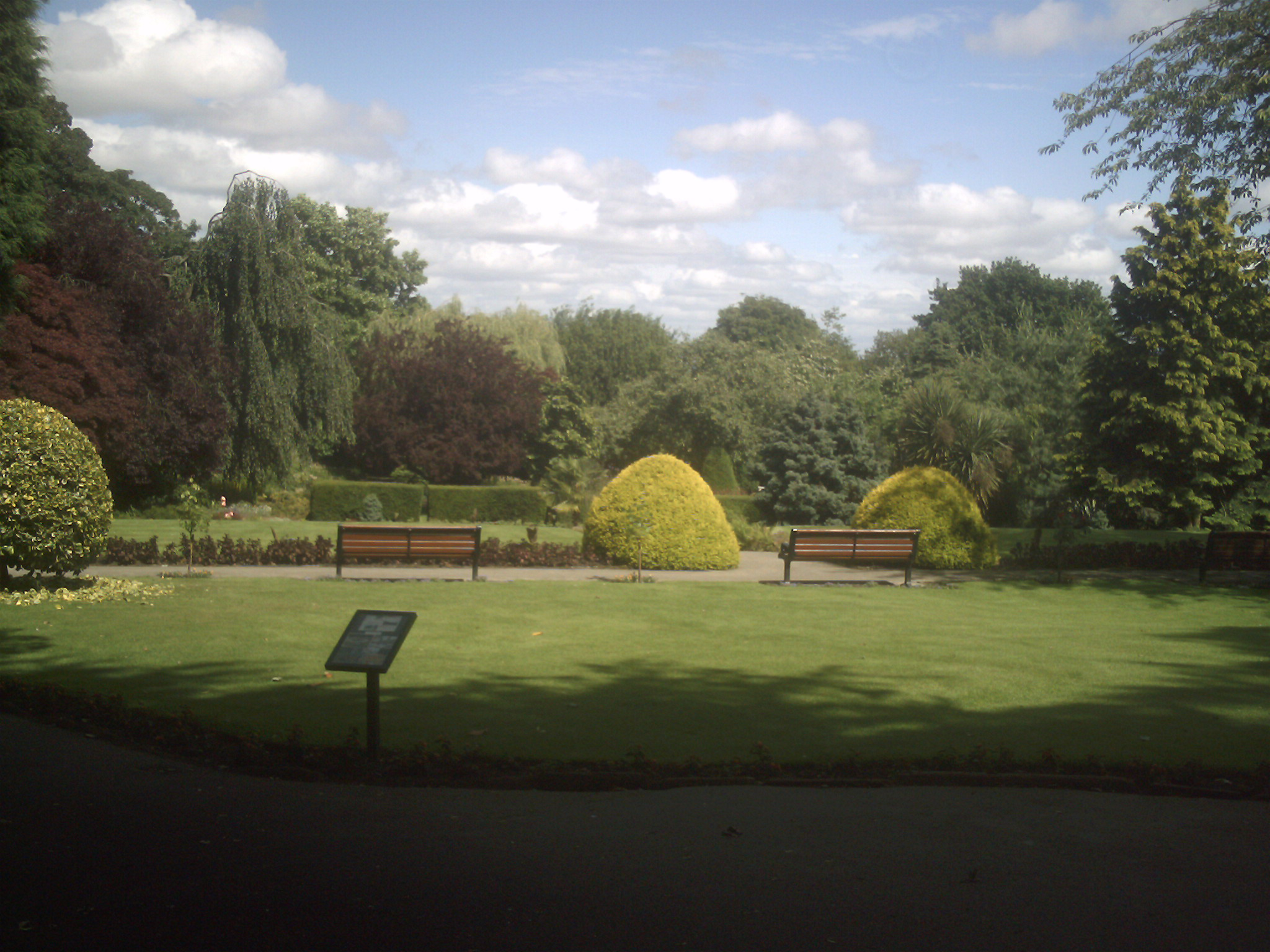
- The walled garden in Woolton Woods
- Interactive map of Woolton Woods and Camp Hill
- Type: Public
- Location: Liverpool, England
- Coordinates: 53.369188°N 2.869257°W
- Area: 30 hectares
- Created: 1920
- Operator: Liverpool City Council
- Status: Open

Woolton Woods and Camp Hill is a wooded park in the Woolton suburb of Liverpool, England.

== Overview ==
Woolton Woods and Camp Hill is adjacent to St Julie's Catholic High School. From 150 BC, an Iron Age fort occupied the crest of Camp Hill. The name of Woolton (recorded in the Domesday Book as Uluentune) is derived from "Wulfa's Tun", from the Anglo-Saxon personal name "Wulfa" and the Old English "tun" meaning "village, farm, or homestead".

Woolton Woods formed part of the estate of Woolton Hall, which was owned by Liverpool's prominent Ashton family from 1772. In the 1850s, ownership of the estate passed to William Shand, who married one of the daughters of Henry Ashton. By 1871, the Gaskell family, whose family tree can be traced back to the 16th century, was resident at Woolton Hall. The site was acquired by Liverpool City Council in the 1920s, and several garden features have since been created and acquired.

The floral clock in the old walled garden was presented to the public in 1927 by the family of James Bellhouse Gaskell, in memory of his long connection with Woolton Woods. The Dutch garden of meditation was created in 1928; although the pool and garden ornaments have long since disappeared, the area is still a sheltered and tranquil spot known locally as the Sunken Garden.

== Gallery ==
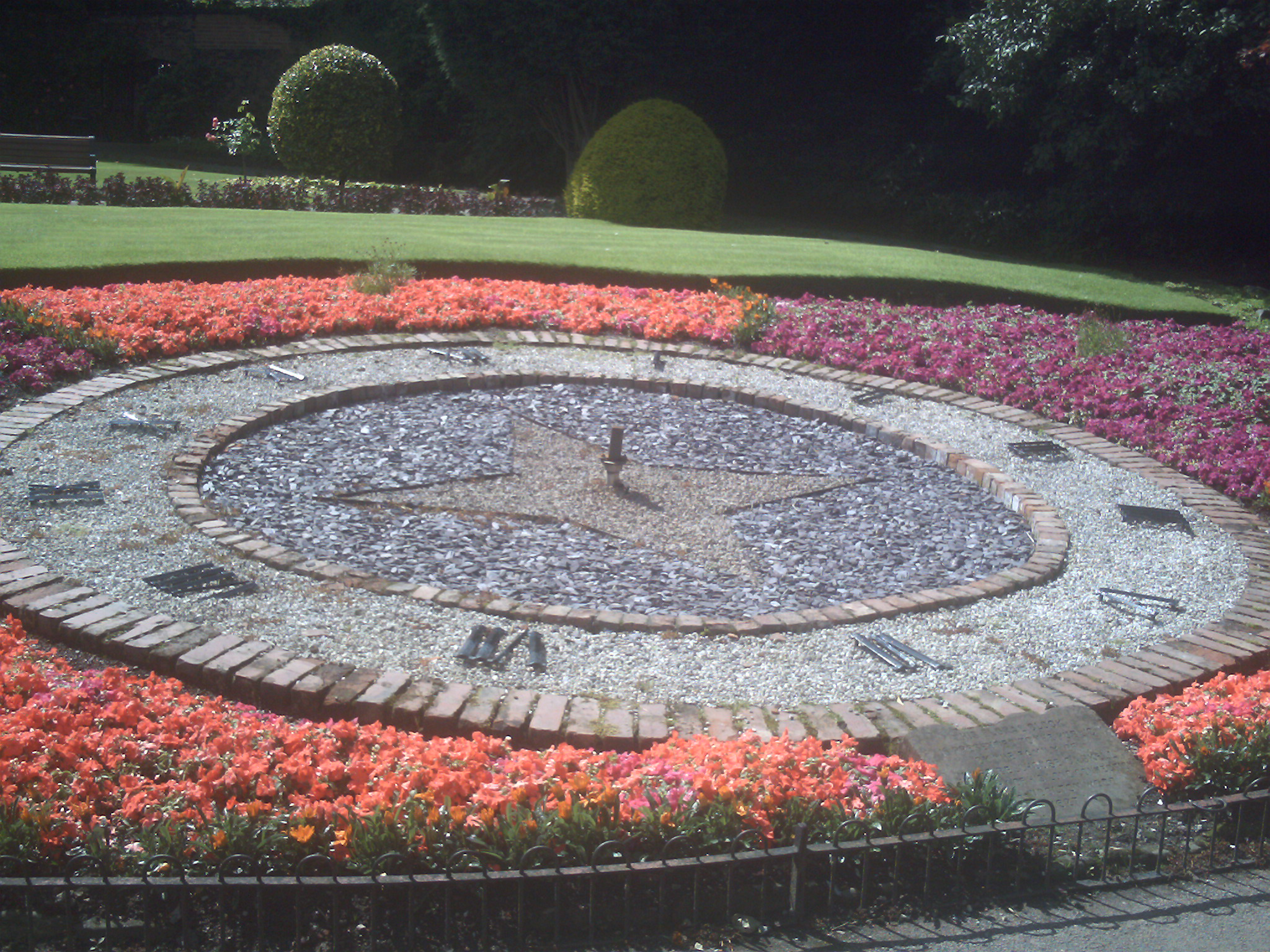
The floral clock in the walled garden

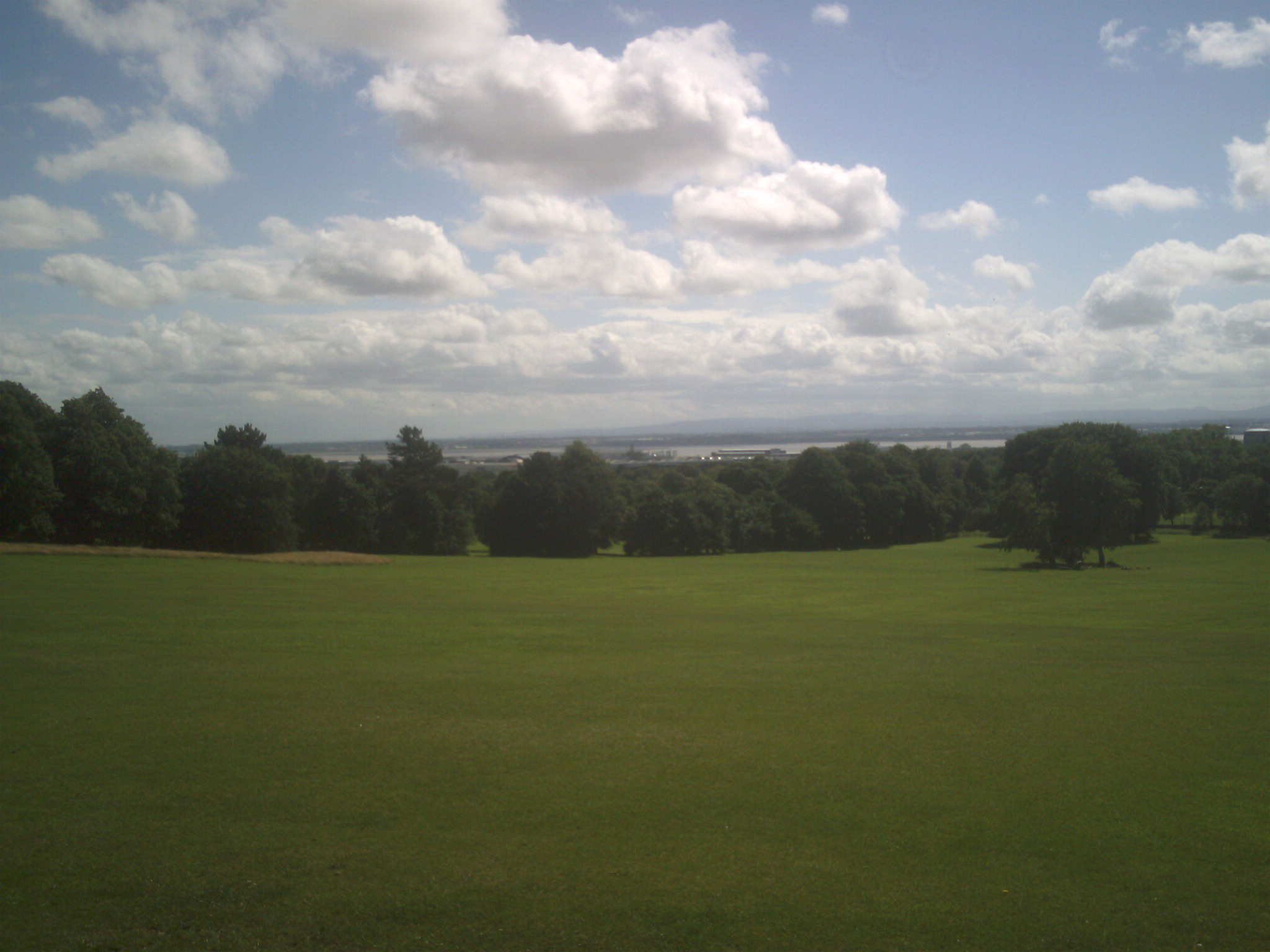
Camp Hill viewed from its summit; the River Mersey and Wales' Moel Famau can be seen in the far background
