= Allerton Junction =

Coordinates: 53.3576°N 2.8877°W

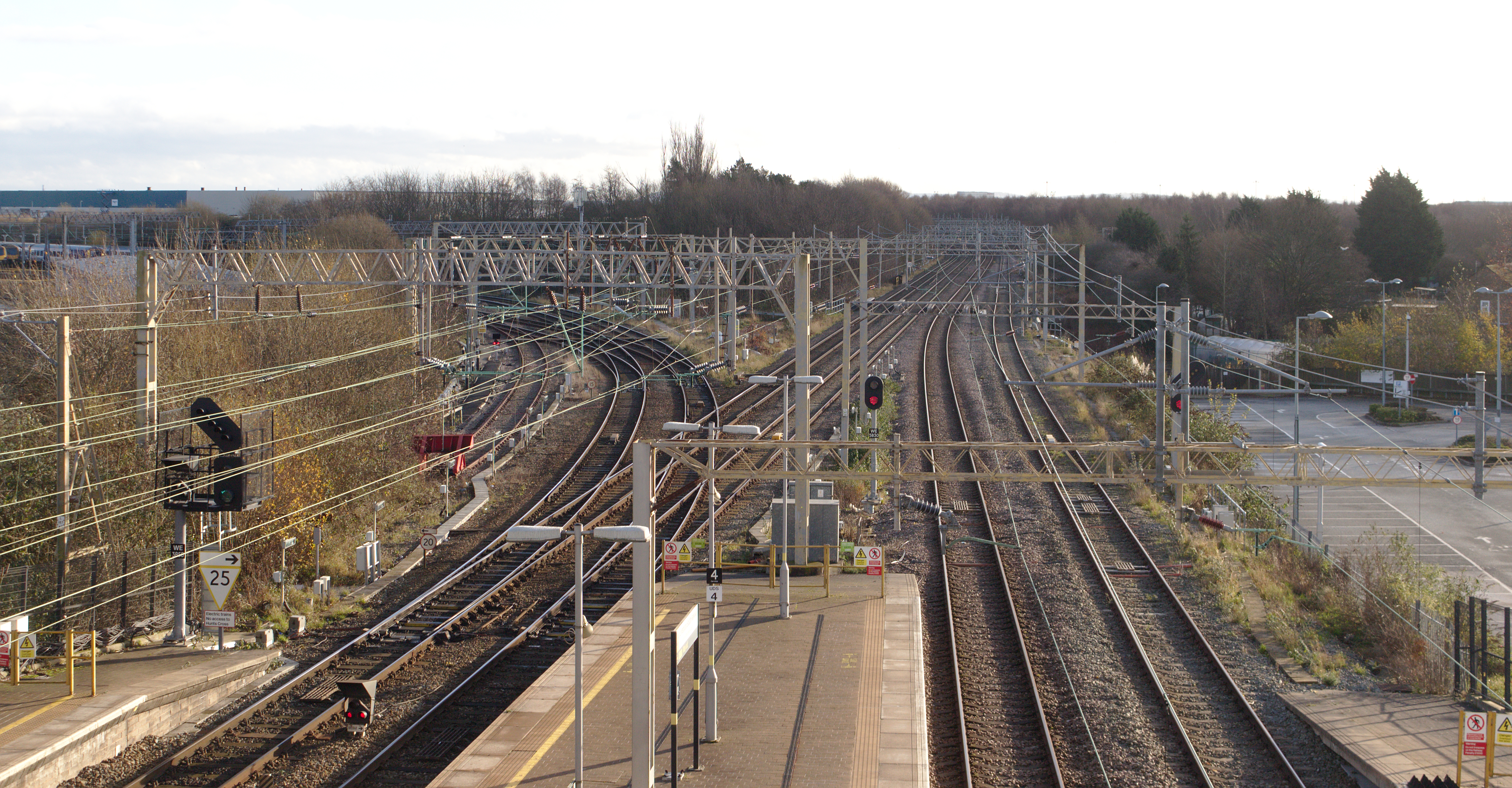
Allerton Junction from footbridge

Allerton Junction is an at grade junction just east of Liverpool South Parkway, Allerton, Merseyside. It takes its name from the former Allerton station that South Parkway replaced.

The junction is where the Liverpool to Manchester line branches off the Liverpool branch of the West Coast Main Line. Services operating over the junction are East Midlands Railway (to Nottingham & Norwich), TransPennine Express (Leeds & Scarborough), West Midlands Trains (Birmingham New Street), Northern (stopping services to Manchester Oxford Road) and Avanti West Coast (London Euston).

== History ==
It has only existed in current form since 1966, as prior to this the former Cheshire Lines Committee (CLC) main line from Manchester Central passed beneath the London & North Western Railway (LNWR) main line and continued on to Liverpool Central High Level. However the 1963 Beeching Report recommended that all mainline rail services into Liverpool be concentrated at the ex-LNWR Liverpool Lime Street station and that the CLC Central High Level station be closed. Accordingly, a new connection to Hunts Cross West Junction (known as the Hunts Cross chord) was built by British Rail in 1965/66 to link the two routes and allow services from the Warrington and Manchester direction to join the LNWR line from Crewe and so reach Liverpool Lime Street. This re-routeing took effect from 5 September 1966 - thereafter the former CLC line west of here was only used by local trains between Central and Gateacre. These were withdrawn in 1972, but the line was later reopened as part of the Merseyrail network in January 1978 as far as Garston and then extended to Hunts Cross in May 1983.

== Operation ==
Though there are two pairs of lines through South Parkway station on the main line, only the fast (eastern) ones are linked to the Hunts Cross route - any on the western (slow) pair must be crossed over to the fast lines north of the station if heading towards Manchester. Allerton Junction signal box (a flat roofed BR standard structure built at the same time as the chord) is located immediately beyond the junction, operating it and the connections into the nearby Allerton TMD.

== See also ==
- Allerton TMD depot
