= Allerton, Liverpool =

Suburb of Liverpool, in Merseyside, England

Coordinates: 53.3685°N 2.8934°W

Allerton
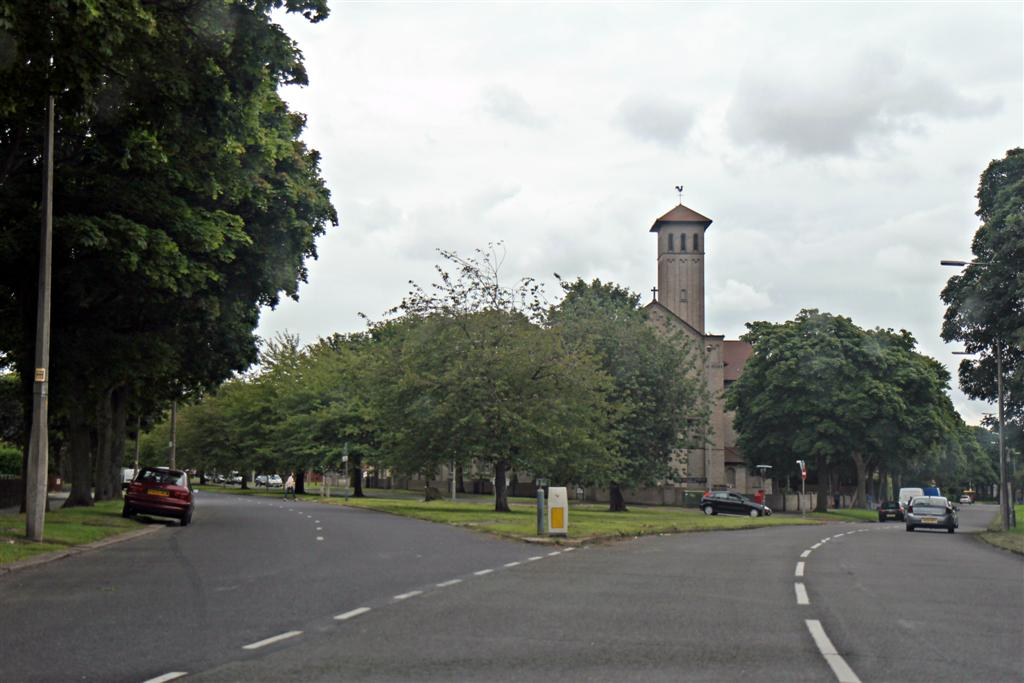
- All Souls Church, Mather Avenue

- Location within Merseyside
- Population: 14,853 (2011)
- OS grid reference: SJ415865
- Metropolitan borough: Liverpool
- Metropolitan county: Merseyside
- Region: North West
- Country: England
- Sovereign state: United Kingdom
- Post town: LIVERPOOL
- Postcode district: L18, L19
- Dialling code: 0151
- Police: Merseyside
- Fire: Merseyside
- Ambulance: North West
- UK Parliament: Liverpool Garston

Allerton is a suburb of the city of Liverpool, in the county of Merseyside, England. Historically in Lancashire, it is located 3 mi (5 km) south-east of the city centre and is bordered by the suburbs of Garston, Hunt's Cross, Mossley Hill and Woolton. It has a number of large houses in the prestigious Calderstones Park area, with mainly 1930s semi-detached housing around the shopping area of Allerton Road. It is paired with Hunts Cross to form the Allerton and Hunts Cross city council ward, which had a population of 14,853 at the 2011 census.

== History ==
In the Domesday Book, Allerton appears as Alretune, meaning "the alder enclosure". This was derived from the Old English alr, meaning "alder", and tún, meaning "enclosure or village". Allerton was formerly a township in the parish of Childwall, in 1866 Allerton became a separate civil parish, it was made an urban district by the Local Government Act 1894, and added to the county borough of Liverpool on 9 November 1913.

On 1 April 1922, the parish was abolished and merged with Liverpool. In 1921, the parish had a population of 2070. Over the course of the 2010s, many new bars and restaurants have opened on Allerton Road, increasing its popularity.

== Education ==
- Calderstones School
- New Heys.

== Transport ==
Allerton is served by two railway stations; Northern Trains provide services at both to Liverpool Lime Street, Manchester Piccadilly and Manchester Airport:

- West Allerton
- Liverpool South Parkway lies on the border of Allerton and Garston, with the railway track separating the two suburbs. It also has services to Southport and Hunts Cross on Merseyrail's Northern Line, with Avanti West Coast inter-city services to London Euston. Itreplaced the former Allerton station and the old platforms are still in use here.

The area has regular bus services operated by Arriva Merseyside and Stagecoach Merseyside & South Lancashire; services connect the area with Liverpool city centre, Birkenhead, Bootle, Halewood, Speke, Wavertree and John Lennon Airport.

== Attractions ==
- Allerton Cemetery
- Allerton Hall
- Allerton Park Golf Club
- Allerton Tower Park
- Calderstones Park (formerly the grounds of Calderstones House)
- Clarke Gardens
- The Parish Church of All Hallows.

== Notable people ==
- Peter Adamson, actor
- Saint John Almond, priest
- Jimmy Case, footballer
- Hollie Cavanagh, singer
- Michael Ihiekwe, footballer
- Bill Kenwright, theatre producer
- Paul McCartney, musician and member of the Beatles
- Hugh O'Leary, accountant, husband of former UK Prime Minister Liz Truss
- John Power, musician
- William Roscoe, banker and lawyer.

== In popular culture ==
The Beatles' song "Penny Lane" is set mostly on Allerton Road; the shelter in the middle of the roundabout, the barber shop and possibly the bank mentioned in the song are all located at the junction of Allerton Road, Penny Lane and Smithdown Road.

Allerton is featured in the first episode of the BBC TV drama series Spooks, in which pro-life campaigners detonate a bomb outside the home of a family planning doctor.
