= Wavertree (disambiguation) =

Wavertree may refer to:

- Wavertree, an area of Liverpool, in Merseyside, England
  - Liverpool Wavertree (UK Parliament constituency)
  - Wavertree (ward), a Liverpool City Council Ward within the Liverpool Wavertree Parliamentary constituency
  - Wavertree railway station (disused)
- Wavertree (ship), a historic sailing ship at the South Street Seaport in New York City
