= Mossley Hill railway station =

Railway station in Liverpool, England

Mossley Hill
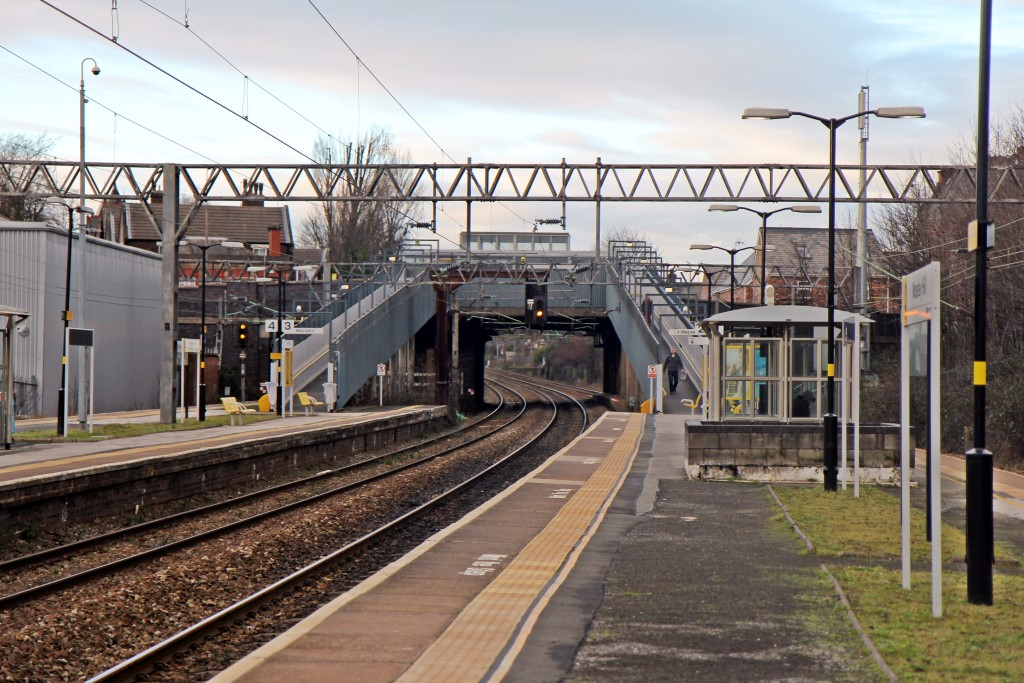

General information
- Location: Mossley Hill, Liverpool; England
- Coordinates: 53.379°N 2.915°W
- Grid reference: SJ392873
- Manager: Northern Trains
- Transit authority: Merseytravel
- Platforms: 4

Other information
- Station code: MSH
- Fare zone: C1
- Classification: DfT category E

Passengers
- 2021/22: ▲0.143 million
- 2022/23: ▲0.166 million
- 2023/24: ▲0.183 million
- 2024/25: ▲0.199 million
- 2025/26: ▲0.260 million
Location
Notes
- Passenger statistics from the Office of Rail and Road

Mossley Hill railway station is in the suburbs of Liverpool in the north west of England. The station is operated by Northern Trains.

== History ==
It and Allerton were the only stations opened on 15 February 1864 when the St Helens Railway's (taken over by the London & North Western Railway from 29 July 1864) extension from Speke to Edge Hill opened. The station was replaced from 13 July 1891, when the Edge Hill to Speke line was quadrupled.

The station was renamed from Mossley Hill for Aigburth to Mossley Hill on 6 May 1974.

North of the station, on the route towards Edge Hill are the sites – still identifiable where the line crosses roads – of the former Sefton Park and Wavertree stations.

== Facilities ==
The ticket office is on a road bridge and (as is standard practice for Merseytravel-sponsored stations) is staffed throughout the hours of service all week, with additional ticket machines on the platforms. Ramps lead down to the two island platforms, which have basic shelters and seats. Passenger information screens, automated announcements and customer help points are also provided to offer train running information.

Like West Allerton (preceding south) there are 4 platforms, 2 of which, platforms 1 and 2, are located on the fast lines and are where most trains stop. 3 & 4 are on the slow lines and are used less frequently, where faster services operated by Avanti West Coast, TransPennine Express and London Northwestern Railway, are booked to overtake stopping services on this stretch of line (this is most common in the Liverpool-bound direction, where it happens hourly on platform 4).

== Services ==
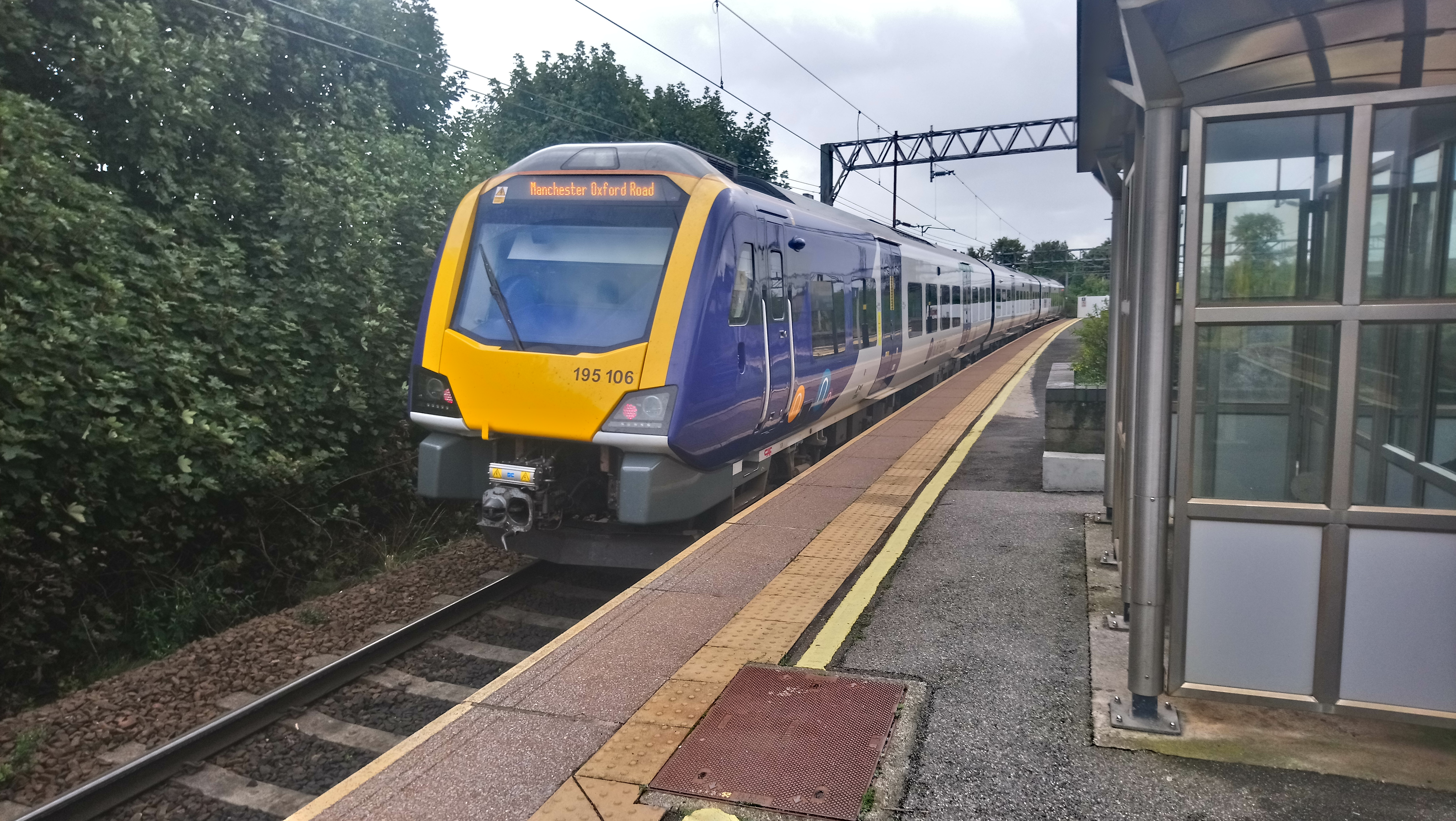
A Northern class 195 at Mossley Hill bound for Manchester Oxford Road

The station is currently served by local stopping trains between Liverpool Lime Street and Warrington Central operated by Northern Trains. These call every half-hour in each direction on Mondays to Saturdays during the day, with alternate services continuing through to Manchester Oxford Road. These are limited stop to Warrington, whilst the one that terminates there calls at most local stations en-route. The frequency drops to hourly in the evening and on Sundays.

As of the December 2024 timetable change, hourly London Northwestern Railway services to Crewe and Birmingham New Street, as well as their counterparts to Liverpool Lime Street, were reintroduced, removing the need to change at Liverpool South Parkway.

Preceding station	National Rail	Following station
Edge Hill	Northern Trains; Liverpool to Manchester Line (south)	West Allerton
Liverpool Lime Street Terminus	London Northwestern Railway Birmingham–Liverpool	Liverpool South Parkway towards Birmingham New Street
Historical railways
Sefton Park; Line open, station closed	London and North Western Railway; St Helens and Runcorn Gap Railway	West Allerton; Line and station open
	Disused railways	
Edge Lane	Canada Dock Branch; Olive Mount chord	Terminus

The station is also served by several local bus routes.
