= West Allerton railway station =

Railway station in Liverpool, England

West Allerton
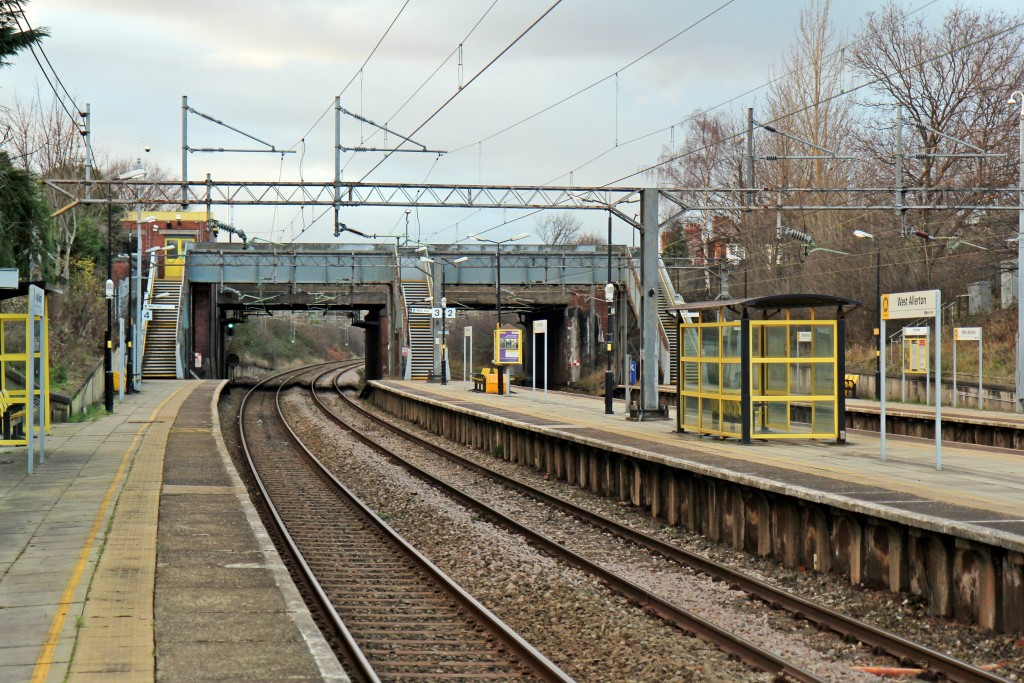

General information
- Location: Allerton, Liverpool; England
- Coordinates: 53.3696°N 2.9075°W
- Grid reference: SJ397862
- Manager: Northern Trains
- Transit authority: Merseyside
- Platforms: 4

Other information
- Station code: WSA
- Fare zone: C1
- Classification: DfT category E

Passengers
- 2021/22: ▲46,980
- 2022/23: ▲62,970
- 2023/24: ▼60,878
- 2024/25: ▲61,846
- 2025/26: ▲73,834
Location
Notes
- Passenger statistics from the Office of Rail and Road

West Allerton railway station serves the suburb of Allerton, Liverpool in the north west of England. The station, and all trains serving it, are operated by Northern Trains and it is situated 4 1/4 miles (6.8 km) southeast of Liverpool Lime Street on the main line to Runcorn and Crewe.

== History ==
The station opened on 2 January 1939. Allerton station was to the south, but it closed in 2005 to make way for Liverpool South Parkway which opened the following year.

== Facilities ==
There are four platforms, two of which, platforms 1 and 2, are located on the fast lines and are where most trains stop. Platforms 3 and 4 are on the slow lines and are used infrequently, mainly where faster services are booked to overtake stopping services on this stretch of line (This is most common in the Liverpool-bound direction). The platform layout consists of three structures:

- Platform 1 - single faced, on the Up Fast line.
- Platform 2-3 - double faced, between the Down Fast line & Up Slow lines.
- Platform 4 - single faced, on the Down Slow line.

All platforms have a basic glass and metal shelter approximately halfway along; the central island platform (2–3) is fully enclosed, whereas the outer platforms have single sided ones. Help points are provided for emergency use and for train running information (there is also a P.A system in place to provide automated service announcements). In 2020 the station had new dot-matrix public information screens installed inside the glass shelter areas along the platforms.

The station building on the over bridge has a staffed booking office that is open during hours when trains are serving the station, this is operated by Northern Trains though sponsored by Merseytravel. There is no step-free access to the platforms, as the footbridge from the ticket office to platform level has stairs.

== Services ==
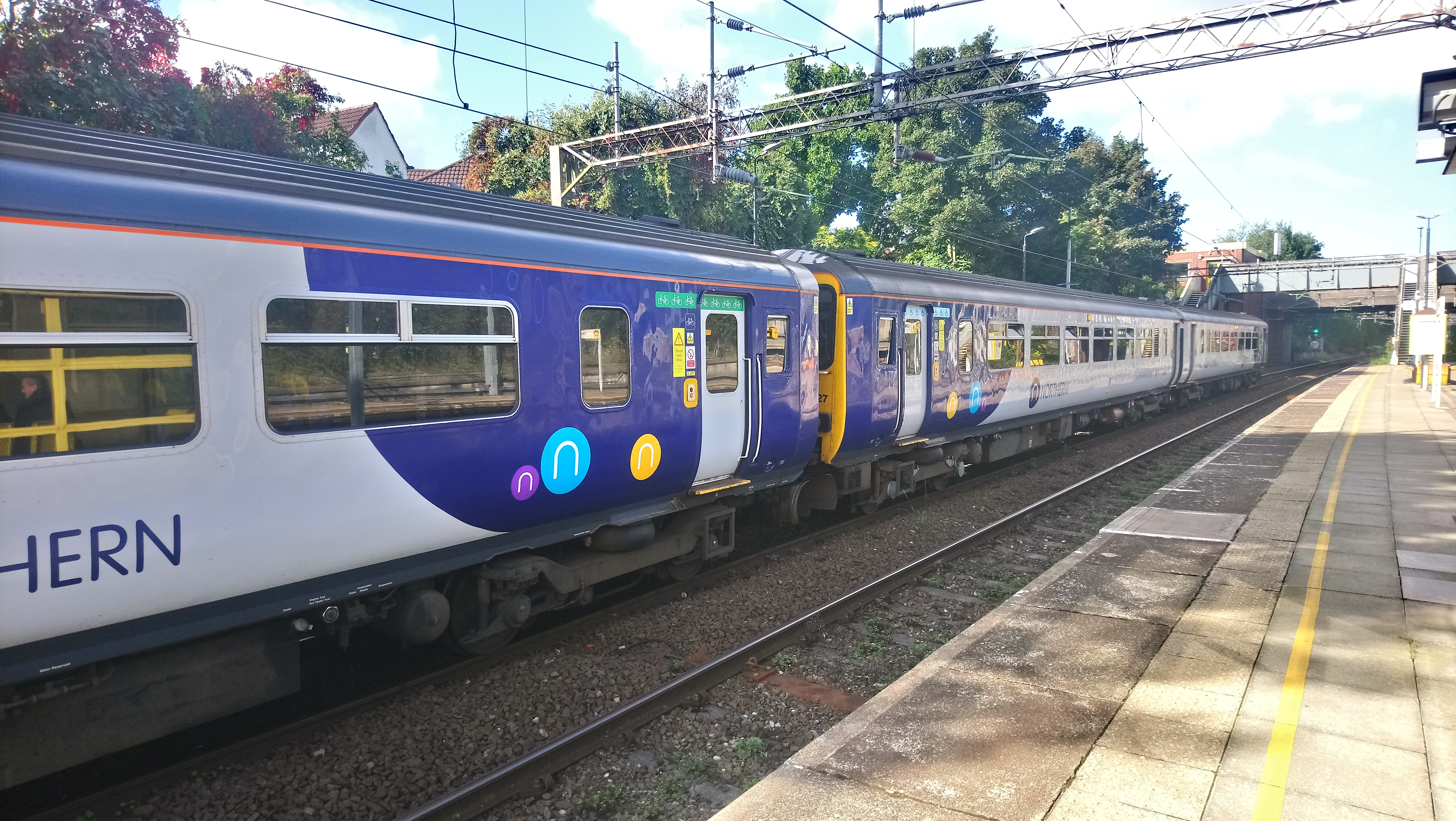
A pairing of Northern class 156 units at West Allerton on a service from Manchester Oxford Road to Liverpool Lime Street.

Services are roughly half-hourly in each direction, towards Mossley Hill and Liverpool Lime Street to the west and towards Liverpool South Parkway and Warrington Central in the east. This consists of two trains per hour to Warrington Central (one of which is extended through to Manchester Oxford Road) and westbound to Liverpool Lime Street, all operated by Northern Trains.

The stopping pattern varies between departures, with the Warrington Central train serving most local stops, whilst the Manchester train is limited stop to Warrington, but serves most stations thereafter. In the evenings and on Sundays the frequency is hourly in each direction.

| Preceding station | National Rail | Following station |
|---|---|---|
| Mossley Hill | Northern Trains; Liverpool to Manchester Line (south) | Liverpool South Parkway |
