= Sefton Park railway station =

Former railway station in England

Sefton Park

General information
- Location: Wavertree, Liverpool; England
- Coordinates: 53.3896°N 2.9239°W
- Grid reference: SJ385885
- Platforms: 4

Other information
- Status: Disused

History
- Original company: London and North Western Railway
- Pre-grouping: London and North Western Railway
- Post-grouping: London, Midland and Scottish Railway

Key dates
- 1 June 1892: Opened
- 2 May 1960: Closed
Location

Sefton Park railway station is a disused station in Liverpool, England.

== History ==
The station opened on 1 June 1892. This followed the quadrupling of the line from Wavertree to Ditton Junction on 13 July 1891. The station had a substantial booking office at street level on the west side of the line and on the south side of Smithdown Road. A subway connected to four platforms situated on an embankment well above street level. The platforms had waiting facilities constructed of timber. The station came under the control of the station master at Mossley Hill and was staffed by a junior clerk and two porters. The station closed on 2 May 1960 shortly before the line was electrified due to low passenger numbers. Reports suggested that the station was losing £2,000 a year with an average of just 80 tickets a day being issued.

Nothing remains at track level but at street level the booking office can still be seen as it is in use as a paint shop.

There have been proposals to reopen the station, or create a new station further up the line on the bridge at Penny Lane, as the density of immediate population could support a station.

The station was listed for potential reopening under the name Greenbank Park or Penny Lane in the 2006-2011 Merseyside Local Transport Plan. It was again referenced as "Smithdown Road Station" in the 2018 Liverpool City Region Combined Authority Rail Strategy, where it was described as a potential "short term" reopening project with a business case that "performed well". Despite this, there remain no firm plans at present for the station to reopen.

Preceding station	Historical railways	Following station
Wavertree; Line open, station closed	London and North Western Railway; St Helens and Runcorn Gap Railway	Mossley Hill; Line and station open
