= Allerton railway station =

Former railway station in England

Coordinates: 53.35855°N 2.89096°W

Allerton

General information
- Location: Garston, Liverpool; England
- Grid reference: SJ408849
- Platforms: 2

Other information
- Status: Disused

History
- Original company: St Helens and Runcorn Gap Railway
- Pre-grouping: London and North Western Railway
- Post-grouping: London Midland and Scottish Railway

Key dates
- 15 February 1864: Opened as Allerton
- Unknown: Renamed Allerton for Garston and Woolton
- 6 May 1974: Renamed Allerton
- 30 July 2005: Closed
- 11 June 2006: Reopened as Liverpool South Parkway

Passengers
- 2004/05: 0.011 million
Location
Notes
- Passenger statistics from the Office of Rail and Road

Allerton railway station was a railway station on the City Line of the Merseyrail network, located in the suburbs of Liverpool, England.

== History ==
It opened on 15 February 1864 with the opening of the St Helens and Runcorn Gap Railway's extension to Edge Hill.

Despite the name, it was not located in the suburb of Allerton, but in neighbouring Garston. The station was located at the Allerton Junction of the routes from Liverpool to Manchester and Crewe.

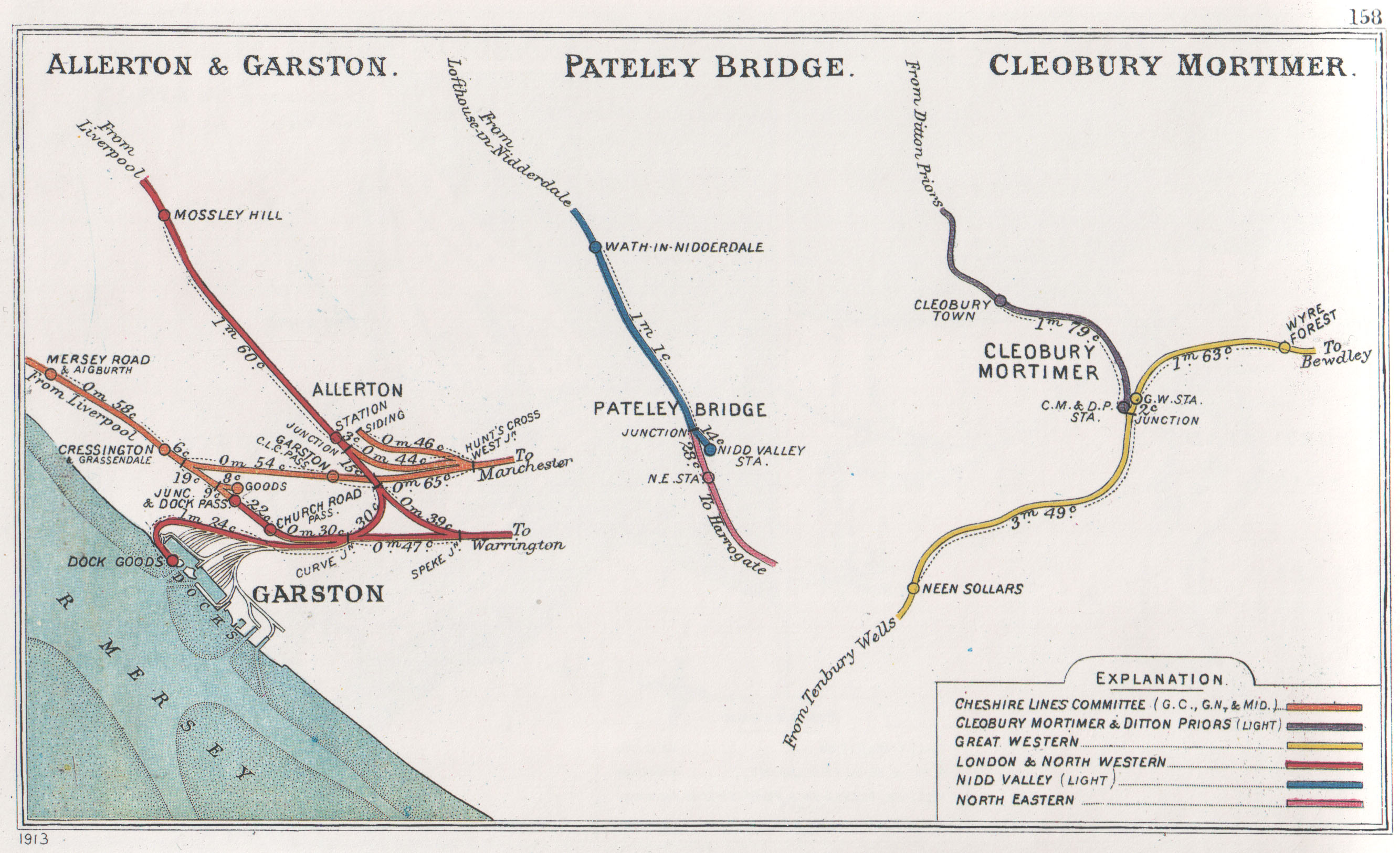
A 1913 Railway Clearing House map (left) of railways in the vicinity of Allerton

Prior to closure, the station was served by the hourly Liverpool Lime Street to Manchester Oxford Road service. A stopping service to Crewe was withdrawn in the early 1990s.

Allerton lost much of its traffic in 1978 when the nearby Garston station reopened on Merseyrail's Northern Line, offering a faster, more frequent service to Liverpool Central.

Despite the low passenger numbers, the station retained a staffed booking office in accordance with the policy of the local PTE, Merseytravel.

=== Closure ===
The station closed to passengers on 30 July 2005 and underwent a complete rebuild, reopening on 11 June 2006 as Liverpool South Parkway. The original station buildings were demolished and the subway linking the platforms, located at the Liverpool end of the station, was filled in. A new, modern structure of glass and steel was built, with a footbridge over the platforms at the south end of the station.

| Preceding station | National Rail | Following station |
|---|---|---|
| Hunts Cross | Northern Trains; Liverpool to Manchester Line (Station replaced by Liverpool South Parkway) | West Allerton |
| | Historical railways | |
| Speke; Line open, station closed | LNWR | West Allerton; Line and station open |
| | Disused railways | |
| Church Road Garston; Line and station closed | LNWR; St Helens and Runcorn Gap Railway | West Allerton; Line and station open |

== See also ==
- Allerton Junction
- Allerton TMD depot
