= Allerton TMD =

Railway depot in Allerton, England

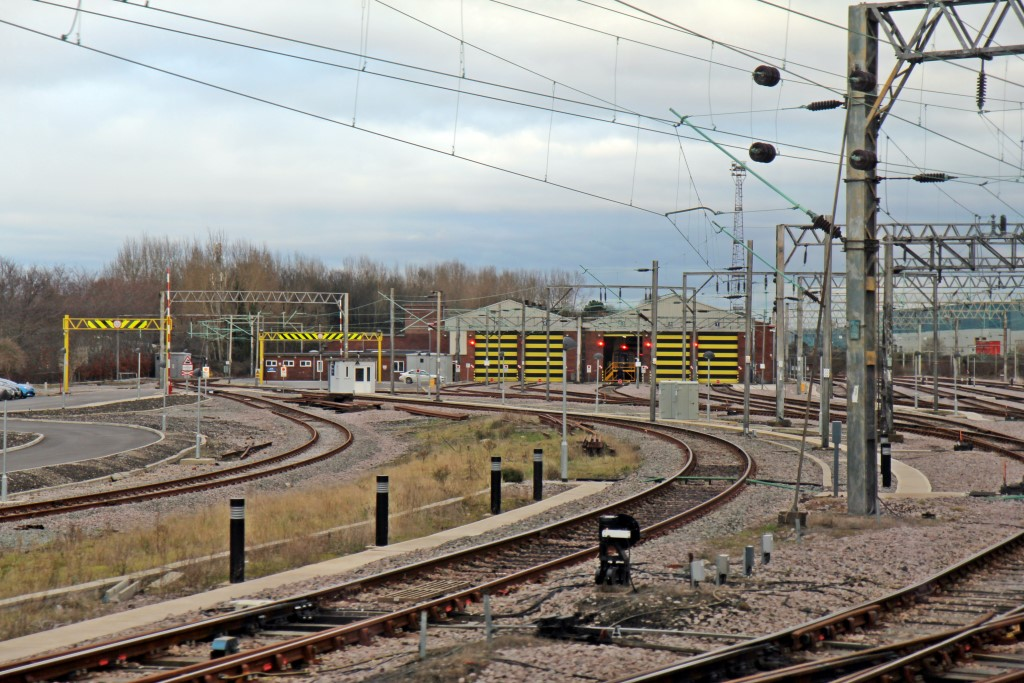
- Allerton TMD, seen from the line between Liverpool South Parkway and Hunts Cross
- Interactive map of Allerton TMD

Location
- Location: Liverpool, Merseyside
- Coordinates: 53.3578°N 2.8814°W
- OS grid: SJ413849

Characteristics
- Owner: Network Rail
- Depot code: AN (1973–)
- Type: DMU and EMU
- Rolling stock: Class 195; Class 319; Class 323; Class 331; Class 769

History
- Former depot code: 8H (1960–63); 8J (1963–73)

Allerton TMD is a railway depot situated in Allerton, Liverpool. Situated opposite Liverpool South Parkway bus and rail interchange, it is visible from trains which are travelling between the former and Hunts Cross and the overhead passageway above platforms 1 to 4 at Liverpool South Parkway. The depot is located less than 2 km (1.2 mi) from the Freightliner intermodal terminal at Garston Docks and is also 7 km (4.3 mi) from the Stobart Rail intermodal depot in Widnes.

During the days of steam locomotive operation, the shed code was 8H between 1960 and 1963 and 8J between 1963 and 1973. Since 1973, when TOPS was introduced, Allerton's depot code has been AN.

== History ==
During the British Rail era, Allerton depot was responsible for maintaining all of the main line and shunting locomotives which were operating in the Liverpool area, having an allocation of Class 08 diesel shunters and a wheel lathe.

== Users ==
=== Merseyrail ===
Until 2006, when a new wheel lathe was installed at Merseyrail's Kirkdale depot, Merseyrail's Class 507 and 508 electric multiple units were regularly sent to Allerton for wheel turning, being transferred via the crossover at Hunts Cross. Other units, including Virgin CrossCountry's Class 220 and 221 diesel electric multiple units (servicing only) and goods wagons and locomotives, have previously been stabled here.

=== Northern Rail ===
From March 2011 until 31 March 2016, the depot was operated by Northern Rail.

In 2011, it was announced that Network Rail had purchased the then closed Allerton TMD with the intention of refurbishing and reopening the depot for servicing of Northern Rail's fleet of Class 156 diesel multiple units and the planned allocation of Class 319 units, which were to cascade to Northern Rail for planned electrified services. Previously owned by the English Welsh and Scottish Railway, Allerton TMD re-opened on 10 December 2011. The first Class 319 units entered traffic in March 2015 with the completion of the first phase of the North West Electrification programme.

=== Arriva Rail North ===
On 1 April 2016, when the new Northern franchise period commenced, operation of Allerton transferred to Arriva Rail North. The depot retained its allocation of 29 Class 156 DMUs and twenty Class 319/3 EMUs, with an additional twelve Class 319s being allocated to the depot during 2017. Whilst not on the depot's allocation, Class 150 units are stabled here overnight on weeknights after completing a Manchester Victoria to Liverpool Lime Street service.

Allerton's allocation of Class 156 units transferred to Newton Heath in 2018.

=== Northern Trains ===
On 1 March 2020 the Northern franchise was taken over by Northern Trains as an Operator of Last Resort by the Department for Transport and the operation of Allerton transferred to Northern Trains.

Allerton is allocated Class 195, Class 323, Class 331 and Class 769 units.
