= Penny Lane, Liverpool =

Street in Liverpool, England

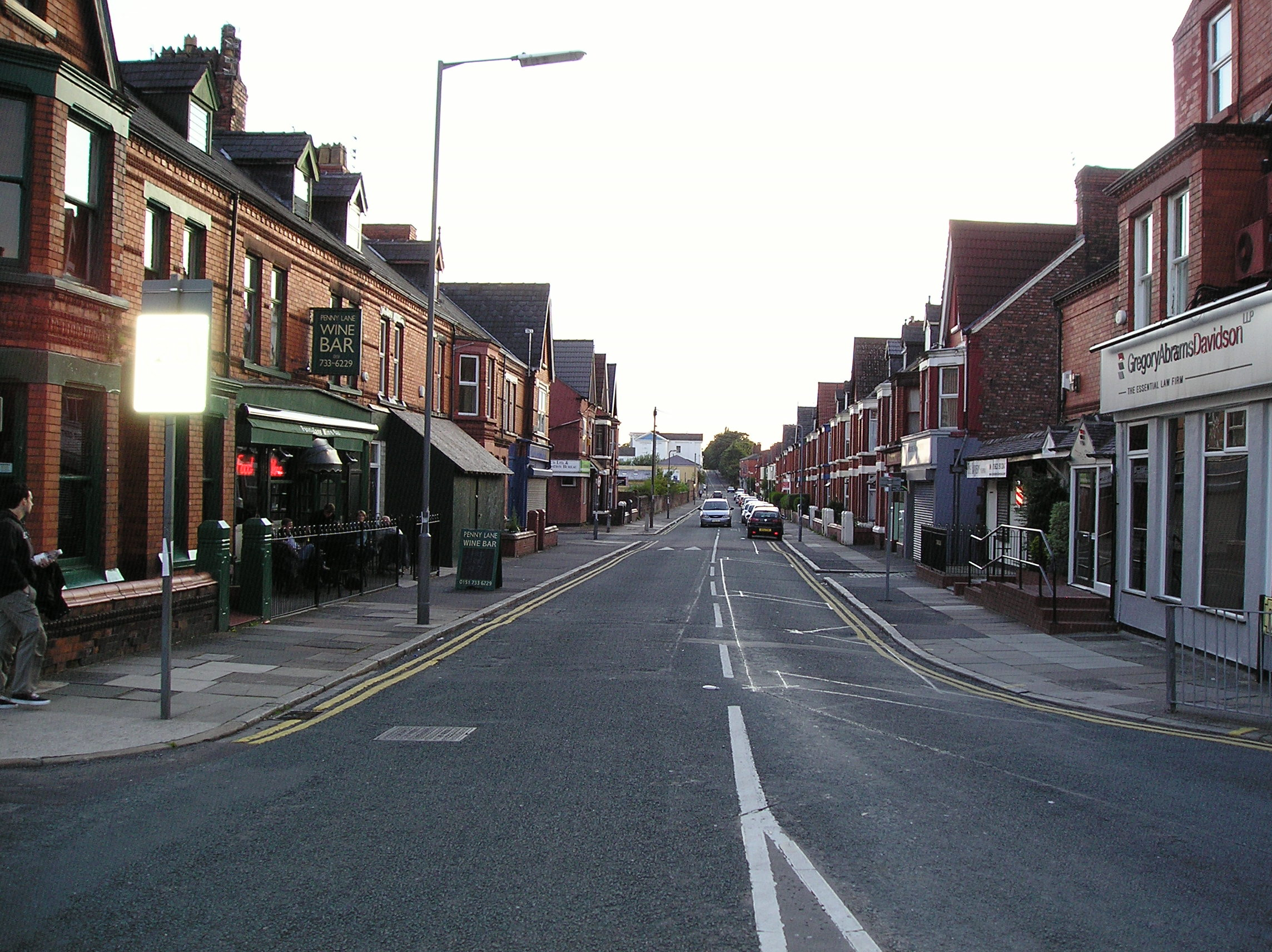
- Penny Lane, Liverpool

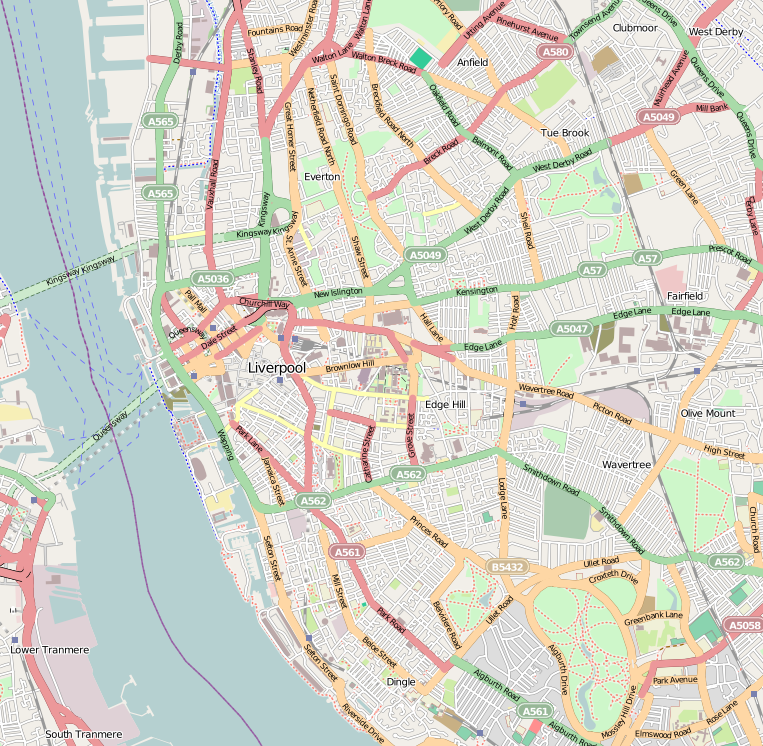
- Location within Liverpool
- Length: Approx 800 metres 50.05º from north
- Location: Mossley Hill, Liverpool
- Postal code: L18
- Nearest metro station: Mossley Hill station
- Coordinates: 53°23′13″N 2°55′10″W

Other
- Known for: The Beatles, bars, bistros, food outlets

Penny Lane is a street situated south off the A562 road in the Mossley Hill suburb of Liverpool, England. The name also applies to the area surrounding the thoroughfare. During the 20th century, it was the location for one of the main bus terminals in Liverpool, and gained international notability in 1967 when the Beatles released their song "Penny Lane" in tribute to their upbringing in Liverpool.

== History ==
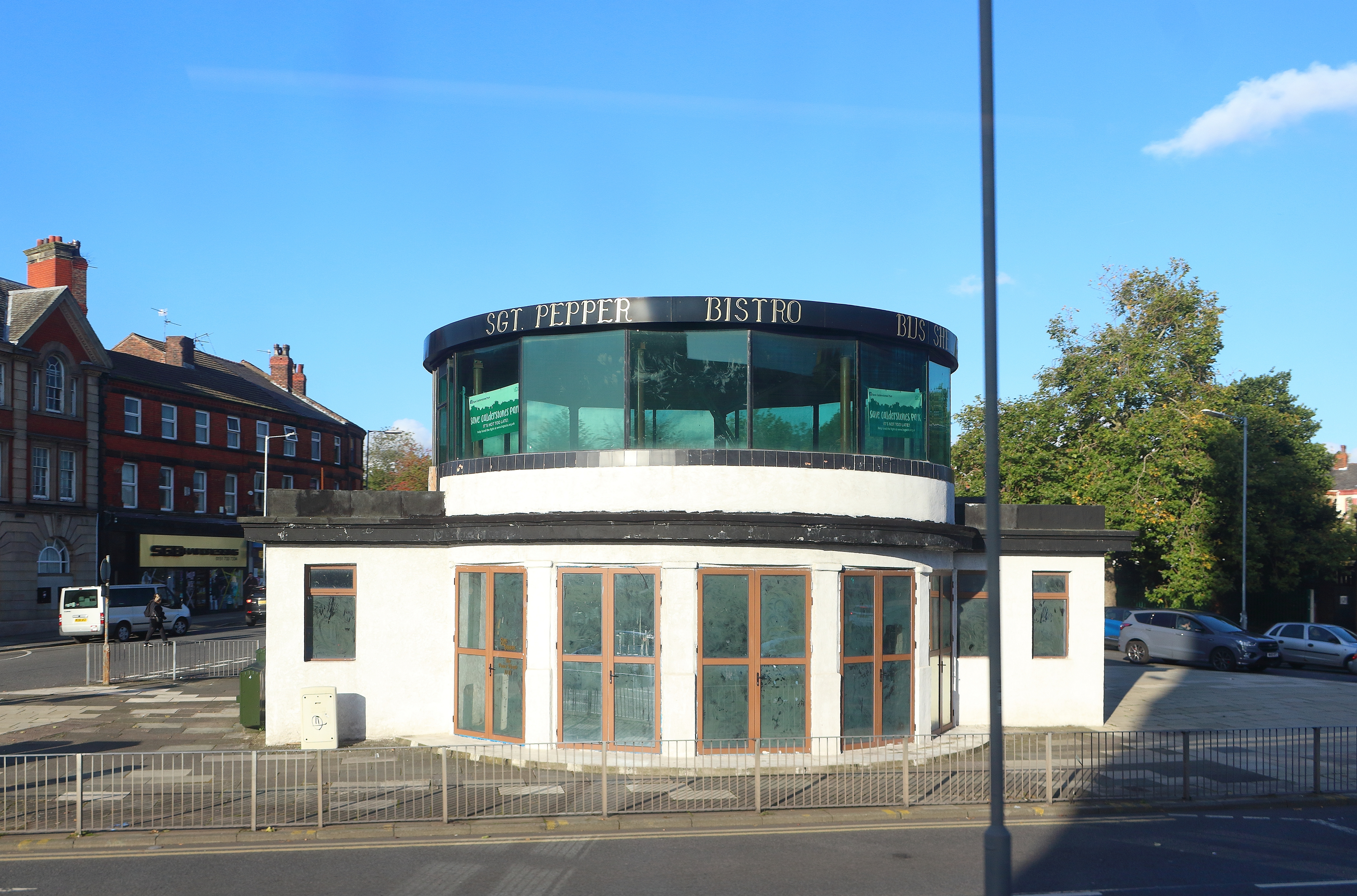
The "shelter in the middle of the roundabout" mentioned in the Beatles song, now extended upwards and converted into a bistro

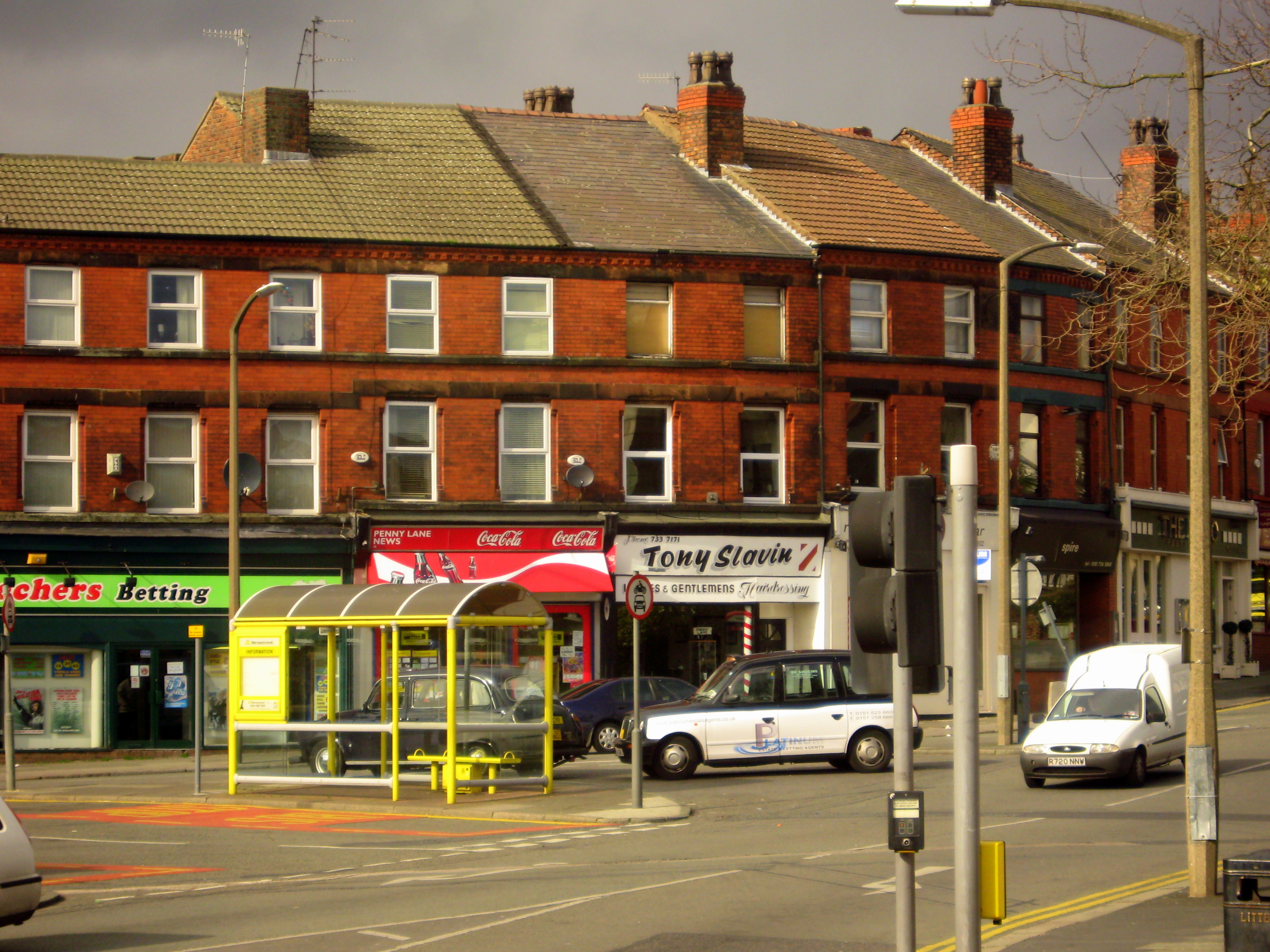
Tony Slavin now occupies the location of the Bioletti's barbershop mentioned in the Beatles song.

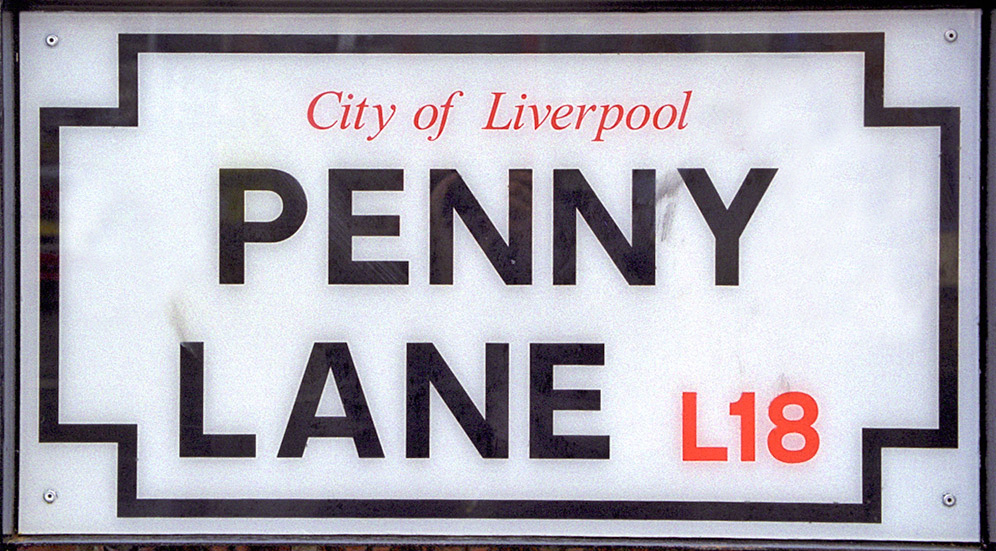
Penny Lane street sign

Penny Lane appears as an unnamed laneway on maps as early as the 1700s and remained a rural thoroughfare until the 1890s. After the city's expansion, it was the location for a significant tram and bus terminus for several routes, and buses with "Penny Lane" displayed were common throughout Liverpool. The name is also used for the area that surrounds its junction with Smithdown Road, Smithdown Place (where the terminus was located), and Allerton Road, the last of which includes a busy shopping area. It was the terminus for the number 46 and 99 bus routes to Walton, Old Swan and the city centre. At the other end from its junction on Smithdown Road, the street leads down to the University of Liverpool's student halls of residence near Sefton Park. The total length is some 800 metres, with a gradient of less than 0.4%.

The street and bus depot became a place of international interest as a result of the Beatles' song "Penny Lane", which was released in February 1967 and was a No. 1 hit around the world. The fireman and fire engine mentioned in the lyrics are the fire station at Mather Avenue, which is close to Penny Lane. The terminus at Penny Lane included a purpose-built bus shelter, with a waiting room and toilets. The shelter is located on its own island, which is "the shelter in the middle of a roundabout" referred to in the song.

Towards the end of the 1970s, businesses in Penny Lane included Penny Lane Records and a wine bar known as Harper's Bizarre, now called Penny Lane Wine Bar. The latter was formerly a doctors' surgery operated by doctors Walton, Endbinder, and Partners, which moved to Smithdown Place in the 1980s. Following the privatisation of UK buses, the Merseyside Passenger Transport Executive bus depot was demolished and replaced with a shopping precinct, supermarket, and pub. In the 1980s, the bus shelter was bought privately and converted to Sgt. Pepper's Bistro. It subsequently closed and remained out of commission until 2015, when it underwent refurbishment with the aim of reopening as a restaurant, although it remains unopened as of March 2023.

The street has long been sought out by Beatles fans touring Liverpool. In the past, Penny Lane street signs were constant targets of street sign theft and had to be continually replaced, but city officials gave up and simply began painting the street name on the sides of buildings and walls. That practice was stopped in 2007, four decades after the release of the song, and more theft-resistant street signs were installed, but some are still stolen by tourists. The Penny Lane area has acquired a level of trendiness and desirability since the late 2000s, and is now one of the most sought-after areas among Liverpool's large student population for its wholefood outlets, charity shops, cafés, bars, bistros, takeaway food emporiums, pubs, and selection of traditional businesses such as WHSmith.

On 29 November 2023, a Penny Lane sign stolen by a group of drunk students in 1976 was returned to the city of Liverpool after 47 years, making it the oldest one to be returned. The sign is now on display in The Beatles Story museum on the Royal Albert Dock.

== Naming controversy ==
In July 2006, Liverpool City Council discussed renaming certain streets because their names were linked to Liverpool's role in the slave trade. It was initially believed that the street was named after 18th-century Liverpool slave trader James Penny. Officials said they would modify the proposal to exclude Penny Lane as it was generally accepted that most people associate the street with the Beatles song rather than the slave trade.

In the wake of the June 2020 George Floyd protests, which formed part of the international Black Lives Matter movement, Penny Lane's street signs were defaced. Research corroborated by the city's International Slavery Museum subsequently found no historical evidence linking its name to the slave trade.
