= Wavertree railway station =

Former railway station in England

Wavertree

General information
- Location: Wavertree, Liverpool; England
- Coordinates: 53.3967°N 2.9283°W
- Grid reference: SJ382893
- Platforms: 4

Other information
- Status: Disused

History
- Original company: London and North Western Railway
- Post-grouping: London, Midland and Scottish Railway

Key dates
- 1 September 1870: Opened
- 5 August 1958: Closed
Location

Wavertree railway station was a station in Wavertree, Liverpool, England.

== History ==
The station opened on 1 September 1870 by the London and North Western Railway. The line was quadrupled as far as Ditton Junction on 13 July 1891, when the station entrance was moved and the station itself may have been rebuilt. The station had a substantial booking office at street level on the west side of the line and on the south side of Wellington Road. A subway connected to four platforms situated on an embankment well above street level. The platforms had timber-built waiting facilities. The station closed on 5 August 1958 shortly before the line was electrified. No trace of the station remains at track level.

The station was listed for potential reopening in the 2006-2011 Merseyside Local Transport Plan. However it failed to appear in the 2018 Liverpool City Region Combined Authority Rail Strategy document, which continues to list the neighbouring disused Sefton Park station for reopening.

Preceding station	Historical railways	Following station
Edge Hill; Line and station open	London and North Western Railway; St Helens and Runcorn Gap Railway	Sefton Park; Line open, station closed
