= Liverpool South Parkway railway station =

Railway and bus interchange in Merseyside, England

Liverpool South Parkway for Liverpool John Lennon Airport
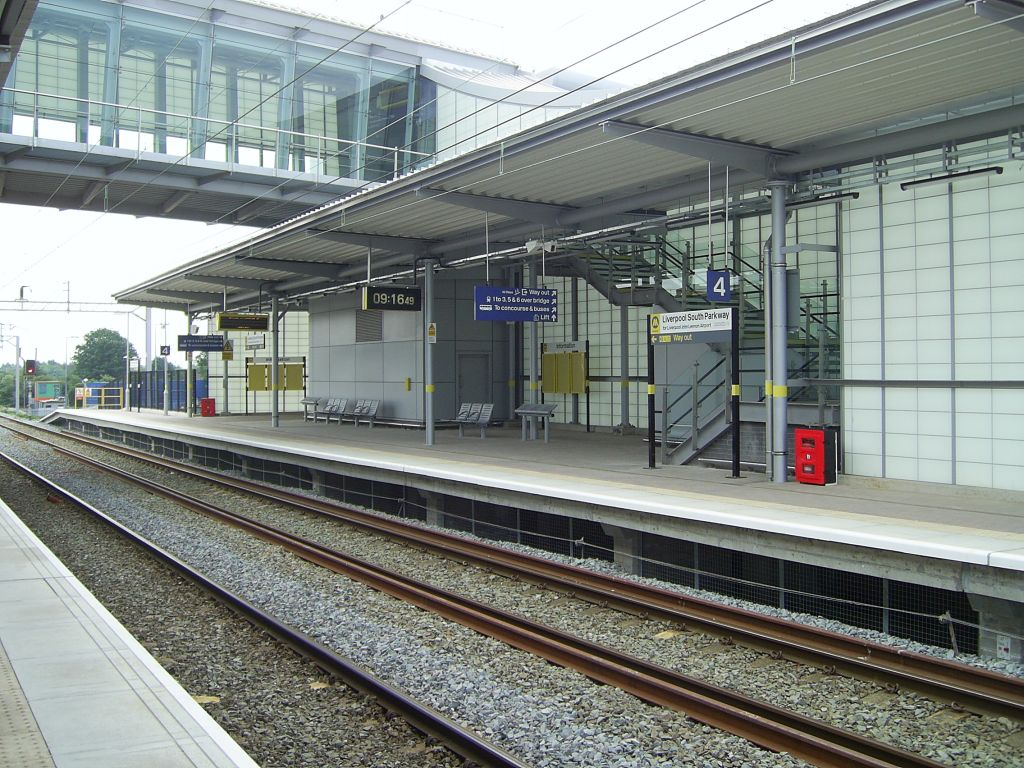

General information
- Location: Garston, Liverpool, England
- Coordinates: 53.3577°N 2.8897°W
- Grid reference: SJ408849
- Manager: Merseyrail
- Transit authority: Merseytravel
- Platforms: 6

Other information
- Station code: LPY
- Fare zone: C1/C2
- Classification: DfT category B

Key dates
- 11 June 2006: Opened

Passengers
- 2021/22: ▲1.460 million
- Interchange: ▲0.856 million
- 2022/23: ▲1.813 million
- Interchange: ▼0.141 million
- 2023/24: ▲2.018 million
- Interchange: ▲0.206 million
- 2024/25: ▲2.164 million
- Interchange: ▲0.232 million
- 2025/26: ▲2.492 million
- Interchange: ▲0.285 million
Location
Notes
- Passenger statistics from the Office of Rail and Road

Liverpool South Parkway is a railway station and bus interchange in the Garston district of Liverpool, in Merseyside, England. With a regular bus link, it serves Liverpool John Lennon Airport in the neighbouring suburb of Speke, as well as providing an interchange between main line services and the Merseyrail network. Opened in 2006 on the site of the former Allerton station, it also replaced nearby Garston.

The station is located towards the southern end of Merseyrail's Northern Line and on the junction of two main lines: the City Line from Liverpool to Manchester via Warrington; and the Liverpool branch of the West Coast Main Line to London, via Crewe.

== History ==
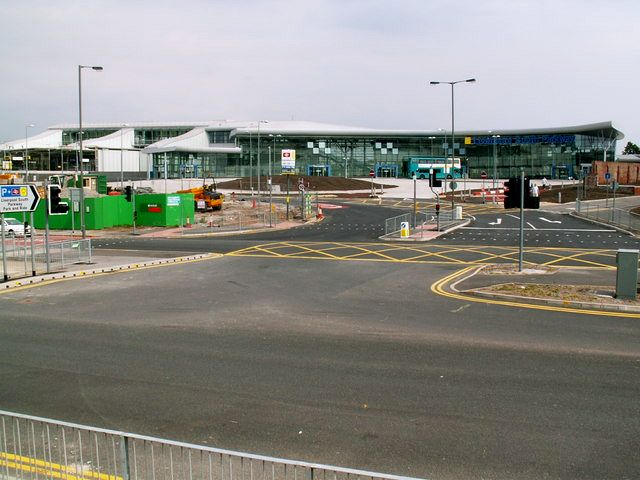
An exterior shot of the interchange during construction

The station was built at a crossing point between two railway lines that had, until then, been served by separate stations. The first was the Cheshire Lines Committee (CLC) line from Liverpool Central to Manchester via Warrington Central, which ran from west to east. The second was the line built by the St Helens Railway from Liverpool Lime Street to Warrington Bank Quay, which crossed from north-west to south-east. The latter route became part of the Liverpool branch of the West Coast Main Line in 1868 when it was connected to a new route from Crewe via the then-new Runcorn Railway Bridge. The original line to Warrington Bank Quay is now closed to passenger trains. The two lines were served by two separate stations in the area, Garston and Allerton respectively. (Note: The latter was also located in Garston.)

The first proposals for an interchange station at Garston were made in the 1960s and 1970s, when the Merseyrail semi-underground network was being planned. At the time, the suggestion was that the new station and Broad Green would be interchanges between long-distance trains and trains on an outer orbital line. (Note: The North Liverpool Extension Line.) However, the latter line closed in 1972. The line from Liverpool Central to Garston was also closed in 1972, with trains on the CLC route being diverted to Lime Street. The route from Liverpool Central to Garston was reopened in 1978 as part of Merseyrail's Northern Line. After 1983, this route was extended to Hunts Cross, the next station to the east.

As the orbital route had been closed, the impetus to complete the station was to improve public transport access to the expanding John Lennon Airport; it was also to provide new journey opportunities for rail passengers in south Liverpool, by giving easy interchange between Northern Line, City Line and West Coast Main Line services.

Construction began in 2004. Allerton station closed in July 2005 and the new station was built on its site. The concourse, bus station and car park were built on land that was once the home of South Liverpool F.C. An information board situated on the footpath towards the main road explains the history of the site. The station opened on 11 June 2006, the day after Garston station closed.

At the time of opening, the Merseytravel City Line service (Note: The service had been hourly at the former Allerton station.) was increased to half-hourly. The station also became an additional stop on the Liverpool-Birmingham service, which was operated by Central Trains. From 11 December 2006, the Monday-Saturday evening service on the Northern Line was increased to run every 15 minutes, instead of half-hourly as it had before.

Initially, many long-distance services omitted Liverpool South Parkway from their timetables; however, more train services were gradually introduced. In December 2008, the Birmingham service was doubled in frequency and East Midlands Trains services began calling at the station.

In December 2010, a further service was introduced, when First TransPennine Express services added the station as an extra stop on their services from Liverpool to York and Scarborough.

In May 2011, Blackpool North services that operated from Lime Street were extended to start and terminate at Liverpool South Parkway. The service is operated by Northern Trains and does not call at stations between South Parkway and Lime Street. Trains travelling from Blackpool to South Parkway have a 15-minute dwelling time at Lime Street.

In early 2017, the station served as a temporary hub for national trains whilst Lime Street was closed due to a landslide. In September, platform 4 was temporarily extended by 150 m (490 ft) to allow inter-city services to serve the station whilst Lime Street station was shut for refurbishment work. In mid-2018, the station again acted as a hub whilst Lime Street was upgraded.

=== Criticism ===
Originally scheduled to open in December 2005, the project fell behind schedule and finally opened on 11 June 2006. The construction cost, originally estimated to be £16million, had doubled by the time construction was completed. Merseytravel rejected criticism of the delays and cost increase, stating that it had been caused by factors beyond its control, such as the collapse of Railtrack, increasing steel costs and poor weather causing flooding at the construction site.

Tom Wileman, regional director of bus operator Stagecoach Merseyside, described Liverpool South Parkway as a "white elephant." However, from 28 September 2008, Stagecoach service 82 was rerouted to serve the station; and trains operated by the Stagecoach-owned East Midlands Trains franchise began calling from December 2008.

=== Former services ===
From 23 May 2011, Northern Rail introduced direct services to Blackpool North; this was achieved by extending the existing Blackpool to Liverpool service. Trains ran non-stop to Lime Street, where they reversed to continue their journey to Blackpool. This service ceased to serve South Parkway in May 2018, when it reverted back to operating between Lime Street and Blackpool North only.

TransPennine Express served the station on its Scarborough services until 2018. This service was replaced with a service by Northern Trains to Manchester Airport, but has since been superseded by a new service to Cleethorpes.

During the Lime Street remodelling, platform 4 at South Parkway was temporarily extended to permit services operated by Virgin Trains to use the station while Lime Street was closed for major engineering works in autumn 2017 and summer 2018.

A shuttle bus formerly provided a link to the National Trust's property at Speke Hall, running weekends and bank holidays between April and September.

== Facilities ==
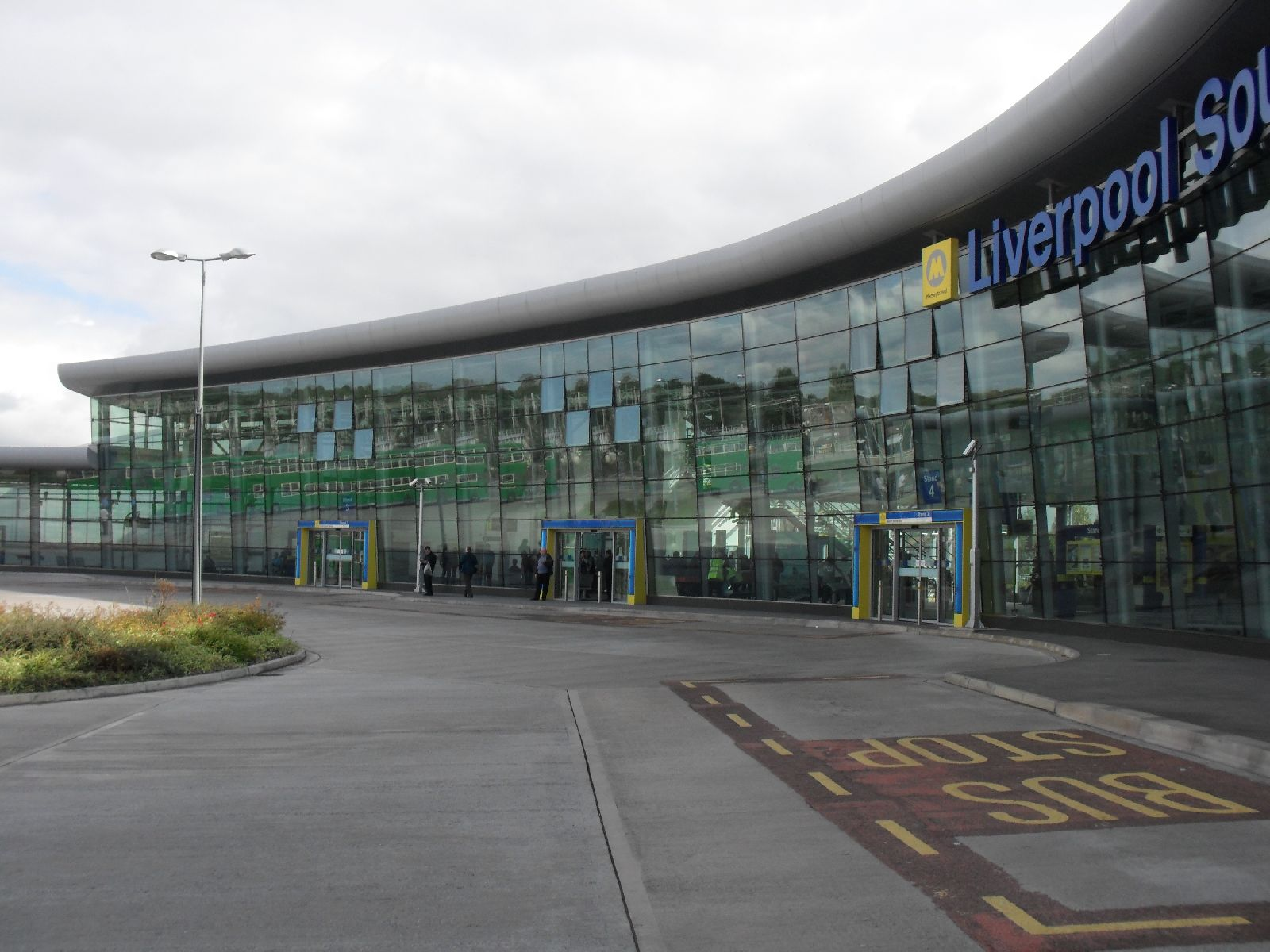
The entrance to the interchange

The station has six platforms: four high-level on the West Coast Main Line and a further two on the Northern Line. There is a bus station for local services, with a taxi rank, car park, bicycle storage, café and passenger lounge.

The station has been designed to use environmentally friendly techniques wherever possible. Some of the building's electricity is provided by photovoltaic cells. A 700,000 L (150,000 imp gal) rainwater harvesting system has also been installed to reduce the use of mains water; this is used for cleaning, washing and toilets. All timber used has been certified by the Forest Stewardship Council as being from a well-managed forest. The roof is made from recycled aluminium, instead of virgin materials. The automatic doors at each of the five bus stands open only when a bus arrives, enhancing safety; this is also retains heat within the building and avoiding excessive openings of the doors. The free-access main entrance uses a revolving door to avoid draughts.

In August 2006, Liverpool South Parkway won the Innovation Award at Network Rail's annual Environment Awards.

In June 2009, the station underwent some enhancements, which saw the introduction of a new travel centre and a heated passenger lounge with wi-fi, comfortable chairs and free newspapers.

In November 2016, an MtoGo shop was opened, selling a range of snacks and drinks alongside tickets. This replaced the former travel centre, which was converted into a Costa Coffee outlet in the summer of 2017.

== Services ==
=== Railway ===
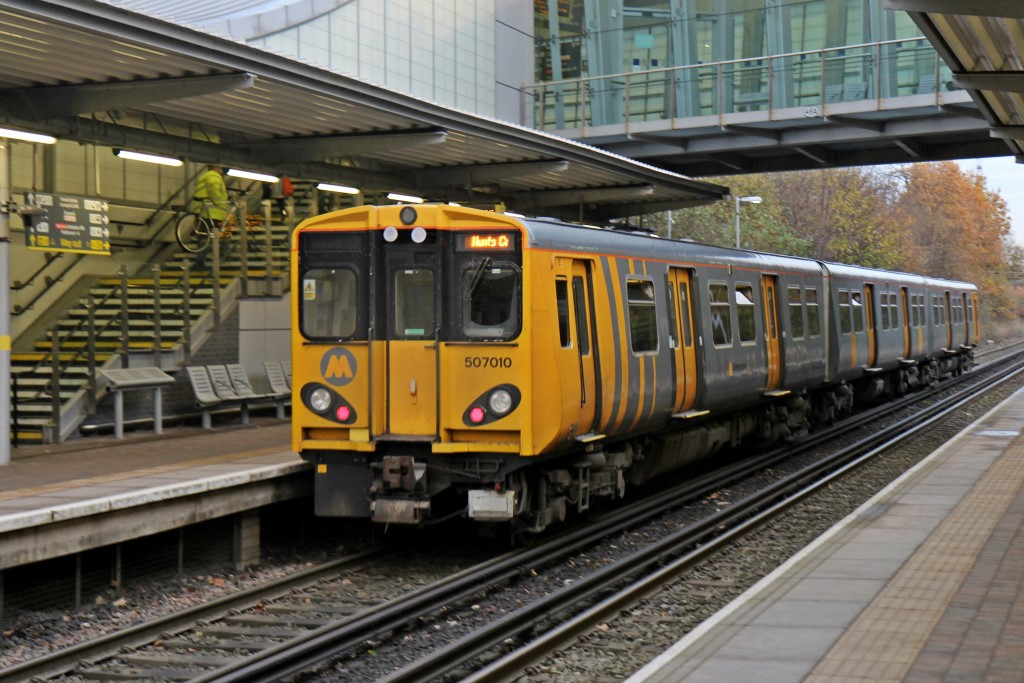
A Merseyrail Northern Line train taking passengers to Hunts Cross

The station is served by seven train operating companies, the joint-second most in Great Britain, (Note: It is joint-second along with Doncaster and Liverpool Lime Street; Crewe is served by eight) with the following general off-peak service pattern in trains per hour (tph):

Avanti West Coast:

- 1 tph to Liverpool Lime Street
- 1 tph to London Euston, via Crewe.

East Midlands Railway:

- 1 tph to Liverpool Lime Street
- 1 tph to Norwich, via Manchester Piccadilly, Stockport, Sheffield and Peterborough.

London Northwestern Railway:

- 2 tph to Liverpool Lime Street
- 2 tph to Birmingham New Street.

Merseyrail:

- 4 tph to Hunts Cross
- 4 tph to Ormskirk via Liverpool Central.

Northern Trains:

- 2 tph to Liverpool Lime Street
- 1 tph semi-fast to Manchester Oxford Road
- 1 tph to Warrington Central.

TransPennine Express:

- 1 tph to Liverpool Lime Street
- 1 tph to Cleethorpes, via Manchester Piccadilly, Stockport, Sheffield and Doncaster.

Transport for Wales:

- 1 tph to Liverpool Lime Street
- 1 tph to Llandudno, via Chester.

Preceding station	National Rail	Following station
Cressington towards Ormskirk	Merseyrail; Northern Line	Hunts Cross; Terminus
Liverpool Lime Street	TransPennine Express; South TransPennine	Warrington Central
Liverpool Lime Street	TransPennine Express; South TransPennine	Warrington West
Liverpool Lime Street	Northern Trains; Liverpool to Manchester Line	Warrington West
West Allerton	Northern Trains; Liverpool to Manchester Line	Hunts Cross
Mossley Hill towards	London Northwestern Railway Birmingham – Liverpool	Runcorn towards
Liverpool Lime Street	East Midlands Railway; Liverpool – Norwich	Widnes
Liverpool Lime Street	East Midlands Railway; Liverpool – Norwich	Hunts Cross
Liverpool Lime Street	Transport for Wales; Liverpool – Chester	Runcorn
Liverpool Lime Street	Avanti West Coast; Liverpool – London	Runcorn

=== Buses ===
Routes connect the station with Liverpool John Lennon Airport, Aigburth, Dingle, Mossley Hill, Penny Lane, Liverpool city centre, Belle Vale. Services are operated by Arriva North West and Stagecoach Merseyside & South Lancashire. Airport transfer is available on local buses.

== Future ==
In August 2009, it was reported that a new tram-train link to the airport and a link to Kings Dock from the east of the city had been proposed. The tram-train would leave the existing railway line and transfer to a new tramway. This project was referenced again in November 2016 in Merseytravel's Rail Development and Delivery presentation as a "top rail project." During the presentation, Merseytravel's head of service operations revealed that there were no immediate plans to develop the rail link and its feasibility depended on the airport's passenger numbers increasing.
