= Liverpool–Manchester lines =

Railway lines connecting Liverpool and Manchester, England

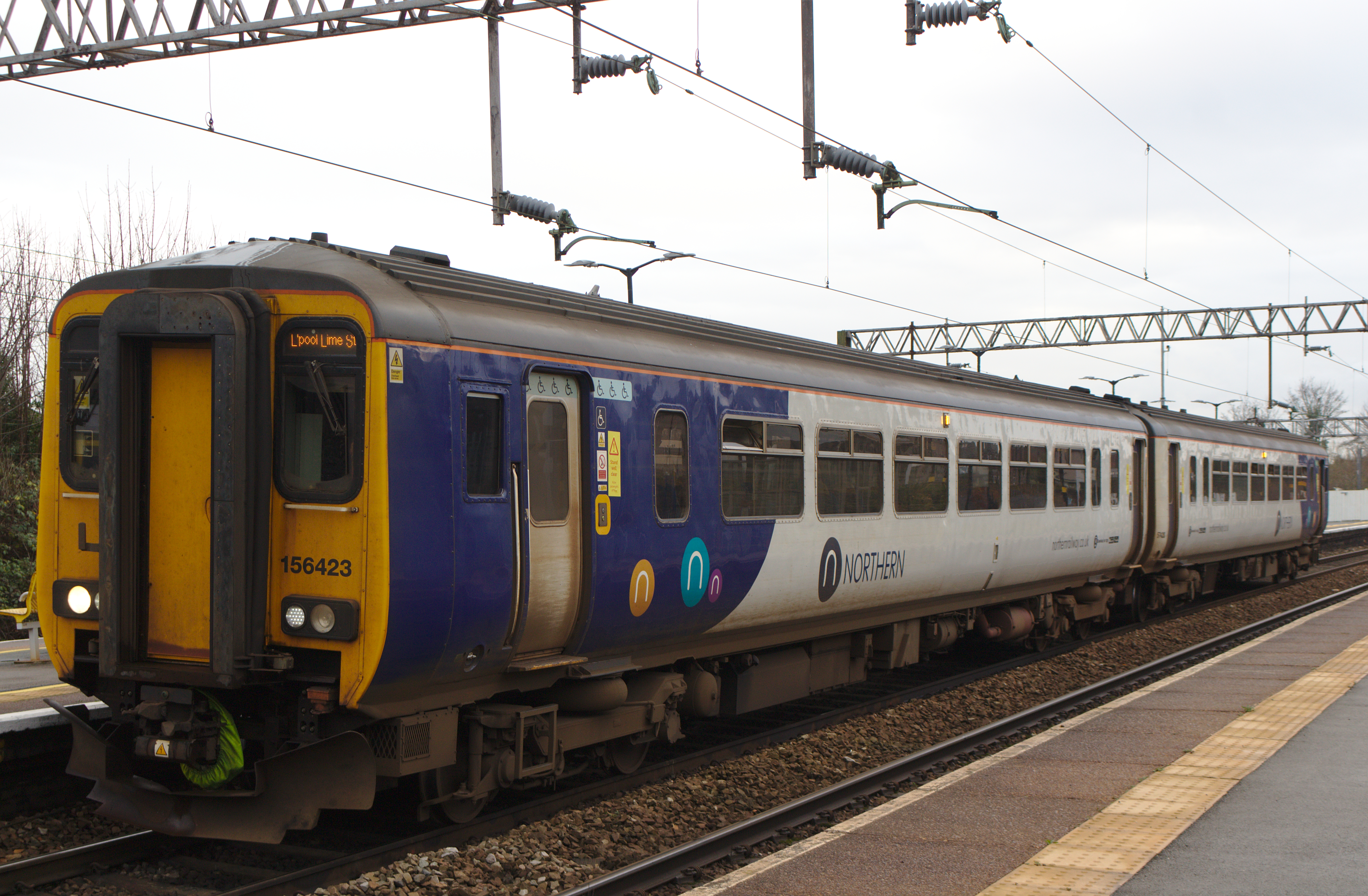
- A Northern Trains Class 156 leaving Mossley Hill station on the southern route

Overview
- Status: Operational
- Owner: Network Rail
- Locale: North West England: Cheshire; Greater Manchester; Merseyside
- Termini: Liverpool Lime Street; Manchester Victoria, Manchester Oxford Road and Manchester Piccadilly
- Stations: 38

Service
- Type: Heavy rail
- System: National Rail
- Operators: East Midlands Railway; West Midlands Trains (London Northwestern Railway); Northern Trains; Merseyrail; TransPennine Express; Transport for Wales; Avanti West Coast
- Rolling stock: Class 150 Sprinter; Class 156 Super Sprinter; Class 158 Express Sprinter; Class 185 Desiro; Class 195 Civity; Class 197 Civity; Class 222 Meridian (Limited); Class 323; Class 331 Civity; Class 350 Desiro; Class 390 Pendolino; Class 397 Civity; Class 802

Technical
- Number of tracks: Double-track
- Track gauge: 4 ft 8 1/2 in (1,435 mm) standard gauge
- Electrification: Mk1/Mk3/UK1 and Series 2 25 kV 50 Hz AC OHLE Lime Street – Liverpool South Parkway. Lime Street – Manchester Piccadilly Northern Route and also Manchester Victoria
Route map
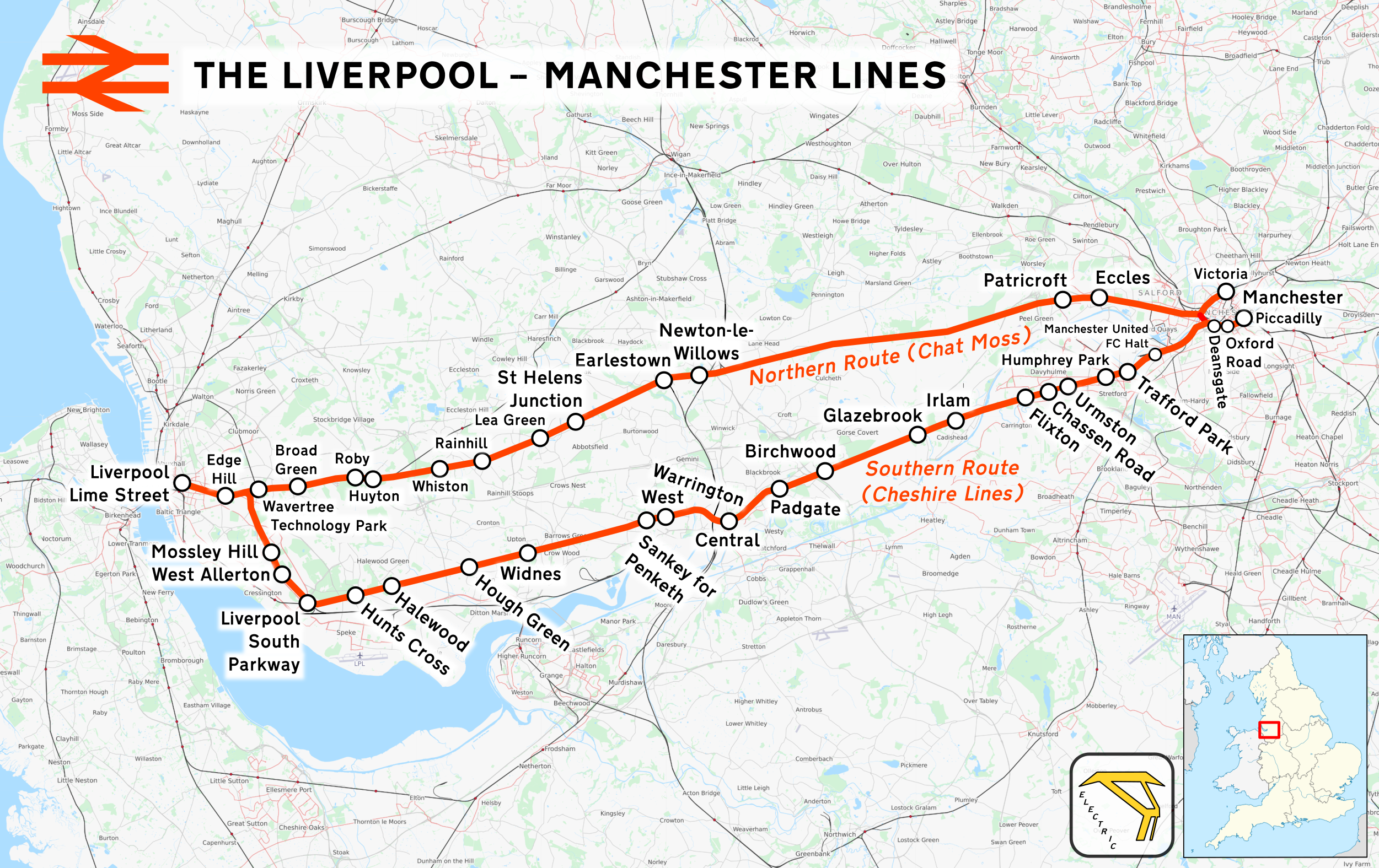

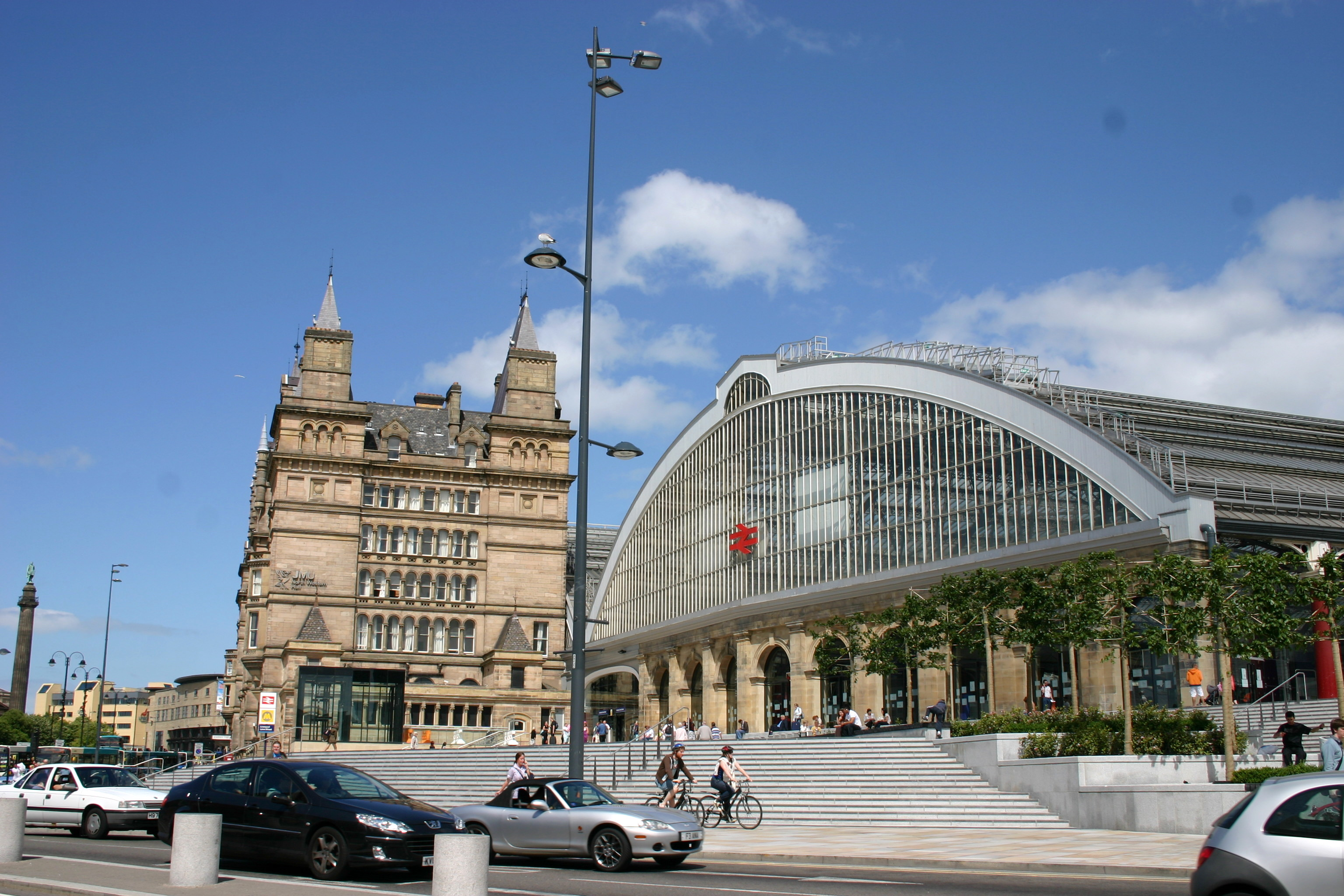
Liverpool Lime Street station, the terminus for both the northern and southern routes to Manchester.

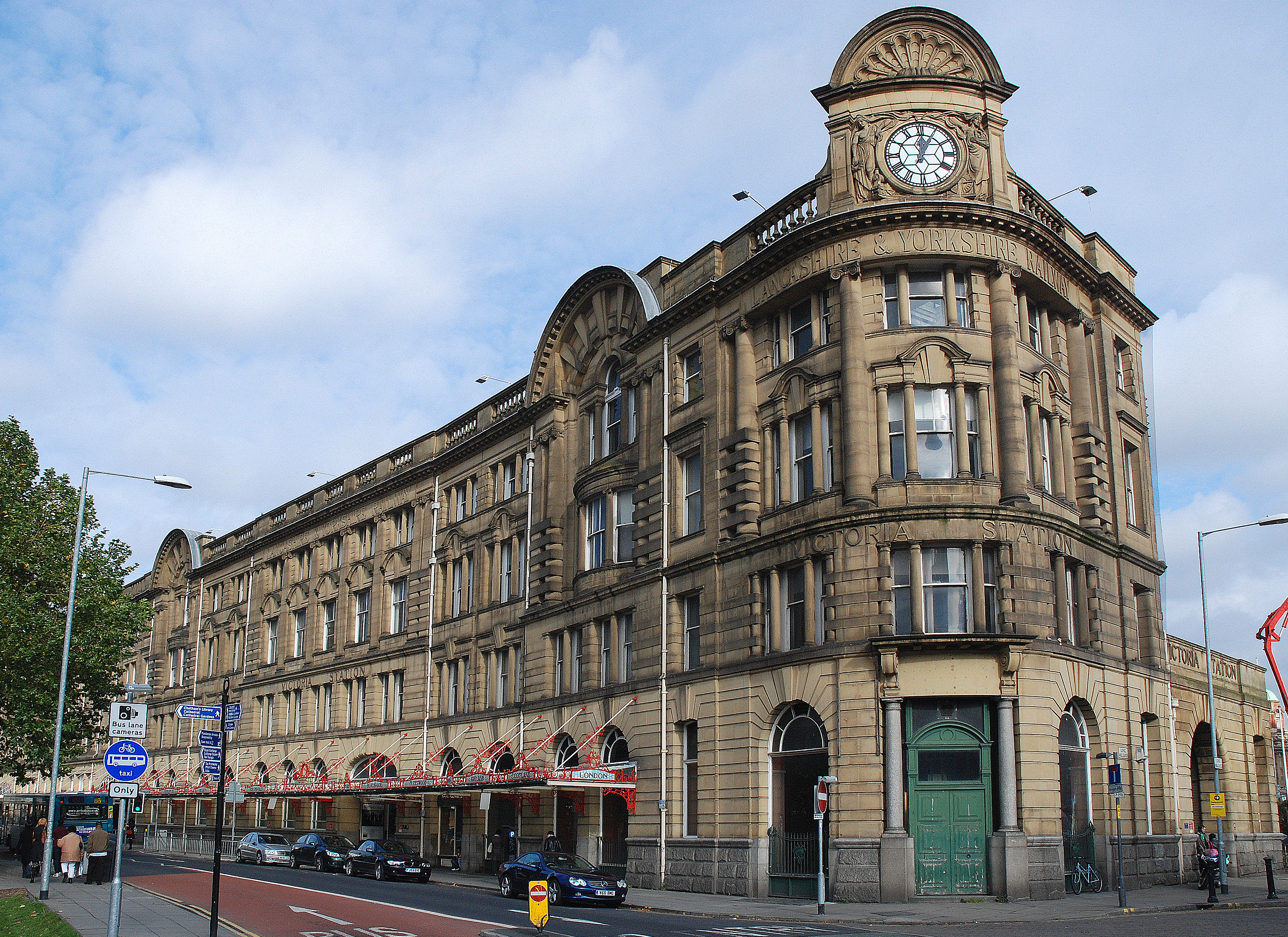
Manchester Victoria station, the terminus for the northern Liverpool–Manchester route.

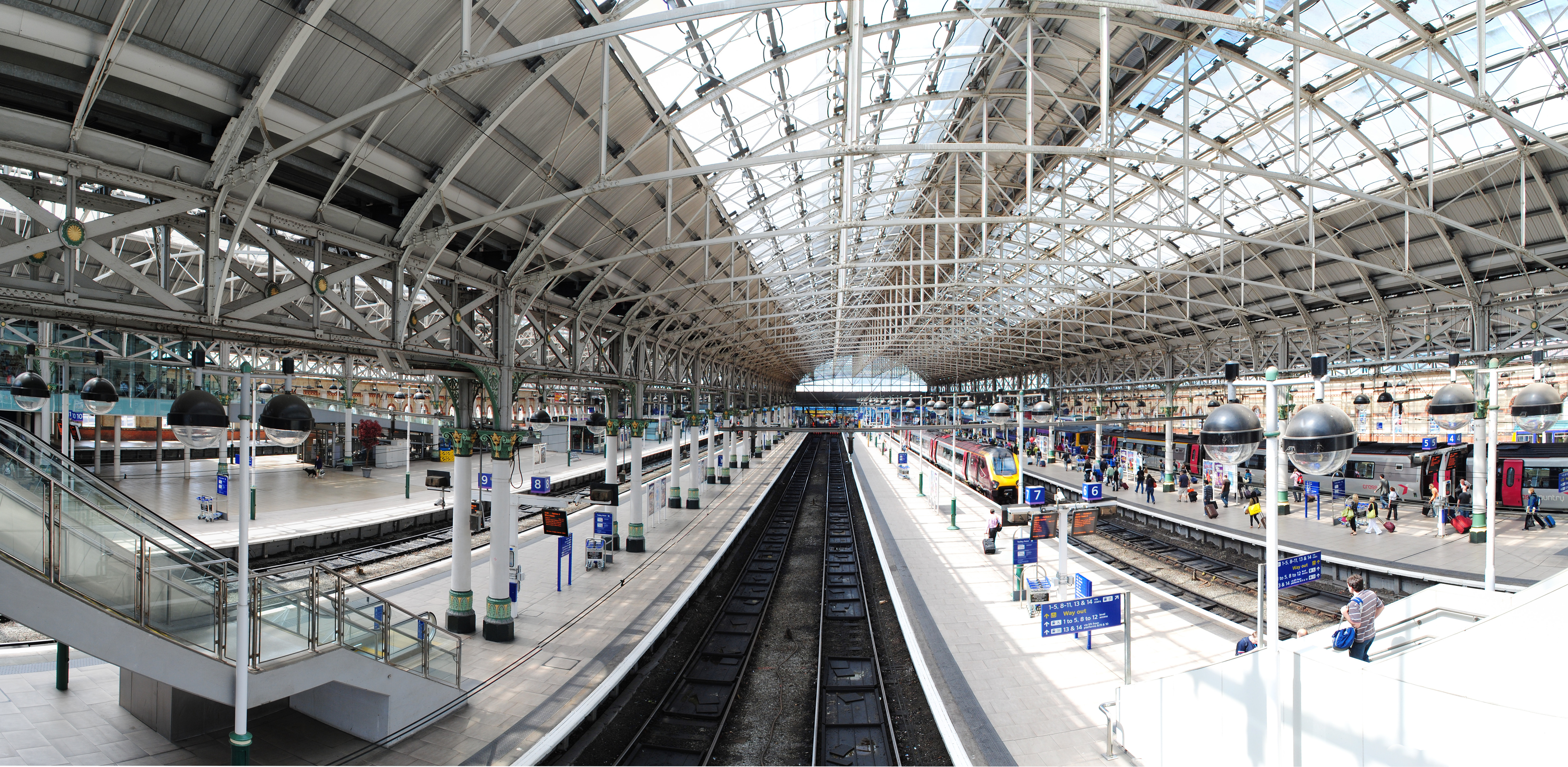
Manchester Piccadilly station, the terminus of both the northern and southern Liverpool–Manchester route.

There are two direct Liverpool–Manchester lines, the railway routes between the cities of Liverpool and Manchester in North West England. A northern Chat Moss line via St Helens Junction, and a southern CLC line via Warrington Central. Historically, there were a total of four railway lines between the two cities, with a further northern direct route via Wigan and a further southern route via Ditton Junction. These two other lines can no longer operate direct services, with only the middle two of the four remaining as complete direct lines.

The northern route, the Chat Moss line, is fully electric, and spans from Liverpool Lime Street terminus station via Earlestown, Newton-le-Willows and Lea Green to Manchester Victoria and Manchester Piccadilly. This line follows the route of the original 1830 Liverpool and Manchester Railway.

The southern route, the CLC line, is mostly diesel-only, though it shares its westernmost section with the electrified West Coast Main Line. It stretches from Liverpool Lime Street terminus via Warrington Central to Manchester Piccadilly operates on lines formerly owned by the Cheshire Lines Committee (CLC).

The two other historical lines that no longer operate trains directly between the two are:

- The former northernmost route via Wigan, which has been split into two services, with its western section part of the electrified Merseyrail Northern line services up to Headbolt Lane, and the eastern section used by diesel services from Headbolt Lane to Manchester, therefore passengers require a change at Headbolt Lane (or Kirkby before 2023).
- The former southernmost route via Ditton Junction, which has been largely abandoned east of Warrington; with a section from Altrincham into Manchester being part of the Altrincham Line, a Metrolink tram line, while the remaining western section caters mainly for freight trains.

== Northern route (Chat Moss line) ==
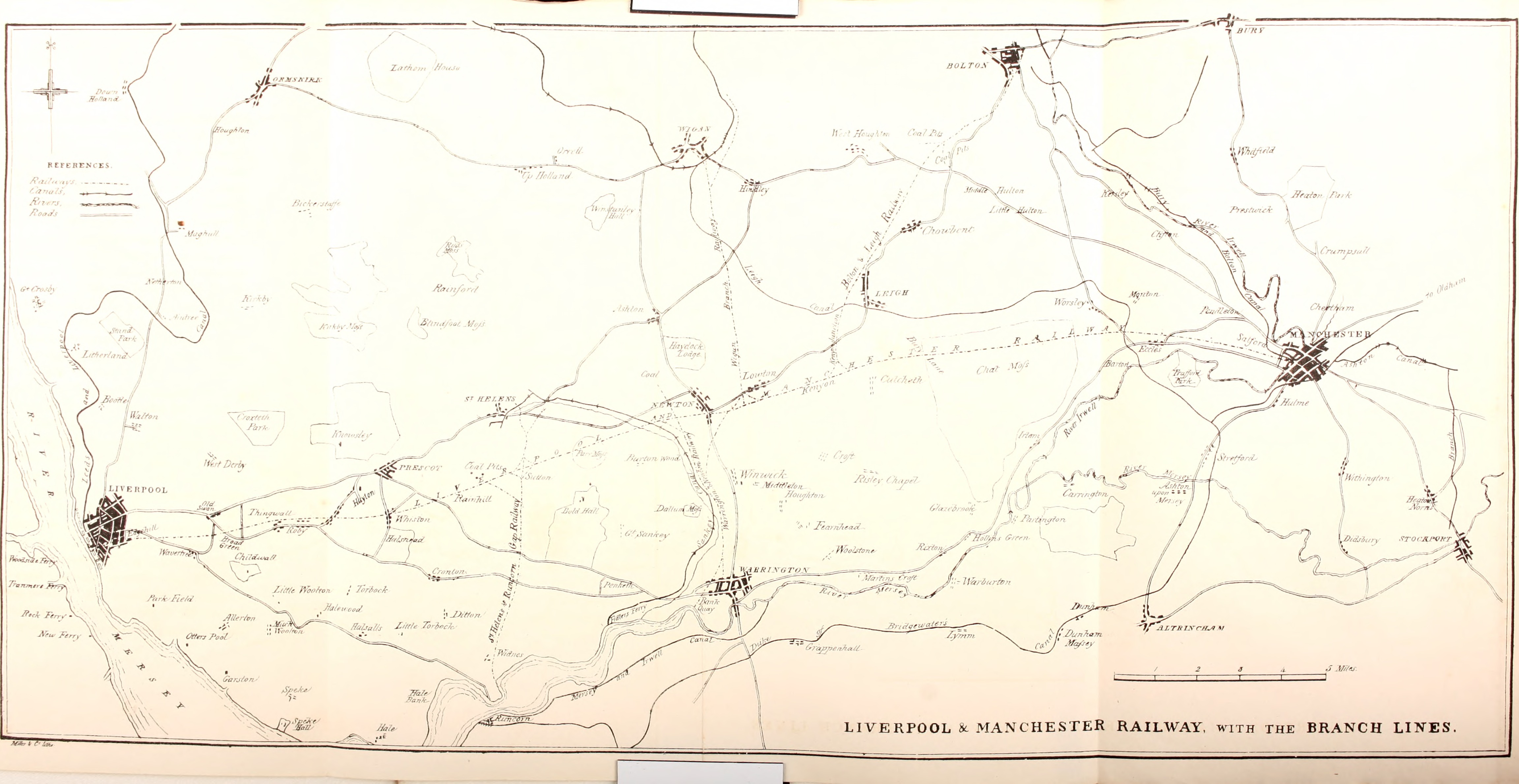
1869 map showing the northern route

The northern route runs from Liverpool Lime Street, via Earlestown and Newton-le-Willows, and continues to either Manchester Victoria or Manchester Piccadilly. The line follows George Stephenson's original 32-mile (51.5 km) Liverpool and Manchester Railway of 1830, which was the world's first inter-city passenger railway and the first to have run 'scheduled' services. Many early steam locomotives were initially used on this line including Stephenson's Rocket, which won the Rainhill Trials in 1829 (see List of Liverpool and Manchester Railway locomotives). The line also includes listed structures including stations and bridges, particularly the Rainhill Skew Bridge and the nine-arch Sankey Viaduct.

=== Current services ===
Following completion of electrification in May 2015, services to Manchester Airport and Manchester Victoria are operated by Class 323 three-car and Class 331 three-car and four-car electric multiple units (EMUs).

Northern Trains operates two trains per hour on the Chat Moss line, an hourly all-stops service from Liverpool Lime Street to Manchester Airport operated by Class 323 and 331 EMUs and an hourly service from Chester to Leeds via Bradford Interchange which calls at Earlestown and Newton-le-Willows, operated by Class 195 diesel multiple units (DMUs).

During weekday peak times, two daily return trains operate between Liverpool Lime Street and Manchester Victoria: one service in the morning and one in the evening, calling at all stations. Six daily return trains also operate between Manchester Victoria and Wigan North Western: three services in the morning and three in the evening at hourly frequency via Eccles, although only morning services towards Manchester and evening services towards Wigan call at the station.

A limited service operates between Ellesmere Port and Liverpool via the western section of the Chat Moss route, calling at all stations between Earlestown and Lime Street.

Between Earlestown and Manchester Airport, there are additional hourly services operated by Transport for Wales, which originate from Llandudno via the North Wales Coast Line and Chester.

Northern Trains is the dominant operator on the route, and its services are operated with Class 323 three-car EMUs, Class 331 three-car or four-car electric multiple units or Class 195 two-car or three-car DMUs. Transport for Wales services between Earlestown and Manchester Piccadilly are usually operated by Class 197 DMUs, but Class 158 units may be substituted on occasions.

TransPennine Express operates an hourly service between Liverpool Lime Street and Newcastle Central via Manchester Victoria and York, calling at Lea Green and Newton-le-Willows, operated by Class 802 bi-mode units.

A similar service operates on a Sunday; however the Liverpool Lime Street to Manchester Airport service is extended to Wilmslow and the Llandudno service terminates at Chester.

The northern Liverpool to Manchester route is also used by East Midlands Railway for empty coaching stock (ECS) movements, and as a diversionary route when the southern route is closed.

In past years, the line has been used by many express services which included through trains to Leeds, York and Newcastle (via Huddersfield), and to Preston, Glasgow Central and Edinburgh (diverging on to the West Coast Main Line at Newton-le-Willows). Local trains also ran to Manchester via Leigh, but these services ceased in 1969 when the Eccles-Tyldesley-Leigh-Kenyon branch was closed as a result of the Beeching Axe. The northern Liverpool to Manchester line has also seen regular use over the years for diverted services from the West Coast Main Line when parts of the latter have been closed for engineering work, but diversions via Manchester instead have now become more common as they do not involve the train reversing, as would be necessary at Edge Hill, following the electrification of the route.

Work to four-track the line between Huyton and Roby was completed in October 2017.

=== Technical details ===
The key junctions on this route are:

- Edge Hill West Junction (to CLC line via Warrington Central)
- Edge Hill East Junction (to Edge Hill CS)
- Bootle Branch Junction (to Canada Dock Branch, leading to the docks)
- Olive Mount Junction (Olive Mount Junction Chat Moss to Regent Rd)
- Huyton Junction (to Wigan line)
- Earlestown West Junction (West Coast Main Line Southbound via Warrington Bank Quay)
- Earlestown East Junction (West Coast Main Line Southbound via Warrington Bank Quay)
- Newton-le-Willows Junction (for daily Wigan via Golborne Junction services)
- Parkside Junction (for daily Wigan via Golborne Junction services)
- Eccles Station Junction (to the Weaste branch towards the Manchester Ship Canal)
- Ordsall Lane Junction (separates Chat Moss line (to Victoria) from Bolton lines (to Piccadilly)

During a journey trains are controlled by:

- Lime Street control (LS) (Lime Street and the Lime Street tunnels) - now dedicated desk at new Manchester Rail Operating Centre (LL)
- Edge Hill signal box (LE) (Edge Hill to Edge Hill junction)
- Sandhills IECC (ML) (Olive Mount Jn To Regent Rd)
- Huyton signal box (HN) (Edge Hill to Huyton) - now dedicated desk at new Manchester Rail Operating Centre (LL)
- Warrington signal box (WN)
- Astley signal box (AY)
- Eccles signal box (ES)
- Manchester Piccadilly control (MP)

The above is likely to change in the future as various sections are migrated over to the control of the new Manchester Rail Operating Centre at Ashburys.

=== Electrification ===
From 5 March 2015, Class 319 trains started electric operation on this route from Liverpool to Manchester Airport via the Oxford Road viaduct. Manchester Victoria station is now electrified and at the new timetable changeover on 17 May 2015 Liverpool to Manchester Victoria stopping services also began electric operation using the same rolling stock.

As a result of completion of the Manchester Castlefield Junction to Newton-le-Willows Junction electrification, TransPennine Express services between Manchester Airport and Glasgow Central/Edinburgh Waverley now use new Class 350 EMUs and are re-routed along a portion of the northern Liverpool to Manchester route before joining the West Coast Main Line at Golborne Junction. TransPennine Express Class 185 DMUs, which formerly operated the Manchester Airport - Glasgow/Edinburgh service are now being redeployed to other routes.

The Department for Transport initially announced in July 2009 that the northern route of the Manchester to Liverpool line was to be electrified with 25 kV, 50 Hz AC, overhead line. The electrification process was originally due to be completed by 2013 but following a change of government in 2010, the work was delayed meaning that, while the Manchester to Newton-le-Willows section was completed by December 2013 to enable Manchester - Scotland electric services, the remaining section to Liverpool was not completed until 5 March 2015. Now that the electrification of the line is complete and electric services are running, the journey time between Liverpool and Manchester has been reduced from around 45 minutes to 30 minutes due to the greater acceleration achieved by electric trains and the raising of the speed limit along the line from 75 to 90 mph (121 to 145 km/h). Class 319 EMUs have been fully refurbished and transferred from the Thameslink route to operate between Liverpool and Manchester, while Thameslink services will be operated by new energy-efficient trains, which were originally due to be delivered between 2011 and 2013. Electrification also offers electric haulage options for freight trains, giving a secondary route to the West Coast Main Line from Liverpool.

== Southern route (CLC line) ==
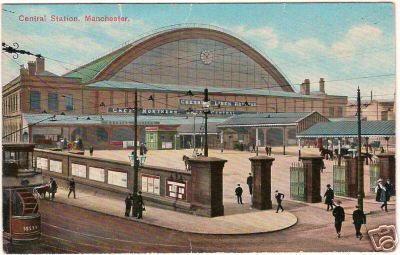
The original Manchester Central terminus station

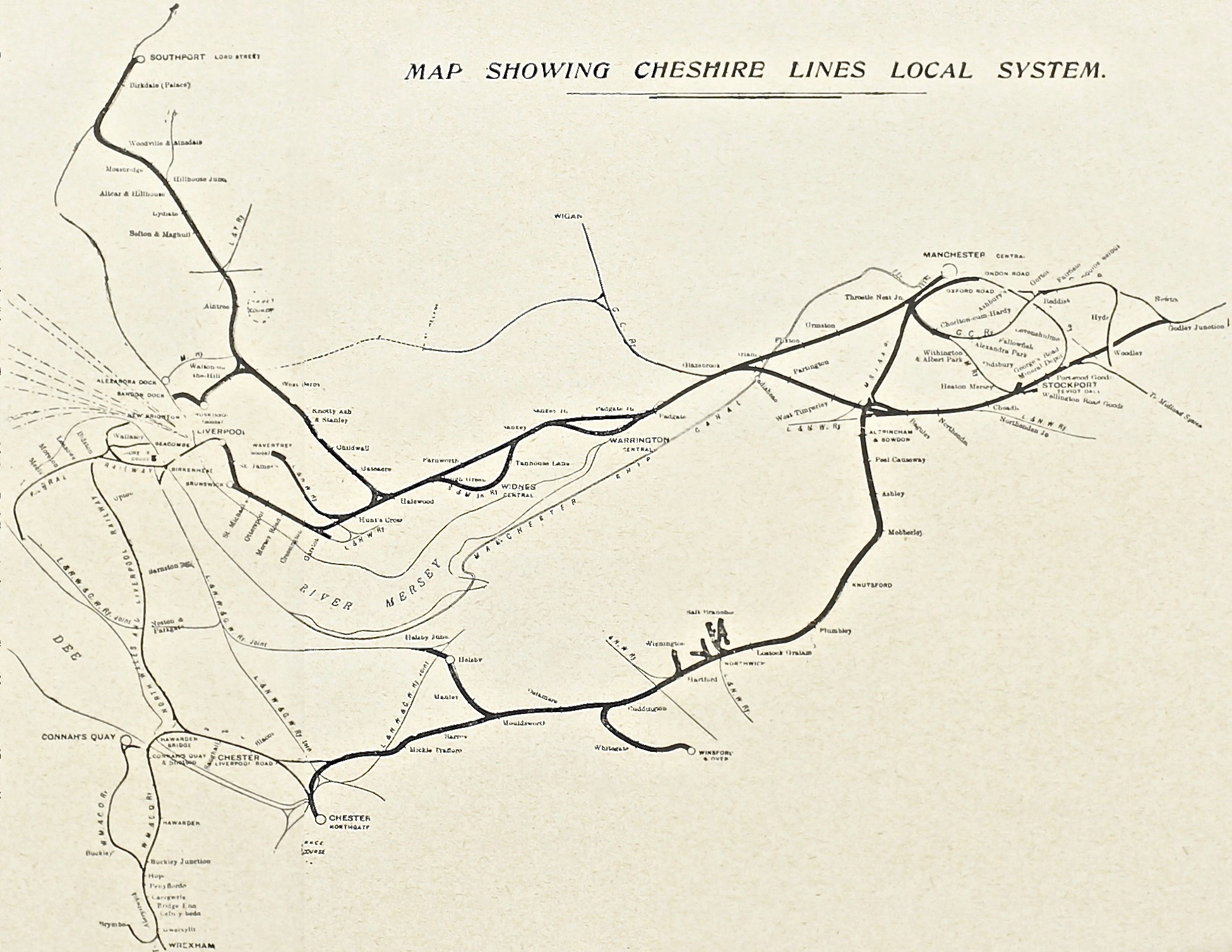
1899 map showing the southern route

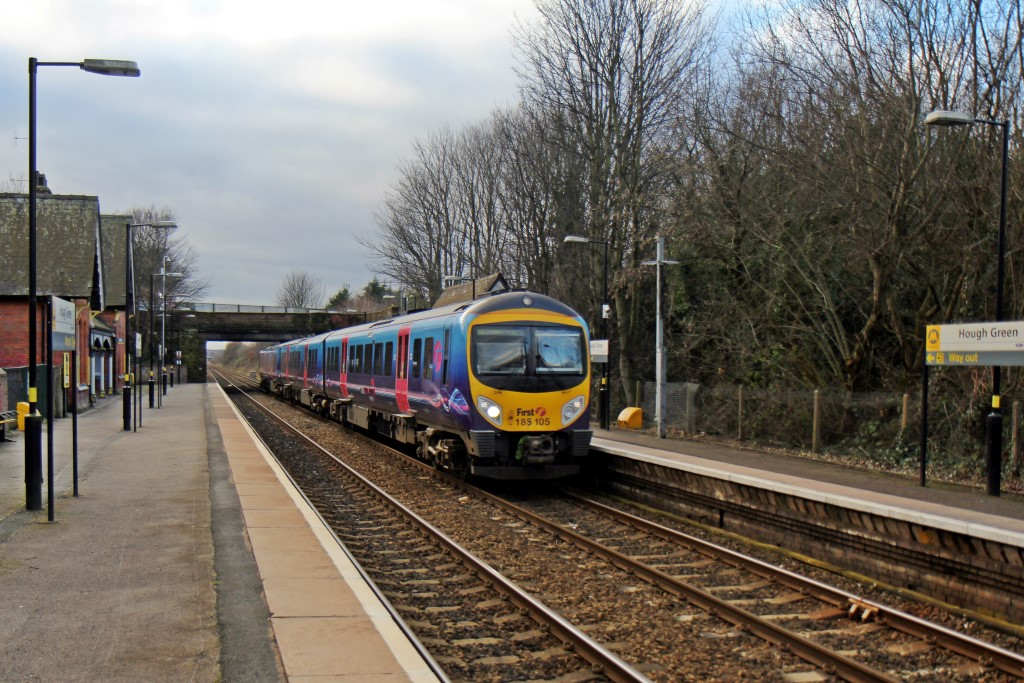
A First TransPennine Express Class 185 passing Hough Green station on the Southern route in 2014 before TPE services were diverted via Newton-le-Willows

The southern route is the old Cheshire Lines Committee line running from Liverpool Lime Street via Warrington Central to Manchester Piccadilly. There are three passenger trains per hour (tph) in each direction between Liverpool and Manchester, which are usually operated by a variety of Class 150, Class 156 and Class 158 DMUs. TransPennine Express used to use modern Class 185 trains, before their services were diverted via the northern route. These services are run by various rail companies and the time intervals are not evenly spaced out; there are large gaps between some services, and at other times trains leave within minutes of each other. While East Midlands Railway's once per hour service generally take 50 minutes to reach Manchester from Liverpool Lime Street, some Northern services take an hour and ten minutes to cover the 35 miles. This route is less busy than the northern route in terms of service frequency (1 express & 2 stopping trains per hour each way over the entire route.)

The line's newest station is Warrington West, which opened in December 2019. Liverpool South Parkway station opened in June 2006 after its estimated construction cost of £16 million had doubled to £32 million by the time it was completed. This station replaced Allerton and Garston stations and has frequent bus links to Liverpool John Lennon Airport.

Originally this line ran from Liverpool Central High Level terminus station to Manchester Central terminus station built by the Cheshire Lines Committee (CLC) in 1873. Liverpool Central High Level station was demolished in 1973 due to all the long-haul distance services on Merseyside being concentrated at Liverpool Lime Street with Merseyrail operating the local urban services with underground stations in Liverpool and Birkenhead centres. Manchester Central closed in 1969 and is now the Manchester Central Convention Complex.

At the Liverpool end, the line from Hunts Cross to Central High Level station (which accessed the station via a tunnel) was no longer used by Warrington trains from 1966; these were diverted from Hunts Cross onto the short section of the West Coast Main Line to Lime Street station. The divergence is at Allerton Junction to the immediate south east of Liverpool South Parkway.

In 1977–1978, the original line in the tunnel approaching Liverpool Central High Level terminus was dropped into a new lower level tunnel immediately south of the station to enter Liverpool Central underground station becoming a through line continuing underground to the north of Liverpool and onto Southport.

At the Manchester end the line was diverted to Manchester Oxford Road and Manchester Piccadilly after Manchester Central was closed.

The Liverpool to Warrington section of this line was initially scheduled to be on the Merseyrail electric urban network. The Strategic Plan for the North West, the SPNW, in 1973 envisaged that the Outer Loop which was to be an orbital line circling the city of Liverpool, the Edge Hill Spur which is a tunnel connecting the east of Liverpool to the central underground sections, and the lines to St. Helens, Wigan and Warrington would be electrified and all integrated into Merseyrail by 1991. This meant that trains from Warrington would access Liverpool city centre's underground stations via the Northern Line and Liverpool Central underground station, giving access to Liverpool's shopping and business quarters. This never transpired; however, it is a long-term aspiration of Merseytravel.

The Liverpool City Region Combined Authority announced in July 2021 that trials of battery-electric Class 777 trains had been successful with the new units able to travel up to 20 miles on batteries. This opens up the possibilities of the trains being used to serve Warrington from Liverpool on this line, conforming to the original Merseyrail plan.

=== Planned electrification ===
Trains run on electrified track between the cities of Liverpool and Manchester on the Northern route (Chat Moss route). However, only diesel engine propulsion can be used on the Southern route (Cheshire Lines route) which is electrified at 25 kV AC only from Liverpool Lime Street for 6.2 miles to Hunts Cross West Junction (since 1962) and from central Manchester to Cornbrook (1971) and Trafford Park freight terminal (1980), 2.9 miles from Piccadilly. This line has been prioritised for full electrification between the two cities; however no date has been set for the commencement of works.

=== Current services ===
Northern Trains operates two trains per hour on the southern route between Liverpool Lime Street and Warrington Central, with one train per hour extending to Manchester Oxford Road. The Manchester service is semi-fast until Warrington, and the service terminating at Warrington calls at all stations (except Sankey for Penketh which receives a limited service). Northern operates a mixture of Classes 150, 156 and 195 units along the line.

East Midlands Railway operates an hourly fast service between Liverpool Lime Street and Norwich, calling at Liverpool South Parkway, Widnes, Warrington Central, Manchester Oxford Road and Manchester Piccadilly. EMR mainly use Class 158s along the line, although Class 170s are used sometimes.

TransPennine Express also operates a fast hourly service using this line from Liverpool Lime Street to Cleethorpes – this was extended from Manchester Piccadilly in December 2022. All services call at Liverpool South Parkway, Warrington Central and Birchwood, most services call at Irlam and Urmston and a few services in the morning and evening peaks call at Warrington West. All TransPennine services on this route use Class 185 units.

In the past, the Cheshire Lines Committee route was used by a variety of local services in addition to limited-stop expresses between the two cities. These included trains between Warrington Central and Stockport Tiviot Dale, Liverpool and Manchester to Wigan Central. and Liverpool to Southport Lord Street via Aintree Central. The latter route was closed in 1952. The diversion of Liverpool-bound trains to Lime Street in 1966 and the closure of Manchester Central in 1969 (all trains subsequently running to Oxford Road and Piccadilly) saw the route downgraded in importance and from then until the mid-1980s it was operated as a self-contained route due to congestion issues at the Manchester end. The service frequency was also lower than at present, for example the British Rail 1985 timetable showed one semi-fast and one stopping train per hour in each direction on weekdays (excluding the weekday peak periods). Through running to destinations east of Manchester via this route began on a regular basis only in 1986, when the opening of a new connection at Hazel Grove allowed trains from the Sheffield direction to run via Stockport and thus avoid conflicting movements across the station throat at Piccadilly.

The route from Liverpool to Manchester via Newton le Willows has been popular in recent years with steam locomotive-worked excursion trains. The second route from Liverpool through Hunts Cross and Warrington Central to Manchester rarely sees steam-worked excursion trains; the most recent was in 2013 for the 45th anniversary special run of the Fifteen Guinea Special. The original route through Newton-le-Willows was closed for electrification work.

=== Technical details ===
The key junctions on this route are:

- Lime Street (used to move trains onto appropriate platform)
- Edge Hill East Junction (for the Huyton line)
- Allerton West Junction (to West Coast Main Line, known as Allerton junction)
- Hunts Cross Junction (to Merseyrail Northern Line)
- Glazebrook East Junction (formerly for Warrington-Stockport services, but now used as a passing point)
- Trafford Park Junction (for Euroterminal freight terminal)
- Castlefield Junction (where lines to Manchester converge).

During a journey trains are controlled by:

- Lime Street control (LS) (Lime Street and the Lime Street tunnels) – now dedicated desk at new Manchester Rail Operating Centre (LL)
- Edge Hill signal box (LE) (Edge Hill to Edge Hill junction)
- Allerton signal box (AN) (Edge Hill junction to Liverpool South Parkway)
- Hunts Cross signal box (HC) (Allerton junction to Widnes Station)
- Warrington Central signal box (WC) (Widnes station to Padgate station)
- Glazebrook East signal box (GE) (Birchwood station to Urmston)
- Manchester Piccadilly control (MP) (Urmston to route terminus)

The above is likely to change in the future as various sections are migrated over to the control of the new Manchester Rail Operating Centre at Ashburys.

== Former direct routes ==
Map of all four routes in 1960 Via Kirkby and Wigan (Route no longer direct; passengers must change at Headbolt Lane near Kirkby) Northern route (Chat Moss) Southern route (Cheshire Lines Committee) (Route within Liverpool now follows the black route.) Via Ditton Junction (Tracks no longer exist between Warrington and Altrincham.) Other lines

=== Via Wigan ===
It is possible to travel between Liverpool Central and Manchester Victoria via Wigan Wallgate. However, since 1977, this route requires a change (from 2023 at Headbolt Lane, previously at Kirkby), from the Merseyrail electric Northern Line hybrid battery trains to the Northern Trains diesel trains. Sections of this route were built by the Lancashire and Yorkshire Railway and their acquired railways, such as the Liverpool and Bury Railway and the Manchester and Southport Railway.

This line was partially built by the Liverpool and Bury Railway, opening in 1848, which later merged into the Lancashire and Yorkshire Railway; on acquisition, it owned the Manchester and Southport Railway which formed the complete continuous line from Liverpool into Manchester. The route was continuous from Liverpool Exchange to Manchester Victoria. With the creation of the electric Merseyrail urban network, the line was effectively cut into two with two different modes of traction. The Liverpool half is fast third rail electric and the Manchester side slower diesel traction. The point at which the two modes meet is Headbolt Lane which functions as a terminus for the electric and diesel services. As Headbolt Lane station is on the formerly diesel end of the Kirkby branch, the Merseyrail services change power from third rail to batteries at Kirkby and continue the journey using battery power.

The Merseyrail terminus at the Liverpool end of the line was extended from Liverpool Exchange to underground Liverpool Central. With the closure of Exchange station in 1977, the terminus at the Liverpool end of the diesel service was cut back to Kirkby station, although the connection point was later changed to Headbolt Lane in 2023. Passengers from Manchester alight at Headbolt Lane and walk down from platform 3 to 1 or 2, boarding a Liverpool bound electric train terminating at Liverpool's underground Central station. The diesel train from Manchester is scheduled to meet a Merseyrail electric train from Liverpool at Headbolt Lane (albeit a tight connection) for ease of passenger transfers. A new underground through station was built at Moorfields replacing some of the services of nearby Liverpool Exchange terminus station.

At 37 miles (59.5 km) this route is longer than either of the two direct routes. According to the National Rail Enquiries website the travelling time from end to end would be 1 hour 38 minutes, including the change, compared with around 30 minutes from Lime Street to Manchester Piccadilly. However, despite the split at Headbolt Lane, the line is still useful for travelling into either Liverpool or Manchester.

=== Via Ditton Junction ===
A further southerly route, using what was St Helens and Runcorn Gap Railway and Warrington and Stockport Railway, connected Liverpool Lime Street with Manchester Oxford Road via Ditton Junction (south west of Widnes), Warrington Bank Quay (low level platforms) and Timperley (north of Altrincham). East of Warrington the line has been abandoned and now forms part of the Trans Pennine Trail, and from Timperley into Manchester is now the Altrincham Line of the Manchester Metrolink tram system. Fiddlers Ferry Power station was decommissioned on 31 March 2020, leaving the line rarely used. What will become of the line between Widnes and Warrington is uncertain. Northern Powerhouse Rail have suggested the line be used to access Liverpool for both NPR and HS2 prior to the cancellation of HS2 phase 2.

== Timings and line speeds ==
As of 2016, the fastest journey times are around half an hour, which is little better than over a century earlier. The fastest recorded run was from Manchester Exchange to Liverpool Lime St in 30 minutes 46 seconds by a 1936 built Jubilee 5707 with seven coaches. An 1882-built compound steam locomotive was timed on the same route in 38 minutes 18 seconds.

Until 1968, trains from Liverpool to Manchester by all three routes were scheduled to take 40 minutes and often took less. The southern route via Warrington is now restricted to 85 mph and the northern route via Earlestown to 90 mph (140 km/h), with 75 mph (121 km/h) over Chat Moss peat bog.

== See also ==
- Eccles rail crash (1941)
- Eccles rail crash (1984)
