= Knotty Ash =

Area of Liverpool, England

Coordinates: 53.413°N 2.890°W

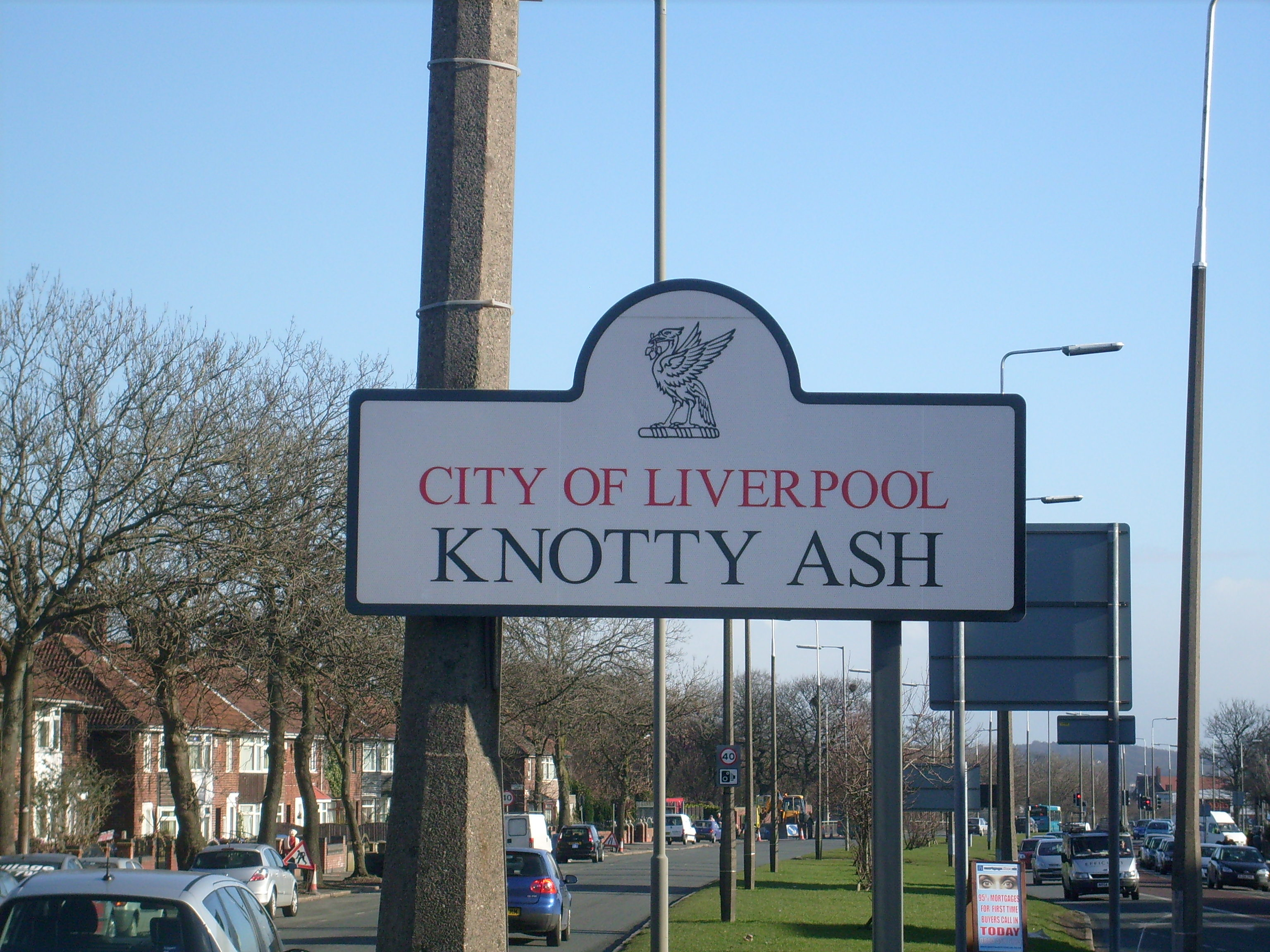
- Knotty Ash district sign

- Location within Merseyside
- Population: 13,312 (2011 Census)
- OS grid reference: SJ408911
- Metropolitan borough: City of Liverpool
- Metropolitan county: Merseyside
- Region: North West
- Country: England
- Sovereign state: United Kingdom
- Post town: LIVERPOOL
- Postcode district: L14
- Dialling code: 0151
- Police: Merseyside
- Fire: Merseyside
- Ambulance: North West
- UK Parliament: Liverpool West Derby

Knotty Ash is an area of Liverpool, Merseyside, England, and a Liverpool City Council Ward, historically in Lancashire. The population at the 2001 Census was 13,200, increasing to 13,312 at the 2011 Census. Knotty Ash is well known as the home of comedian Sir Ken Dodd, who often mentioned it in his act.

== Description ==
Knotty Ash is a small area on the eastern fringe of Liverpool and neighbours the West Derby, Old Swan, Broadgreen, Dovecot and Huyton districts. Its name is derived from a gnarled ash tree which formerly stood near the present-day Knotty Ash public house. In 2004, comedian and local resident Ken Dodd planted a new ash tree close to the site of the original.

== Governance ==
Knotty Ash is represented on Liverpool City Council by three councillors, and is wholly within the Liverpool West Derby constituency. The current MP is Ian Byrne (Labour), who has represented the seat since 2019.

== Education ==
Knotty Ash has the special needs secondary school Clifford Holroyde and a primary school, Knotty Ash CP.

== Transport ==
Knotty Ash has an extensive bus network which, in the main, uses the Prescot Road corridor. Services 7, 8/9, 10/10A/10B, 15 and 204 link Knotty Ash to Liverpool City Centre, and these services provide links to Dingle, Toxteth, Edge Hill, Kensington, Tuebrook, Wavertree, Old Swan, Stoneycroft, Broadgreen Hospital, Belle Vale, Page Moss and Huyton, with some of these services going further afield to Prescot, Whiston, Cronton, Thatto Heath, St Helens, Penketh and Warrington.

There are also services like the 61 (Bootle - Aigburth) and 102 (Page Moss/Broadgreen Hospital - Fazakerley Hospital) which do not service the city centre, but provide links to various areas of North and South Liverpool, Knowsley and Sefton. In addition, there are various industrial and school bus services which pass through Knotty Ash.

Knotty Ash railway station on the North Liverpool Extension Line formerly served the area, but this closed to passenger traffic in 1960. The former trackway is now part of National Cycle Network Route 62. The nearest current National Rail station is Broad Green, approximately a mile away from Knotty Ash, where fairly regular trains go to/from Liverpool Lime Street, and generally continue on to Wigan North Western, Manchester Victoria and Warrington Bank Quay stations.

Knotty Ash is also approximately a mile away from the western terminus of the M62 motorway, Rocket Roundabout in Broadgreen.

== Sport ==
Between 1951 and 1968, the district was home to the city's rugby league team Liverpool City who played at their Knotty Ash Stadium, Mill Yard. Their playing strip consisted of white jerseys with a broad green hoop and white shorts. After the 1967–68 season, they left the district and moved to nearby Huyton, changing the club's name to Huyton RLFC. Having no home venue for the 1968–69 season, their new Huyton home ground of Alt Park was opened for the following 1969–70 season.

== In popular culture ==
In the 1960s, Knotty Ash was made famous in the United Kingdom by stand-up comedian and lifelong resident Ken Dodd, as the home of the dwarfish comic characters he called the Diddy Men. In his BBC children's television programme Ken Dodd and the Diddymen (1969), the fictitious Diddyland, boasting the highest sunshine rate in the world, was situated in the centre of Knotty Ash. The Diddy Men worked in the local "Jam Butty Mines".
