= Knotty Ash railway station =

Former railway station in England

Knotty Ash & Stanley
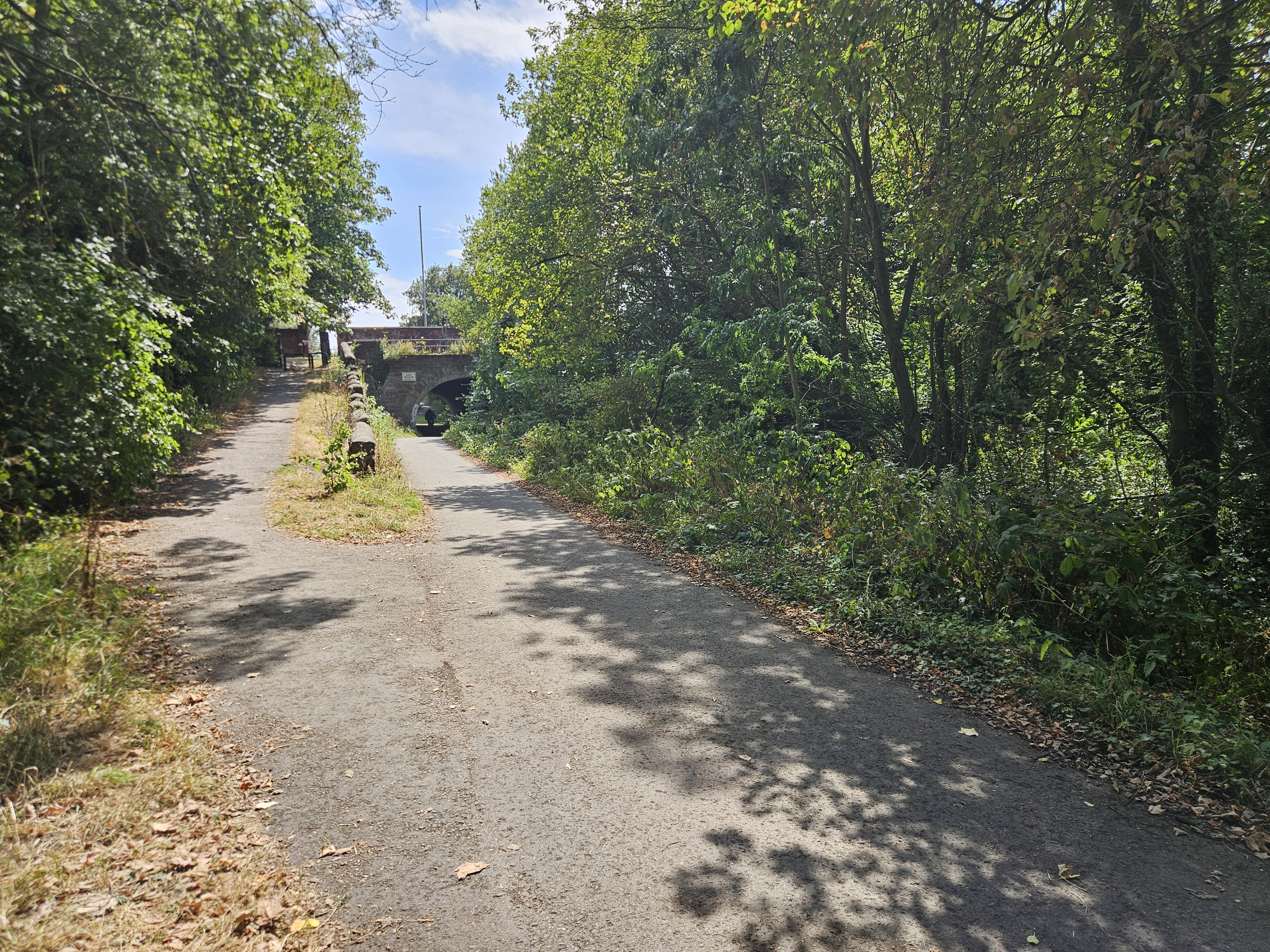
- Southbound from down platform - August 2026

General information
- Location: Knotty Ash, Liverpool; England
- Coordinates: 53.4173°N 2.9014°W
- Grid reference: SJ401915
- Line: North Liverpool Extension Line
- Platforms: 2

Other information
- Status: Disused

History
- Original company: Cheshire Lines Committee
- Pre-grouping: Cheshire Lines Committee
- Post-grouping: Cheshire Lines Committee

Key dates
- 1 December 1879: Station opened to passengers as "Old Swan & Knotty Ash"
- March 1882: Station opened for goods
- 1 November 1888: Station renamed "Knotty Ash & Stanley"
- 7 November 1960: Closed to passengers
- 6 September 1965: Closed to goods, except coal
- 1 May 1972: Closed completely
Location

Knotty Ash & Stanley railway station was located on the North Liverpool Extension Line to the north of the East Prescot Road, Knotty Ash, Liverpool, England.

The station opened in 1879 as "Old Swan & Knotty Ash". It was renamed "Knotty Ash & Stanley" in 1888, but it was always referred to simply as "Knotty Ash" locally. The station nameboards read "Knotty Ash".

It closed to passengers on 7 November 1960, to general goods in 1965 and completely in 1972.

The line through the station was used by freight trains until 1975. The tracks were lifted in early 1979.

By 2015, the trackbed though the station site formed part of the Trans Pennine Trail.

| Preceding station | Disused railways | Following station |
|---|---|---|
| Childwall; Line and station closed | Cheshire Lines Committee; North Liverpool Extension Line | West Derby; Line and station closed |
