= Liverpool Central railway station =

Railway station in Merseyside, England

Liverpool Central
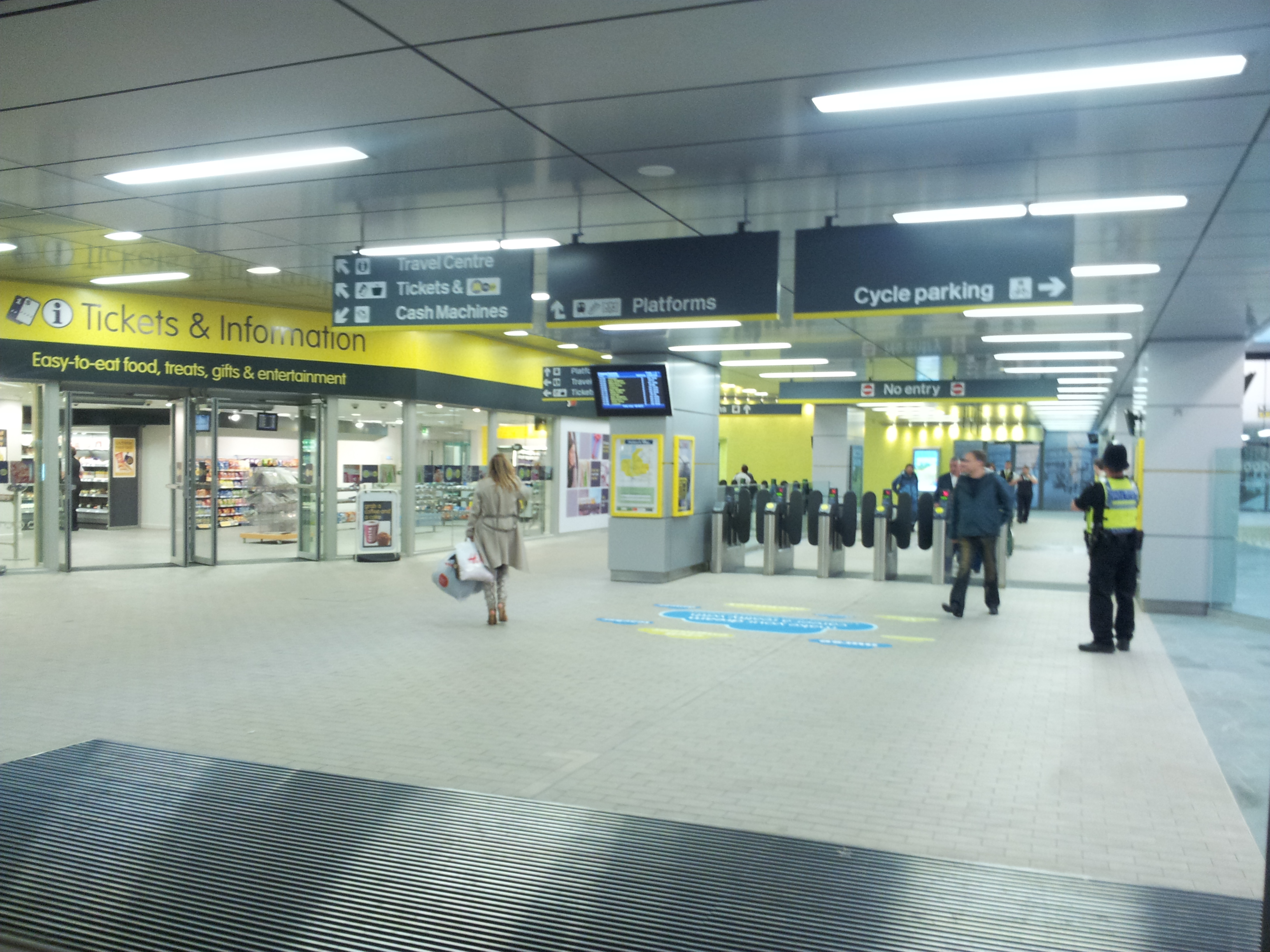
- The concourse

General information
- Location: Liverpool, Merseyside, England
- Coordinates: 53.4045°N 2.9797°W
- Grid reference: SJ349901
- Manager: Merseyrail
- Transit authority: Merseytravel
- Platforms: 3

Other information
- Station code: LVC
- Fare zone: C1
- Classification: DfT category B

Key dates
- 2 March 1874: Opened (High Level)
- 11 January 1892: Opened (Low Level)
- 17 April 1972: Closed (High Level)
- 28 July 1975: Closed (Low Level)
- 9 May 1977: Reopened (Low Level)
- 23 April 2012: Closed (Low Level refurbishment)
- 25 August 2012: Partially reopened (concourse and Wirral line)
- 22 October 2012: Fully reopened

Passengers
- 2021/22: ▲10.747 million
- Interchange: ▲0.391 million
- 2022/23: ▲11.402 million
- Interchange: ▲0.537 million
- 2023/24: ▲12.611 million
- Interchange: ▲0.600 million
- 2024/25: ▲14.820 million
- Interchange: ▲1.018 million
- 2025/26: ▲16.239 million
- Interchange: ▼0.877 million
Location
Notes
- Passenger statistics from the Office of Rail and Road

Liverpool Central railway station in Liverpool, Merseyside, England, forms a central hub of the Merseyrail network, being on both the Northern Line and the Wirral Line. The station is located underground on two levels, below the site of a former main line terminus.

It is the busiest station in the city, although considerably smaller than Liverpool Lime Street, the main line terminus, and the busiest station to operate solely on the Merseyrail network. It is the busiest underground station outside London, serving 40,000 people daily. The station in passengers per platform is the busiest underground railway station in the United Kingdom outside of London; at 3,979,547 passengers per platform per annum, it is tenth out of all stations outside the capital, underground or overground. The main concourse is part of a shopping centre and includes a closed subway link to the former Lewis's department store.

== History ==
=== High Level terminus station ===
The original station, which was a large, above-ground terminal station, opened on 2 March 1874, at the end of the Cheshire Lines Committee (CLC) line to Manchester Central. It replaced Brunswick station as the CLC's Liverpool terminus, becoming the headquarters of the committee. The three-storey building fronted Ranelagh Street in the city centre, with a 65 feet (20 m) high, arched iron and glass train shed behind.

There were six platforms within the station, facilitating journeys to Manchester Central (in 45 minutes, making the route the quickest and most direct between Liverpool and Manchester), London St Pancras, Hull Paragon, Harwich Parkeston Quay, Stockport Tiviot Dale, Southport Lord Street and an alternative London route to that of the Midland Railway, terminating at London Marylebone.

Until the nationalisation of Britain's railways, the station was always busy but it was closed under the Beeching Axe, as the routes served could be taken from nearby Liverpool Lime Street. In 1966, most services on the CLC route were diverted to Lime Street via the Hunts Cross chord, leaving only a dozen urban commuter trains per day to and from Gateacre. These final services were withdrawn on 17 April 1972, with a promise to reinstate the Gateacre route when the Merseyrail network was completed in 1978.

The High Level station was demolished in 1973, having served a short time as a car park, although some former station buildings remained while work was in progress on rebuilding the underground station in the mid-1970s. The area of the train shed now forms the centre of the stalled Central Village development.

=== Underground urban station ===
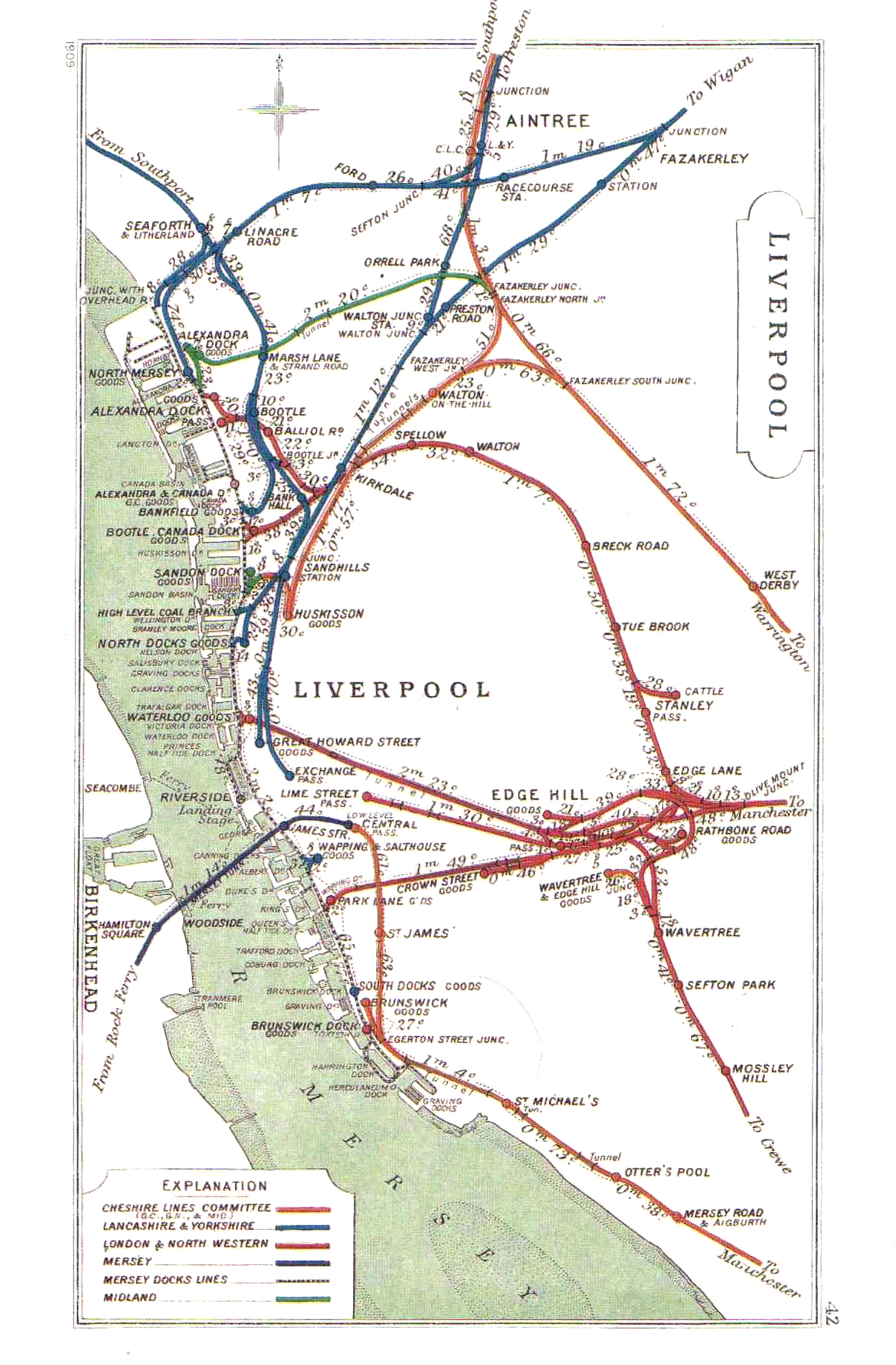
A 1909 Railway Clearing House junction diagram, showing railways in the vicinity of Liverpool Central – Low Level station (Mersey Railway) in purple; High Level station (Cheshire Lines) in orange

Liverpool Central Low Level underground terminal station opened on 11 January 1892, at the end of the Mersey Railway's route, via the Mersey Railway Tunnel from Birkenhead, when the route was extended from Liverpool James Street. The Mersey Railway platforms were underground, accessed from stairs within the High Level station and situated in roughly the same position as the escalators accessing the Northern Line today.

The Mersey Railway tunnel entering Central Low Level from the north of the station was aligned with the High Level station's approach tunnel from the south. This was to ensure minimum engineering work if ever the two tunnels were to be linked up, as did occur in the 1970s.

=== Merseyrail ===
The Merseyrail network was created in the 1970s by merging separate railways into one integrated network. Central underground station would service the Northern and Wirral Lines.

A new loop tunnel was built in Liverpool city centre for Wirral Line trains, linking James Street station with Moorfields, Lime Street and Liverpool Central stations, and returning to James Street. A new deep-level underground platform was built at Liverpool Central as part of this loop tunnel.

The former CLC route was taken underground connecting to the underground Mersey Railway platforms. Another new tunnel, the Link Tunnel, allowed trains to continue northwards via Moorfields to the approach lines to Liverpool Exchange, creating one long line from Hunts Cross to Southport. Liverpool Exchange terminal station was closed in 1977; this route became the Northern Line. The rebuilt underground station was opened by British Rail in the same year.

In the original 1970s Merseyrail plan, southbound trains would have continued to Warrington and Manchester; however, services terminated at Garston, then later extended to Hunts Cross. Simultaneously, works to allow the Northern Line to be connected to the Victoria Tunnel, called the Edge Hill Spur, to connect the eastern section of the city to the city centre underground section were undertaken, then later abandoned. Trains would have operated from Central station to the east of the city and out to St Helens.

=== Refurbishment ===
It was announced in September 2011 that, through a £40 million investment from Network Rail, Liverpool Central was to have a major refurbishment programme to improve the concourse and platforms. Works included new lighting, flooring, new toilet facilities and new escalators to the Northern Line platforms. The entire station closed for refurbishment on 23 April 2012. The station partly reopened on 25 August 2012, with the refurbishment of the main concourse and Wirral Line platform completed. The station fully reopened on 22 October 2012 with the work on the Northern Line platforms completed.

== Facilities ==
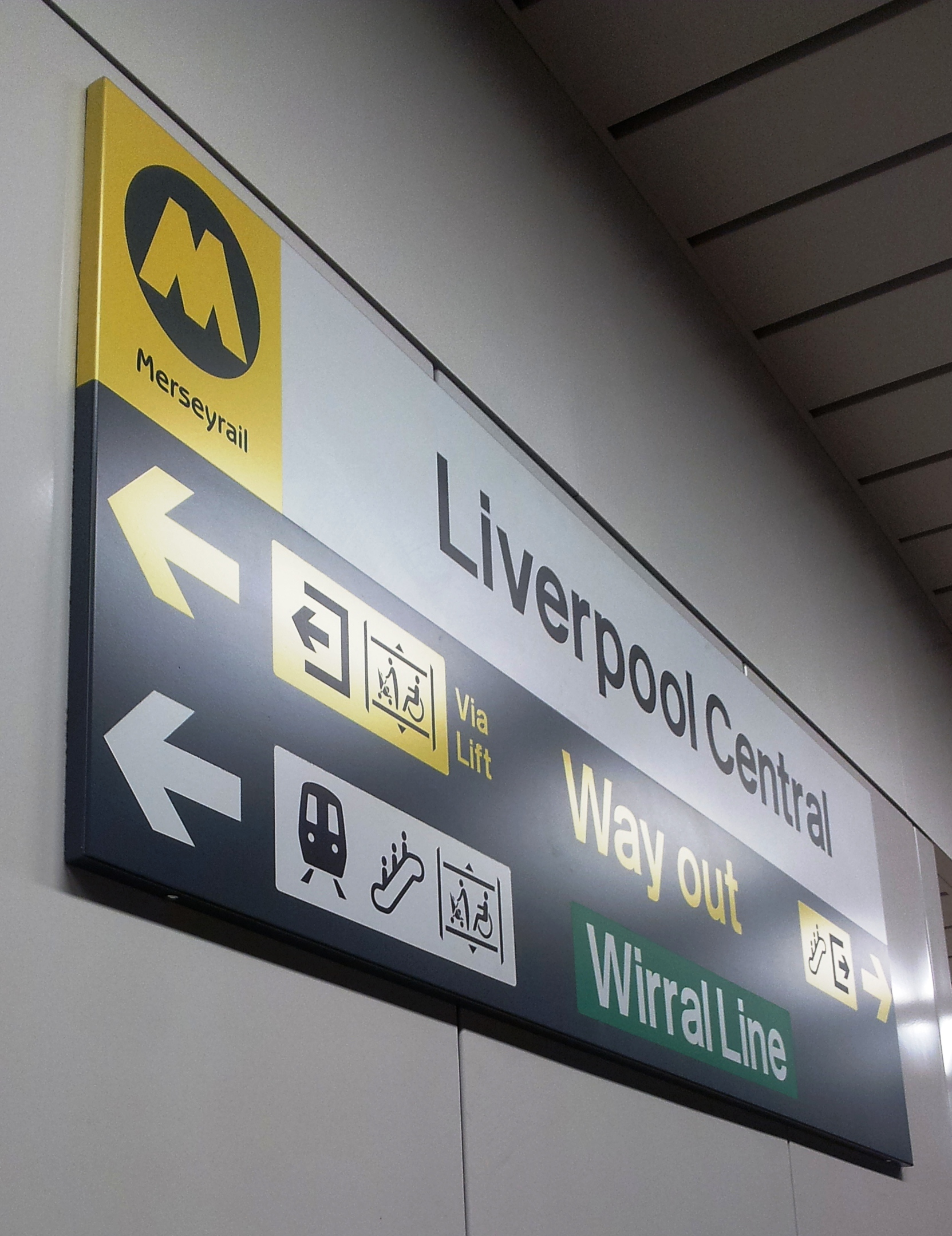
Liverpool Central sign

A street-level travel centre opened in November 2009, replacing the former ticket office and newsagents; this sells tickets, newspapers, food and drink. There are also toilets, cash machines, free wi-fi and food-vending machines. Escalators and lifts lead to the two Northern Line platforms and the deep-level Wirral Line platform. There are cycle racks for 30 cycles and secure storage for 16 cycles.

== Future ==
The Liverpool City Region Long Term Rail Strategy document, produced by Merseytravel in 2014, states that it hopes to re-open the Wapping Tunnel to allow Liverpool Central to connect with Edge Hill and beyond. Merseytravel commissioned a feasibility study into a new rail link between Central and Edge Hill, which was completed in May 2016. The report found that the Wapping Tunnel was in good condition—though suffering from flooding in places and requiring some remedial work—and that the concept of re-opening the tunnel was viable.

Plans were developed in 2006 to build a shopping complex on the site of the car park behind the former High Level station (bounded by the rear of the station, Cropper Street, Newington and Bold Street). Known as Central Village, it was to consist of a high-rise tower for residential and business use, retail outlets, bars and restaurants and was also to have a canal running the length of Bold Street. Development of the site was troubled, with delays caused by parties involved going into receivership and potential tenants pulling out. In September 2017, new owner Augur announced plans to develop the site while leaving space for the expansion of the station, potentially seeing new platforms built. Augur stated it had discussed its plans with Network Rail and Liverpool City Council, and hoped to have planning permission submitted during 2018.

Network Rail was scheduled to install an extra lift giving access to the Northern Line platforms in 2016/17. No work had begun by the end of 2016; the Transport Minister, Paul Maynard, confirmed that owing to funding issues, work would not start until 2019 at the earliest. In 2022, the Liverpool City Region Combined Authority announced that the installation of this new lift was scheduled to begin in 2023, and the lift is currently installed & in service.

The Liverpool Echo published an article in October 2018, which claimed that unless the station was redeveloped to increase capacity then it would be facing restrictions on passenger movement. Merseyrail managing director Andy Heath suggested that by the mid-2020s, passengers could end up having to queue upstairs as the platforms would have insufficient capacity. Merseyrail chairman Cllr Liam Robinson stated that, due to the potential size of the works, Merseytravel were in discussions with the government over their plans to expand the station. Plans could include a new concourse and new platforms as well as making use of a previously constructed but unused tunnel portal to the east of the underground station.

== Services ==
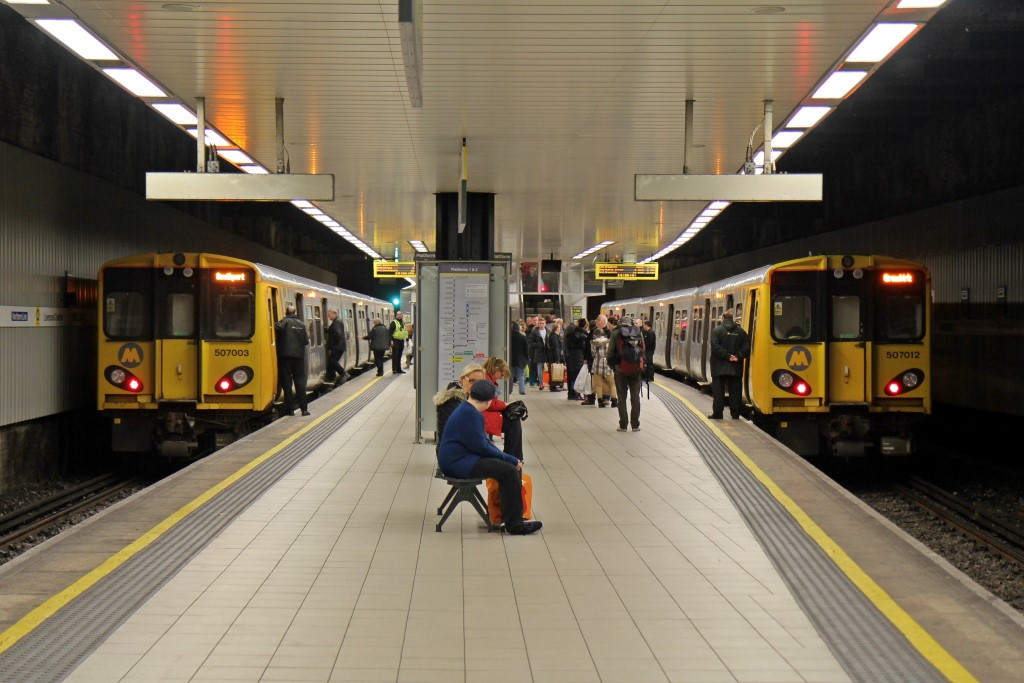
The Northern Line platforms

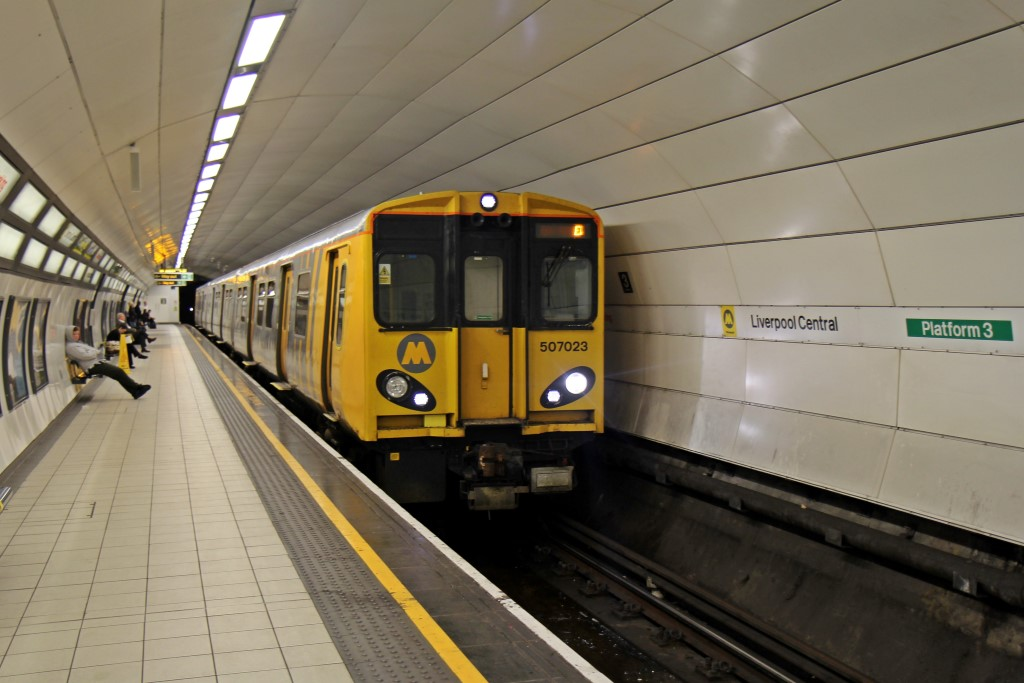
Wirral Line platform

Both lines on the Merseyrail network serve the station, with general off-peak service levels as follows, in trains per hour (tph):

Northern Line:

- 4 tph to Southport
- 4 tph to Ormskirk
- 4 tph to Headbolt Lane
- 4 tph to Hunts Cross, via Liverpool South Parkway.

On Sundays, frequencies are reduced to 2 tph on all routes.

Wirral Line:

- 4 tph to New Brighton
- 4 tph to West Kirby
- 4 tph to Chester
- 2 tph to Ellesmere Port.

During the evening and on Sundays, frequencies are reduced to 2 tph on all routes. These services are all provided by Merseyrail's fleet of Class 777 electric multiple units.

Northern Line services use platforms 1 and 2; trains to Headbolt Lane and Hunts Cross normally depart from platform 1, and trains to Southport and Ormskirk use platform 2. All Wirral Line services depart from platform 3.

Empty coaching stock services have to reverse at Liverpool Central station, when going from Kirkdale Depot to Birkenhead North TMD and vice versa, making use of a single track chord known as the Stock Interchange Line linking Liverpool James Street station (Wirral Line) and Liverpool Central (Northern Line). This was the route taken by Wirral Line trains between Central L.L & James Street prior to the building of the Link & Loop tunnels in the 1970s.

Preceding station	National Rail	Following station
Moorfields towards Southport, Ormskirk or Headbolt Lane	Merseyrail; Northern Line; Hunts Cross - Ormskirk	Brunswick towards Hunts Cross
Moorfields towards Southport, Ormskirk or Headbolt Lane	Merseyrail; Northern Line; Liverpool - Southport / Headbolt Lane	Terminus
Liverpool Lime Street (one-way operation)	Merseyrail; Wirral Line	James Street towards New Brighton, West Kirby, Chester or Ellesmere Port

== See also ==
- List of underground stations of the Merseyrail network
