= Warbreck railway station =

Former railway station on the North Liverpool Extension Line in Liverpool, England

Warbreck
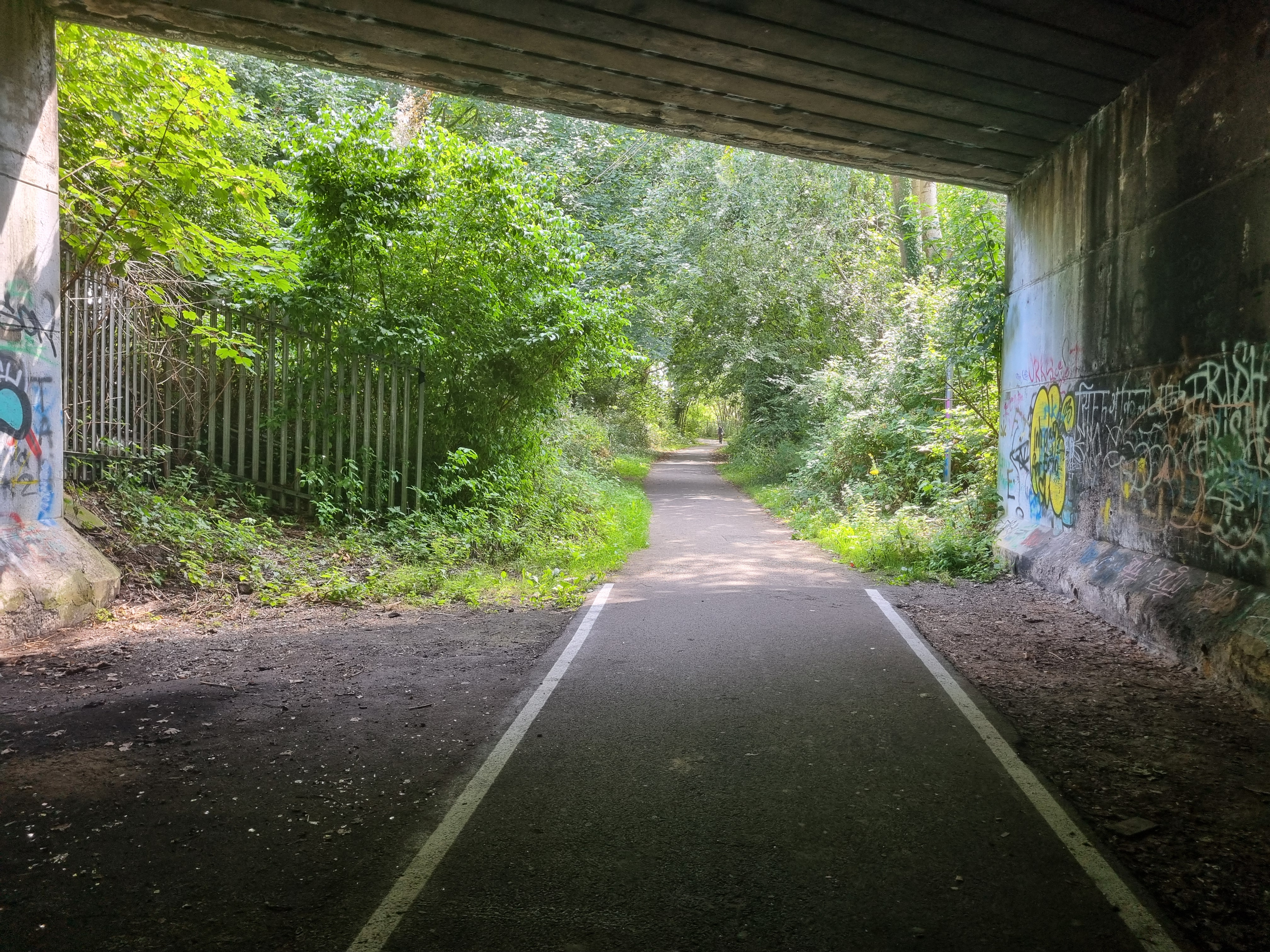
- Looking south from the underpass, July 2024

General information
- Location: Walton, Liverpool; England
- Coordinates: 53.4632°N 2.9579°W
- Grid reference: SJ364967
- Line: North Liverpool Extension Line
- Platforms: 2

Other information
- Status: Disused

History
- Original company: Cheshire Lines Committee
- Post-grouping: Cheshire Lines Committee

Key dates
- 1 August 1929: Station opened
- 7 November 1960: Station closed
Location

Warbreck railway station was on the North Liverpool Extension Line to the south of Walton Vale, Liverpool, England.

The purely passenger station opened on 1 August 1929 and closed on 7 November 1960. The through tracks were not lifted until 1980.

Preceding station	Disused railways	Following station
Clubmoor; Line and station closed	Cheshire Lines Committee; North Liverpool Extension Line Mainline	Aintree Central; Line and station closed
Walton on the Hill; Line and station closed	Cheshire Lines Committee; North Liverpool Extension Line Dock Branch	Aintree Central; Line and station closed
