= Clubmoor railway station =

Former railway station on the North Liverpool Extension Line in Liverpool, England

Clubmoor

General information
- Location: Norris Green, Liverpool; England
- Coordinates: 53.4403°N 2.9297°W
- Grid reference: SJ383941
- Line: North Liverpool Extension Line
- Platforms: 2

Other information
- Status: Disused

History
- Original company: Cheshire Lines Committee
- Post-grouping: Cheshire Lines Committee

Key dates
- 14 April 1927: Station opened
- 7 November 1960: Station closed
Location

Clubmoor railway station was located on the North Liverpool Extension Line at Broad Lane, Norris Green, Liverpool, England.

The passengers only station opened on 14 April 1927 as part of the Cheshire line link from Halewood to Southport. It closed on 7 November 1960.

The tracks through the station continued to be used by freight trains until 1975. They were lifted in early 1979.

Today the wall at the main entrance on the west side of the line and remnants of station platforms and fence posts survive. The base of the waiting shelters can also be seen. The trackbed now forms part of the Trans Pennine Trail which runs from Kingston upon Hull to Southport.

Preceding station	Disused railways	Following station
West Derby; Line and station closed	Cheshire Lines Committee; North Liverpool Extension Line Dock Branch	Walton on the Hill; Line and station closed
West Derby; Line and station closed	Cheshire Lines Committee; North Liverpool Extension Line North Branch	Warbreck; Line and station closed
