= Walton on the Hill railway station =

Former railway station on the North Liverpool Extension Line in Liverpool, England

Walton on the Hill

General information
- Location: Walton, Liverpool; England
- Coordinates: 53.4479°N 2.9651°W
- Grid reference: SJ360951
- Line: North Liverpool Extension Line
- Platforms: 2

Other information
- Status: Disused

History
- Original company: Cheshire Lines Committee
- Pre-grouping: Cheshire Lines Committee

Key dates
- 1 December 1879: Station opened
- 1 January 1918: Station closed to passengers
- 9 September 1968: Station closed completely
Location

Walton on the Hill railway station was located on the Huskisson branch of the North Liverpool Extension Line at the junction of Rice Lane and Queens Drive in Walton, Liverpool, England.

The station opened on 1 December 1879. It closed to passengers on 1 January 1918 but continued as a public goods station for a further fifty years, closing completely on 9 September 1968. The through tracks were not lifted until 1980.

Preceding station	Disused railways	Following station
Clubmoor; Line and station closed	Cheshire Lines Committee; North Liverpool Extension Line Dock Branch	Huskisson; Line and station closed
Warbreck; Line and station closed	Cheshire Lines Committee; North Liverpool Extension Line North Branch	Huskisson; Line and station closed
