= Huskisson railway station =

Former railway station in England

Huskisson

General information
- Location: Kirkdale, Liverpool; England
- Coordinates: 53.4257°N 2.9908°W
- Grid reference: SJ342926
- Line: North Liverpool Extension Line
- Platforms: 3

Other information
- Status: Disused

History
- Original company: Cheshire Lines Committee
- Pre-grouping: Cheshire Lines Committee

Key dates
- 1 July 1880: Station opened for goods
- 13 July 1880: Station opened for Aintree race traffic
- 2 August 1880: Station opened for passengers
- 1 May 1885: Station closed for passengers
- August 1975: Station closed completely
Location

Huskisson railway station was located on the North Liverpool Extension Line near Huskisson Dock in Liverpool, England.

The station opened in 1880 and closed to passenger traffic as early as July 1885. The site was within Huskisson Goods Yards and continued in use as a freight depot until 1975. It was the terminus of the branch.

An enthusiasts' railtour visited the station on 13 June 1964.

Preceding station	Disused railways	Following station
Walton on the Hill; Line and station closed	Cheshire Lines Committee; North Liverpool Extension Line	Terminus
