= West Derby railway station =

Disused railway station in Merseyside, England

West Derby
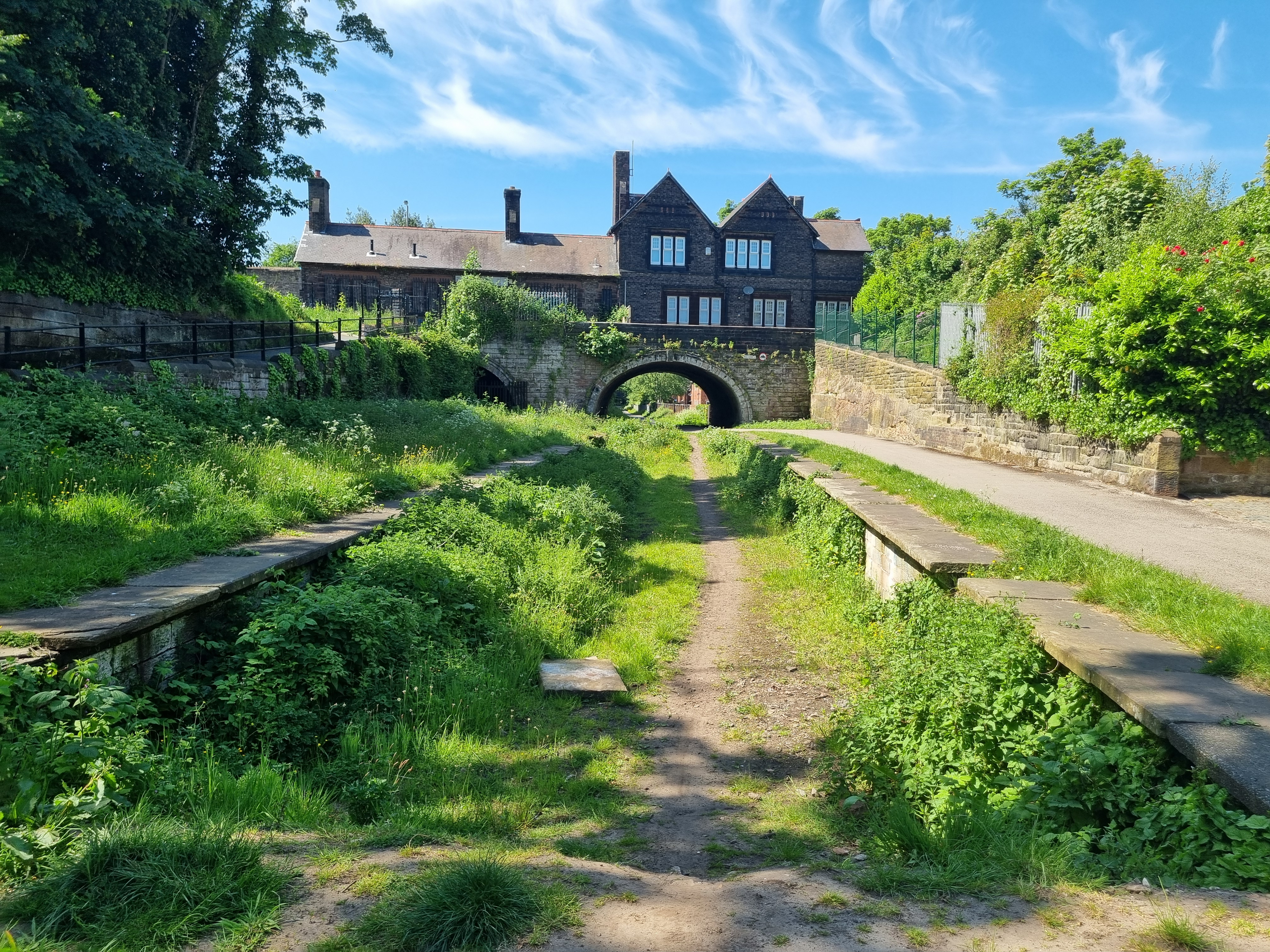
- West Derby railway station in 2024

General information
- Location: West Derby, Liverpool; England
- Coordinates: 53.4288°N 2.9122°W
- Grid reference: SJ395928
- Line: North Liverpool Extension Line
- Platforms: 2

Other information
- Status: Disused

History
- Original company: Cheshire Lines Committee
- Pre-grouping: Cheshire Lines Committee
- Post-grouping: Cheshire Lines Committee

Key dates
- 1 December 1879: Station opened to passengers
- March 1882: Station opened to goods
- 7 November 1960: Station closed to passengers
- 1 June 1964: Station closed completely
Location

West Derby railway station was located on the North Liverpool Extension Line to the south of Mill Lane, West Derby, Liverpool, England.

== History ==
The station opened on 1 December 1879. It was located about 2 miles away from Croxteth Hall, which was the home of Lord Sefton.

The station closed to passengers in November 1960 and completely five years later. The line through the station site continued in use by freight trains until 1975, with the tracks being lifted in early 1979.

Preceding station	Disused railways	Following station
Knotty Ash & Stanley	Cheshire Lines Committee; North Liverpool Extension Line	Clubmoor

== The site today ==
The platforms remain extant, with the station building converted to a private residence and shop. The trackbed through the station site forms the Liverpool Loopline Path, part of the Trans Pennine Trail.
