= Liverpool Central High Level railway station =

Former railway station in Liverpool, England

Liverpool Central
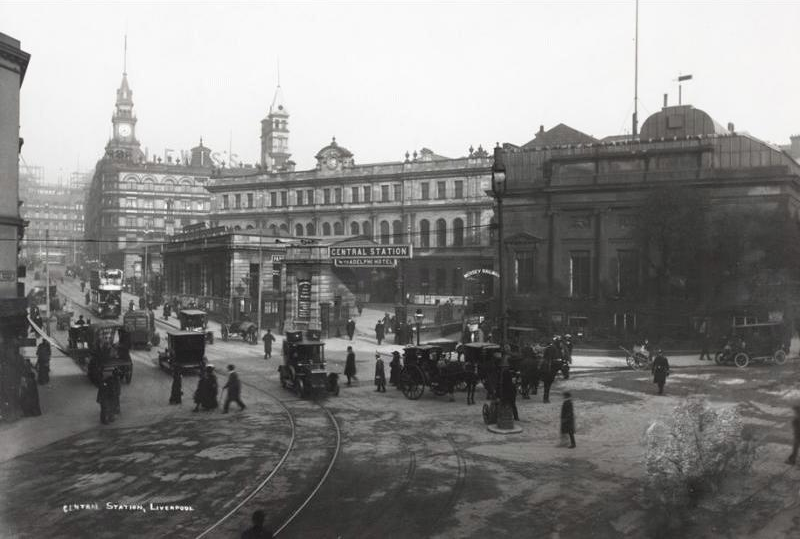

General information
- Location: Liverpool, Liverpool; England
- Coordinates: 53.4046°N 2.9802°W
- Grid reference: SJ350902
- Platforms: 6

Other information
- Status: Disused

History
- Original company: Cheshire Lines Committee
- Pre-grouping: Cheshire Lines Committee
- Post-grouping: Cheshire Lines Committee

Key dates
- 1 March 1874: Station opened
- 17 April 1972: Station closed
Location

Liverpool Central High Level was a terminus railway station in central Liverpool, England. It opened on 1 March 1874, at the western end of the Cheshire Lines Committee (CLC) line to Manchester Central. It replaced Brunswick as the CLC's Liverpool passenger terminus, becoming the headquarters of the committee.

== History ==
A three-storey building fronted Ranelagh Street in Liverpool city centre, with a 65-foot (20 m) high, arched shed behind. There were six platforms within the station, offering journeys to Manchester Central, London St. Pancras, Hull, Harwich, Stockport Tiviot Dale, Southport Lord Street and an alternative route to that of the Midland Railway terminating at London Marylebone. The journey to Manchester Central took 45 mins, making the route quicker and more direct than those of the competing Lancashire & Yorkshire Railway and London & North Western Railway.

On 11 January 1892, Liverpool Central Low Level underground station opened at the end of the Mersey Railway's route, via the Mersey Railway Tunnel from Birkenhead. The tunnel was extended from James Street to Central. The Mersey Railway platforms were underground, accessed from stairs within the station; these stairs were situated in roughly the same position as the escalators accessing the Merseyrail Northern Line today.

The station was always busy, until nationalisation. Route closures that were part of the Beeching Axe in the 1960s closed three terminal stations: Liverpool Central High Level, Liverpool Exchange and Woodside Station in Birkenhead.

- Long and medium distance routes – Lime Street Station in Liverpool city centre was to remain, absorbing the long-to-medium-distance passenger traffic of the closed terminal stations.
- Local urban routes – The local urban services served by the terminal stations would be absorbed by the new Merseyrail urban network.

New tunnels under Liverpool's city centre were scheduled to connect all the separate rail lines to create Merseyrail.

In 1966, most services on the CLC route were diverted to Lime Street via the Hunts Cross chord, leaving only a dozen urban commuter trains per day to and from the terminus at Gateacre. These final services were withdrawn on 17 April 1972, with the High Level part of the station closed that day; it was later demolished, after having served briefly as a car park. However, the Low Level underground station remains open.

The site was being developed into Central Village, building over the underground station; however, in 2017, new owners Augur announced that they planned to develop the site into a mixed retail and leisure development known as 'Circus'.

== Layout ==
The station had six platforms, arranged over three islands. The island that formed platforms 1 and 2 was especially wide to allow vehicles to drive down the middle. Run-around loops were present between platforms 2 and 3; platforms 4 and 5; and east of platform 6.

| Preceding station | Disused railways | Following station |
|---|---|---|
| Terminus | Cheshire Lines Committee | St James; Line and station closed |
