= Langton Dock Branch =

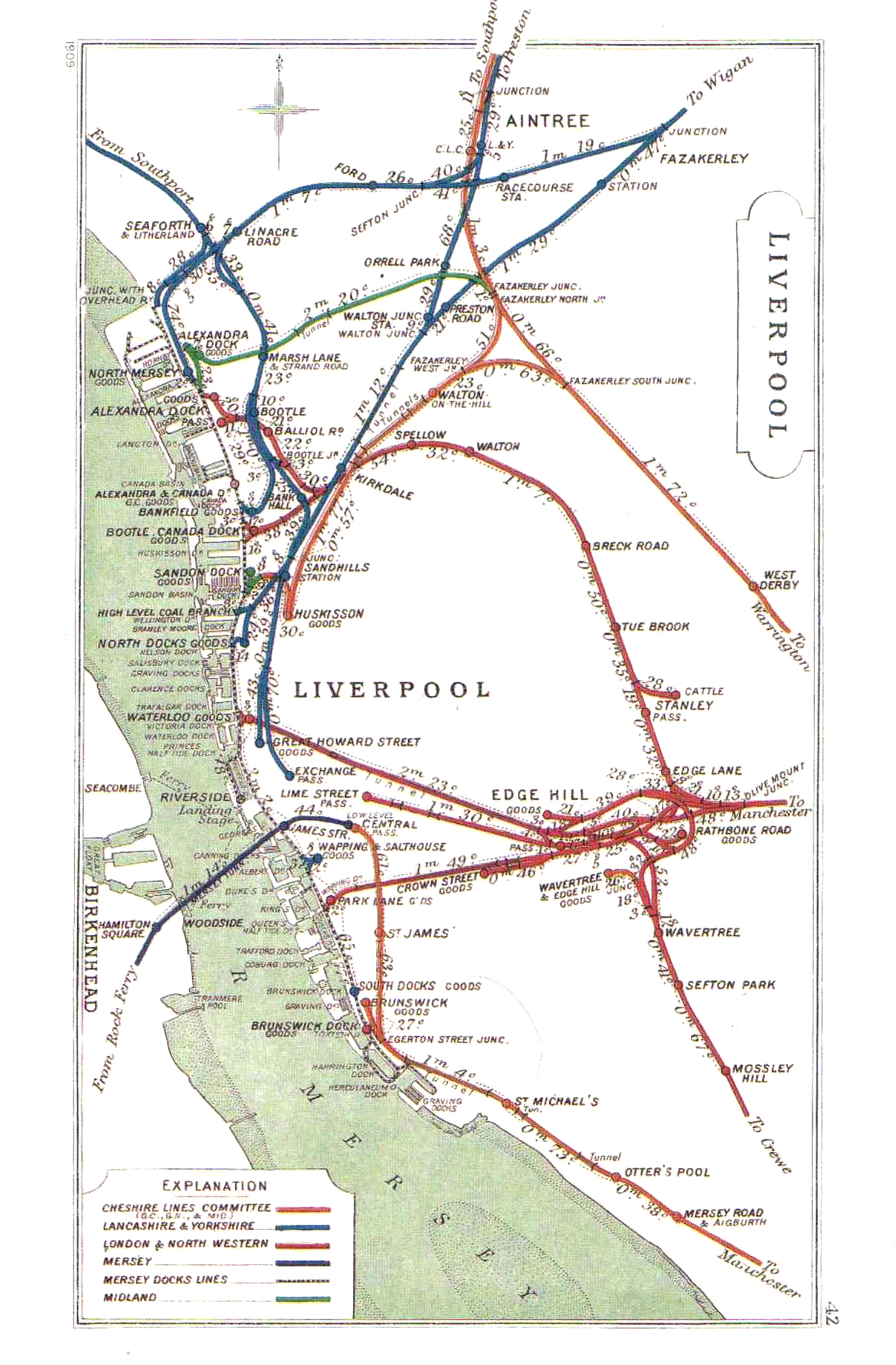
A 1909 map showing the branch

The Langton Branch was built in 1885 by the Midland Railway. This branch went from the Cheshire Lines Committee's North Liverpool Extension Line at Fazakerley Junction to Langton Goods station, with a spur to North Mersey Goods. A second short spur, the Linacre Gas Works Branch, which was added later, ran from the Langton Branch Junction.

== Route ==
- Fazakerley Junction on North Liverpool Extension Line.
- Langton Branch Junction to Lancashire Tar Distillers Siding and Linacre Branch (Linacre Gas Works Branch)(LGW)
- Langton Goods.
- North Mersey Goods high level.

== Closure ==
It was taken out of service 26 April 1968 and the lines were removed by August 1969. The line from Langton Goods to North Mersey Goods was used until July 1970.
