= Hunts Cross chord =

Section of railway track in Liverpool, England

Coordinates: 53.35721°N 2.88597°W

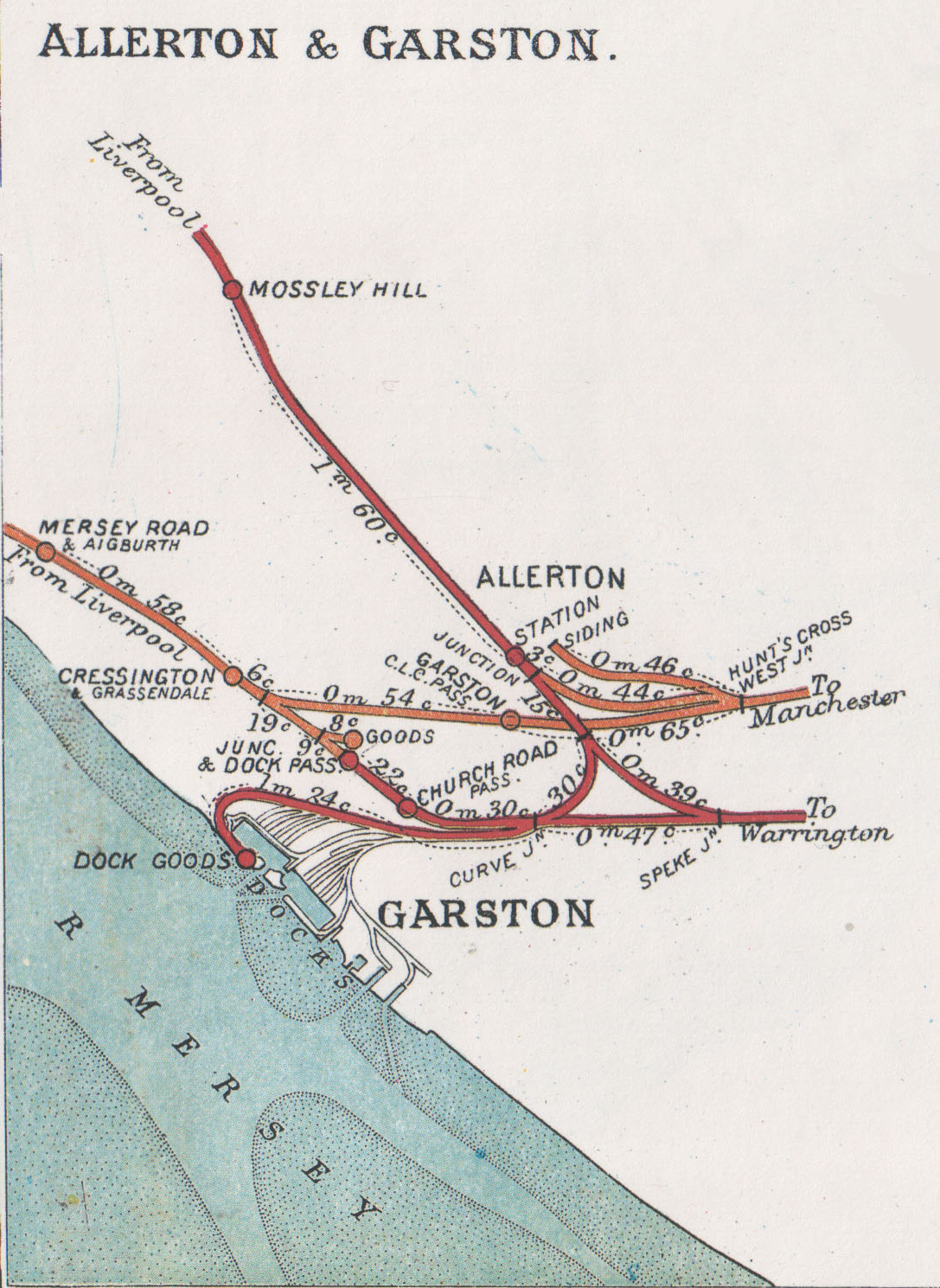
Junctions around Garston, 1913. Garston and Liverpool in orange, L&NWR in red

Hunts Cross chord is a section of railway track in Liverpool that was built by the Cheshire Lines Committee (CLC) to connect the LNWR's Edge Hill to Ditton Junction line with the CLC's Liverpool to Manchester Line. Mainline services between Manchester and Liverpool were diverted to Lime Street from their previous terminus at Central High Level over this connection from 5 September 1966.

Train operating companies using the chord are East Midlands Railway and Northern for services between Liverpool Lime Street and Manchester Piccadilly along the CLC route. TransPennine Express used this route until May 2018, when trains were rerouted via Newton-le-Willows.
