= Shore Road Goods railway station =

Former railway goods terminal in Birkenhead, England, which is currently for let

Shore Road Goods
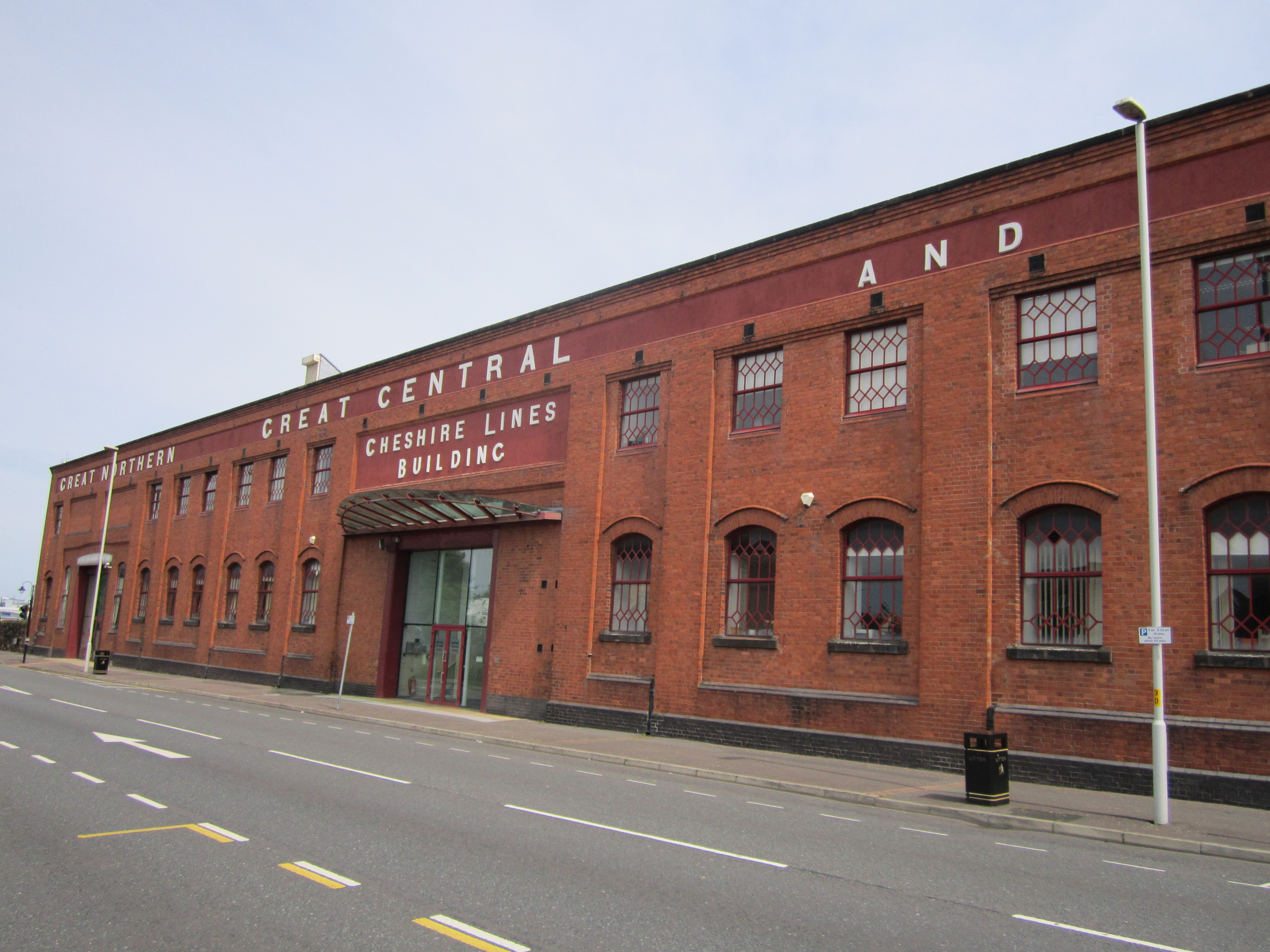
- The Cheshire Lines Building, formerly Shore Road Goods station

General information
- Location: Birkenhead, Wirral; England
- Coordinates: 53.3961°N 3.0141°W
- Grid reference: SJ326893

Other information
- Status: Disused

History
- Original company: Cheshire Lines Committee
- Pre-grouping: Cheshire Lines Committee
- Post-grouping: Cheshire Lines Committee

Key dates
- c.1884-1888: Opened
- c.1961: Closed

Shore Road Goods was a goods terminus in Birkenhead, England. The goods station was situated near to Morpeth Dock, on the Birkenhead Dock Branch railway line, and operated by the Cheshire Lines Committee. The CLC was granted permission to run two locomotives on the dock lines from 13 March 1884. The engine shed, which adjoined the goods station, was opened in 1888 and closed in 1961. The main building of the goods station is still in existence, currently being for let and was in use until 2024 as an office for Wirral Metropolitan Borough Council's archives service.

Preceding station	Disused railways	Following station
Rock Ferry	Birkenhead Railway; Birkenhead Dock Branch	Terminus
