= Childwall railway station =

Former railway station in England

Childwall
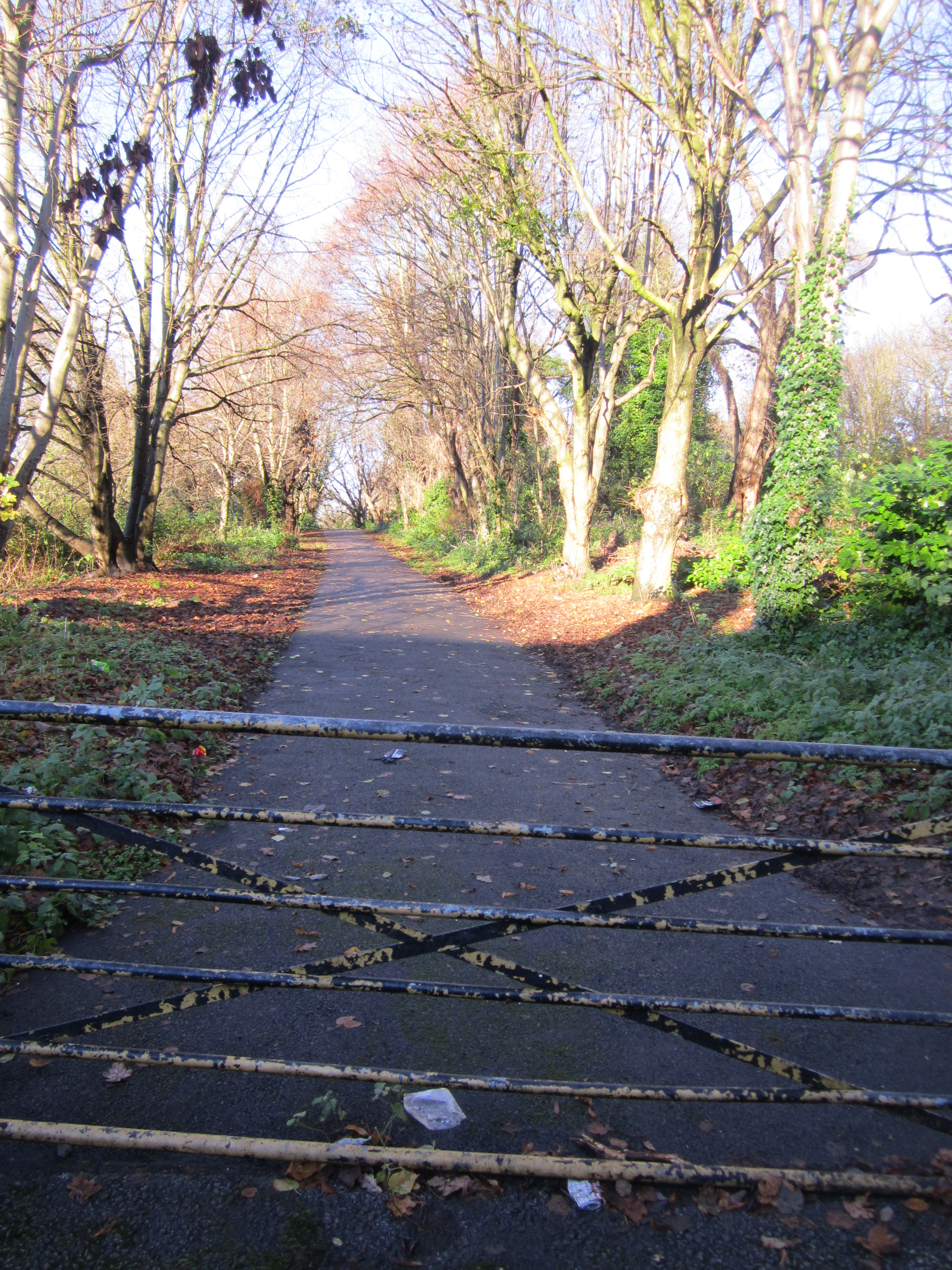
- Liverpool Loop Line at Well Lane, Childwall

General information
- Location: Childwall, Liverpool; England
- Coordinates: 53.3973°N 2.8767°W
- Grid reference: SJ418893
- Line: North Liverpool Extension Line
- Platforms: 2

Other information
- Status: Disused

History
- Original company: Cheshire Lines Committee
- Pre-grouping: Cheshire Lines Committee
- Post-grouping: Cheshire Lines Committee

Key dates
- 1 December 1879: Opened to passengers
- 1882: Opened for goods
- 1 January 1931: Closed to passengers
- 6 August 1943: Closed completely
Location

Childwall railway station was a station located on the North Liverpool Extension Line at Well Lane, Childwall, Liverpool. It opened on 1 December 1879.

The station was distant from the village of Childwall. Passenger services ended in 1931 while it was still a village. The tracks were lifted in early 1979 when Childwall was a suburb of Liverpool with a large population.

== History ==
Childwall railway station was situated on the Cheshire Lines Railway (CLC) North Liverpool Extension Line that connected the CLC Liverpool and Manchester line. The station opened on 1 December 1879 and took its name from the village which was east of the station. The station was on an embankment on the north side of Well Lane; it had a goods yard with one siding. Childwall station closed for passenger service on 1 January 1931, though it remained open for goods until August 1943. After it was fully closed, the station house was demolished.

By 2015 the trackbed though the station site formed part of the Trans Pennine Trail.

Preceding station	Disused railways	Following station
Gateacre; Line and station closed	Cheshire Lines Committee; North Liverpool Extension Line	Knotty Ash & Stanley; Line and station closed
