= Gateacre railway station =

Former railway station in England

Gateacre

General information
- Location: Gateacre, Liverpool; England
- Coordinates: 53.3846°N 2.8599°W
- Grid reference: SJ429879
- Line: North Liverpool Extension Line
- Platforms: 2

Other information
- Status: Disused

History
- Original company: Cheshire Lines Committee
- Pre-grouping: Cheshire Lines Committee
- Post-grouping: Cheshire Lines Committee

Key dates
- 1 December 1879: Station opened to passengers as "Gateacre (for Woolton)"
- March 1882: Opened for goods
- 4 December 1965: Closed for goods
- 15 April 1972: Closed completely
Location

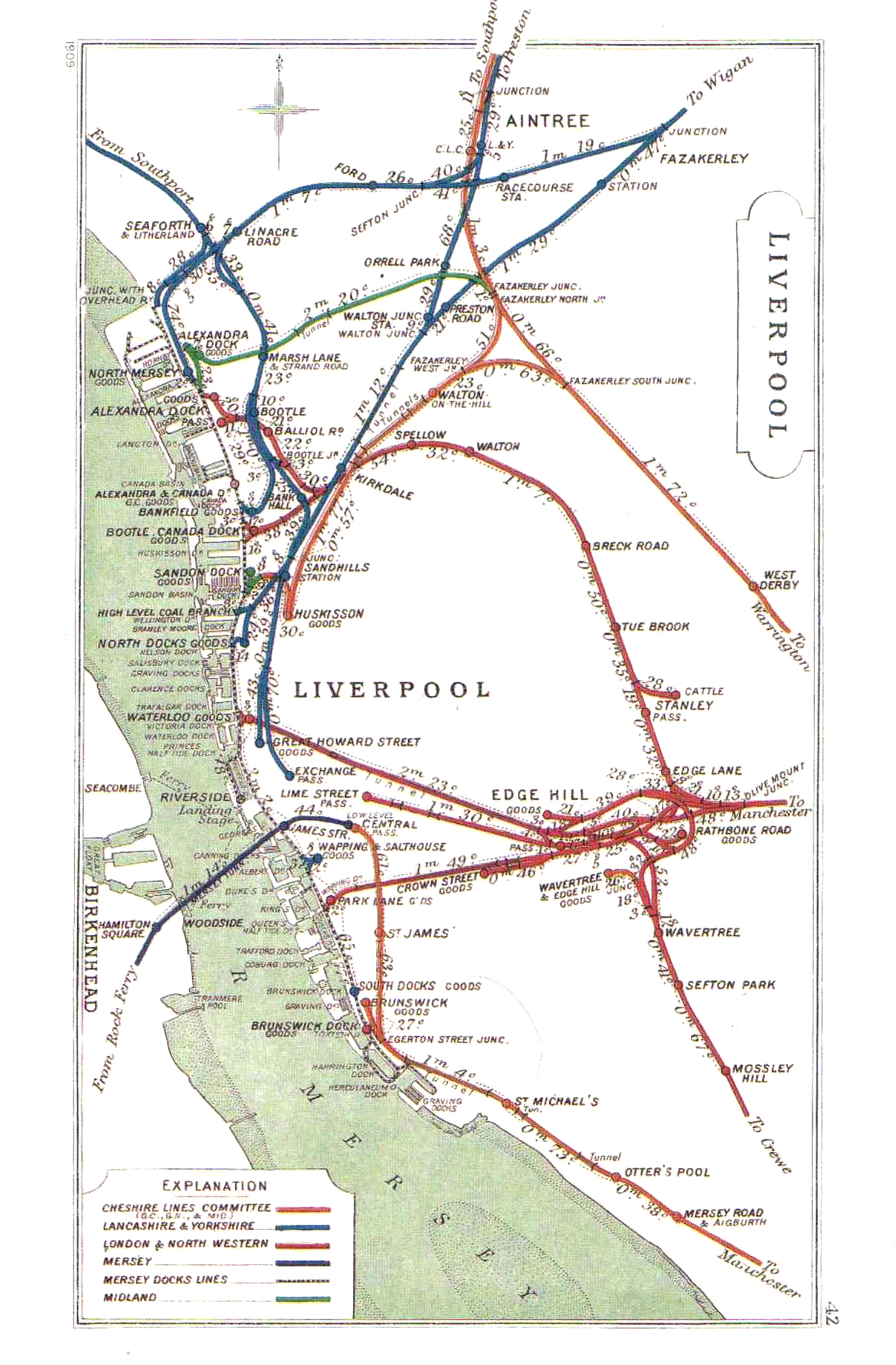
A 1909 Map showing the line which is the red line to the right running south-east to north-west

Gateacre (for Woolton) railway station was located on the North Liverpool Extension Line on the north side of Belle Vale Road, Gateacre, Liverpool, England. Next door was the Black Bull public house which still stands.

Official maps, tickets, timetables, a large exterior station sign and platform nameboards variously refer to the station as "Gateacre", "Gateacre, for Woolton", "Gateacre for Woolton" and "Gateacre & Woolton". "Gateacre" is pronounced "Gattiker."

The station had outlived those on the same line north of Aintree by twenty years and all the remainder by twelve years when it closed to passengers on 15 April 1972. It had latterly been the suburban terminus of the sole residual service from Liverpool Central (High Level). It was planned that the station would reopen as the southern terminus of Merseyrail's Northern Line. This never occurred, with Hunts Cross becoming the terminus. The tracks through the station site were used for freight trains to Liverpool Docks until 1975. They were lifted in early 1979.

By 2015 the trackbed though the station site formed part of the Trans Pennine Trail.

Preceding station	Disused railways	Following station
Hunts Cross; Line closed, station open	Cheshire Lines Committee; North Liverpool Extension Line	Childwall; Line and station closed
Halewood; Line closed, station open	Cheshire Lines Committee; North Liverpool Extension Line	Childwall; Line and station closed
