= North Liverpool Extension Line =

Former railway line in Liverpool, England

Overview
- Locale: Merseyside

History
- Opened: 1879
- Closed: 1972

Technical
- Track gauge: 4 ft 8 1/2 in (1,435 mm) standard gauge

The North Liverpool Extension Line was a railway line in Liverpool, England in operation between 1879 and 1972. It was at one stage intended to become the eastern section of the Merseyrail Outer Loop, an orbital line circling the city.

== History ==
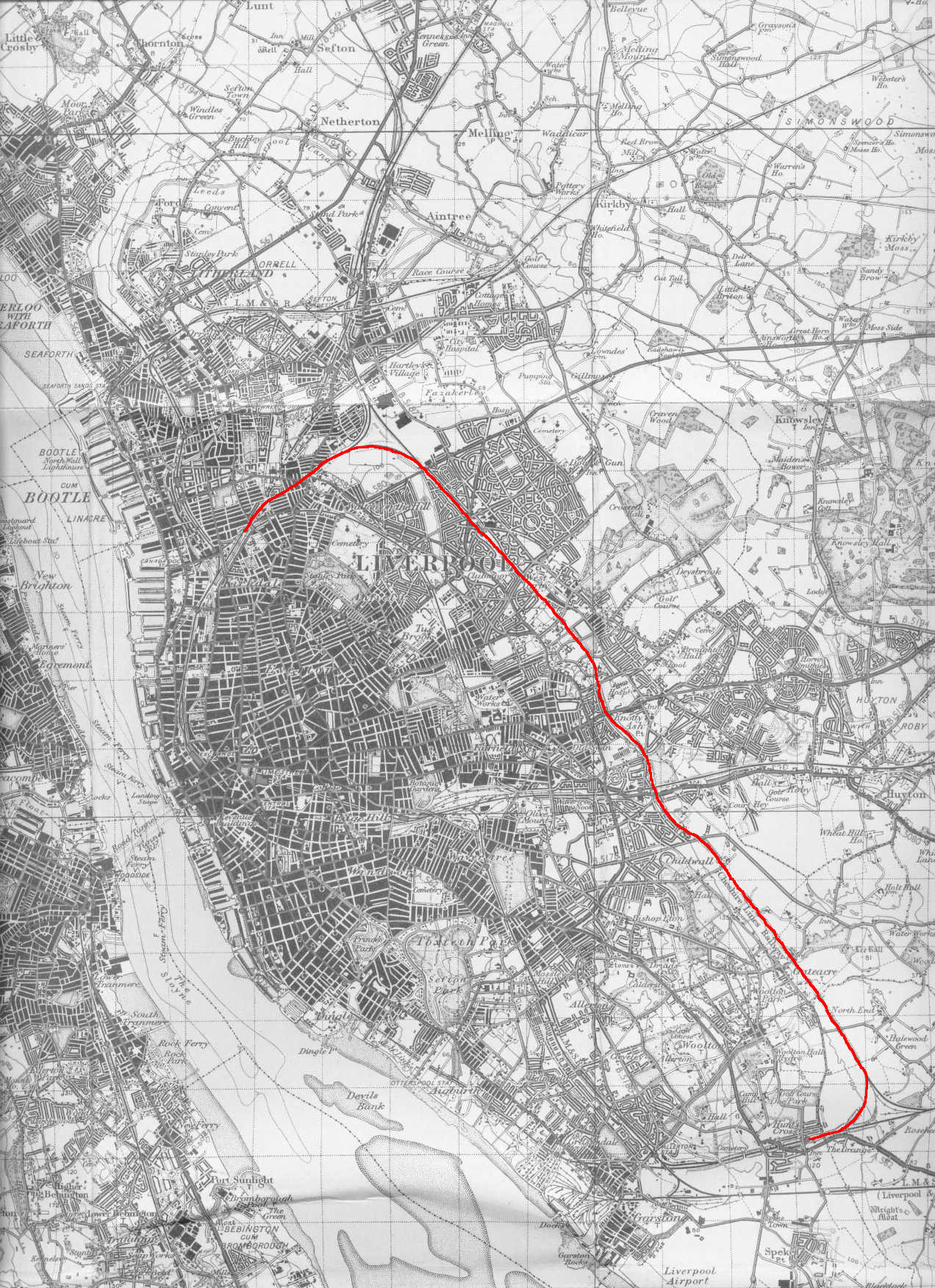
A 1947 map annotated to highlight the North Liverpool Extension Line main line (Hunts Cross to Huskisson) in red (part of the Southport branch is also visible)

The line was built by the Cheshire Lines Committee, branching from the Committee's Liverpool to Manchester line at Hunts Cross in the south of the city, running north skirting the eastern edge of Liverpool, finally arriving at the Walton Triangle junction. One line continued north to Aintree, another curved west through the Rice Lane to Kirkdale tunnel which brought the line facing south, towards Liverpool Docks. The line ran alongside the already existing LYR line before terminating at Huskisson railway station, just after Sandhills railway station. A small line left Huskisson, retracing the route northward before turning towards the river and the Midland Railway's Sandon and Canada Dock Goods station. The line opened between 1879 and 1880.

The Aintree branch was extended to Southport in 1884. The Cheshire Lines Committee put forward several plans to connect railway lines to Liverpool Docks via the extension. One of these was the Liverpool, St Helens & South Lancashire Railway.

=== Operations ===
- Hunts Cross junction with CLC Liverpool to Manchester line.
- Gateacre 1 December 1879 – 15 April 1972.
- Childwall 1 December 1879 – 1 January 1931.
- Knotty Ash & Stanley 1 December 1879 – 7 November 1960.
- West Derby 1 December 1879 – 7 November 1960.
- Clubmoor 14 April 1927 – 7 November 1960.
- Fazakerley South Junction.
- Fazakerley West Junction.
- Walton on the Hill Walton 1 December 1879 – 1 January 1918.
- Walton Tunnel No 41 (240 yd)
- Walton Tunnel No 42 (643 yd)
- Walton Tunnel No 43 (249 yd)
- Huskisson 13 July 1880 – 1 May 1886.

=== North branch ===
- Fazakerley South Junction.
- Fazakerley North Junction.
- Fazakerley Junction with the Midland Railway's Langton Dock Branch.
- Warbreck 1 August 1929 – 7 November 1960.
- Aintree Central, Aintree 13 July 1880 – 7 November 1960.
- Southport Junction
- Southport & Cheshire Lines Extension Railway

== Demise ==
The route was closed in stages over the next 20 years, first passengers services were withdrawn followed by freight. The first section closed to passengers was between Aintree and Gateacre in 1960.

This was followed by passenger trains from Liverpool Central High Level to Gateacre in 1972. Although the Gateacre service was proposed to be reinstated in 1978, with the station becoming a terminus on the new Merseyrail Northern Line, this never happened. Instead Hunts Cross became the southern terminus of the Northern Line.

Although all passengers services were withdrawn, the line continued to carry freight to and from Liverpool docks through the mid seventies. In 1977, the entire line was closed and the track lifted by 1979.

== Planned reopening ==
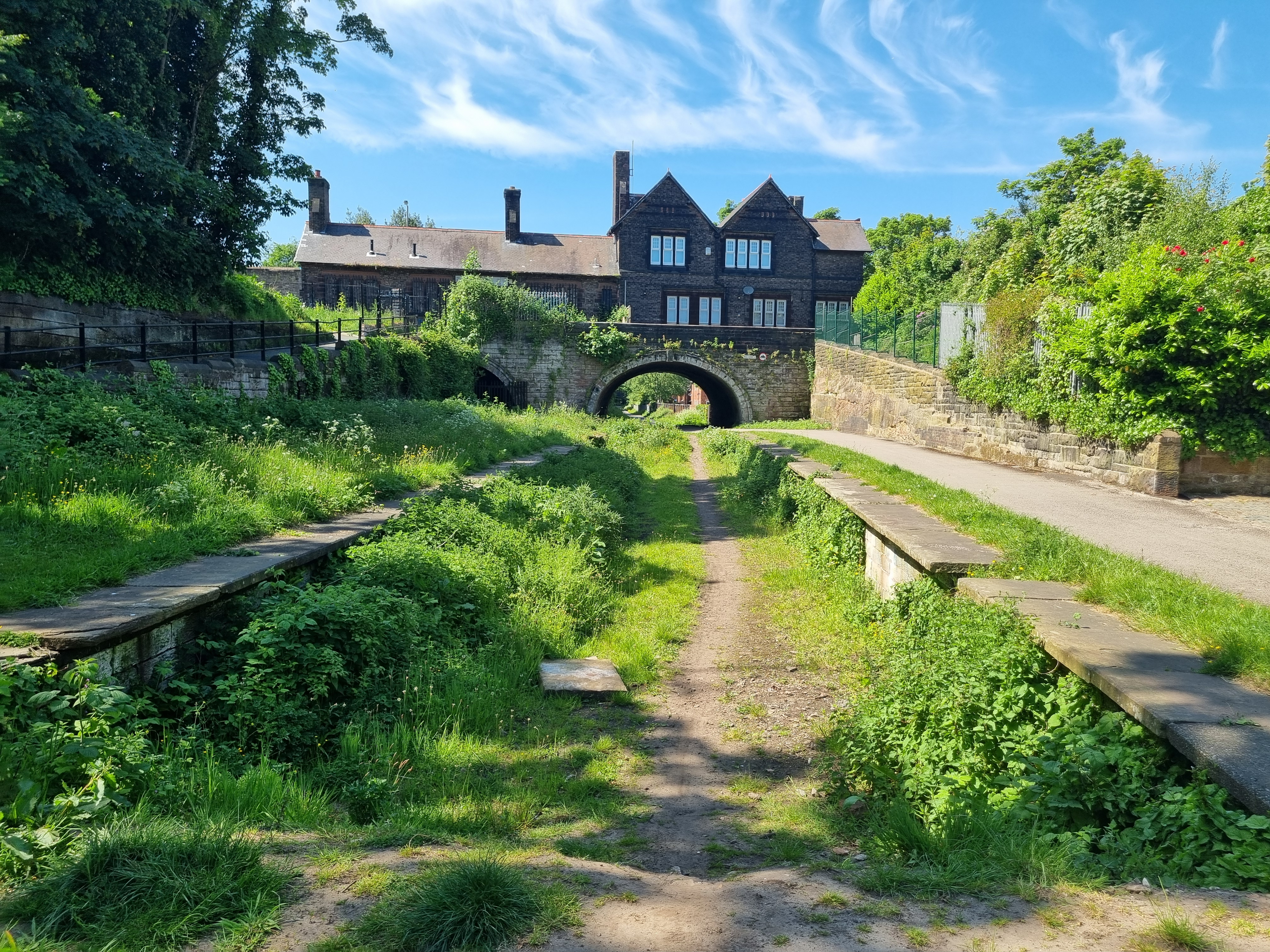
West Derby station on the North Liverpool Extension Line which was to be a part of Merseyrail's Outer Loop.

The Orbital Outer Rail Loop was a part of the initial Merseyrail plans of the 1970s. The route circled the outer fringes of the city of Liverpool using primarily existing rail lines merged to create the loop. With the city of Liverpool having a semi-circular footprint with the city centre at the western fringe against the River Mersey, the western section of the loop would run through the city centre. This was completed being now the a part of the Merseyrail's Northern Line. The scheme was begun along with the creation of Merseyrail, however, owing to cost-cutting the eastern section was postponed.

The concept of using the former Cheshire Lines Committee's North Liverpool Extension Line route through the eastern suburbs of Liverpool as the eastern section of a rapid-transit orbital route circling the outskirts of the city first emerged before the Second World War. The proposal was for a 'belt' line using the now-demolished Liverpool Overhead Railway, which ran along the river front, as its western section.

In the 1960s, during the planning for Merseyrail, this was developed into the Outer Rail Loop scheme: an electric rapid-transit passenger line circling the outer districts of the city by using a combination of newly electrified existing lines and a new link tunnel under the city centre joining together lines to the north and south of the city centre completing the loop. A feature was that passengers on the mainline radial routes into Lime Street station from the east and south could transfer onto the Outer Loop at two parkway interchange stations and complete their journey to Liverpool suburbs avoiding the need to travel into the city centre: Liverpool South Parkway was one of these stations, opening thirty years after the initial proposal. The Outer Loop would have connected the eastern suburbs of the city—Gateacre, Childwall, Broadgreen, Knotty Ash, West Derby, Norris Green and Walton—with the city centre.

The final plan of the Outer Loop consisted of two sub-loops - serving the northern and southern suburbs with both running through the city centre from the east. These sub-loops allowed more direct journeys to the city centre from the eastern suburbs, giving the overall scheme greater viability.

=== Key components ===
The key components of the Loop were as follows:

The West Section - the existing Merseyrail Electrics Northern Line from Sandhills in the north (later Aintree on the Ormskirk branch) to Hunts Cross. This section includes the most expensive part of the Outer Rail Loop - the Link Line tunnel under Liverpool city centre - and the reopened and electrified line from Liverpool Central to Hunts Cross.

The East Section - the former Cheshire Lines Committee North Liverpool Extension Line initially from Hunts Cross to Walton, however, amended to Aintree.

The North Section - originally the CLC line from Walton to Kirkdale via the Breeze Hill tunnel. In later versions of the scheme the North Mersey Branch from Aintree to Bootle was substituted. The latter is still intact although only used by maintenance trains whilst the former is now partially built over.

The Central Section - the central section was a later addition to the plan and effectively divided the loop into two sub-loops and also gave city centre access for the towns east of Merseyside. This included the unrealised Edge Hill Spur scheme from Liverpool Central Low Level to Edge Hill using the Waterloo Tunnel and a section of the City Line from Edge Hill to Broad Green. A major junction was to have been formed at Broad Green with the eastern section of the Outer Loop with a six platform underground station to be named Rocket under the car park of the Rocket pub near the M62/Queens Drive road junction.

The Outer Rail Loop would have been double-track throughout and electrified using the 750 V DC third-rail system used by the Merseyrail Electrics network.

Although no official proposals have been made to revive the scheme in recent years, the route is effectively safeguarded with periodic calls being made by local politicians for the revival of the complete project or just the short stretch of the route from Hunts Cross to Gateacre. The Gateacre service was the last to operate out of the former Liverpool Central High-Level Station prior to its closure in 1972.

== Preservation ==
The Outer Rail Loop project was a victim of the recession of the late 1970s compounded by delays and cost overruns on the Loop and Link projects and local political opposition. The project was abandoned as a working proposal by Merseytravel in the 1980s. Much expense was incurred in constructing a large bridge taking the M62 motorway over the eastern section and header tunnels at Liverpool Central station. The route is still largely intact, complete with bridges, it is used as walking and cycling trail through the suburbs, though the route is still protected for rail use.

The trackbed of the main section of line now forms part of the National Cycle Network Route 62 and the Trans Pennine Trail.
