= Clifford Holroyde Specialist SEN College =

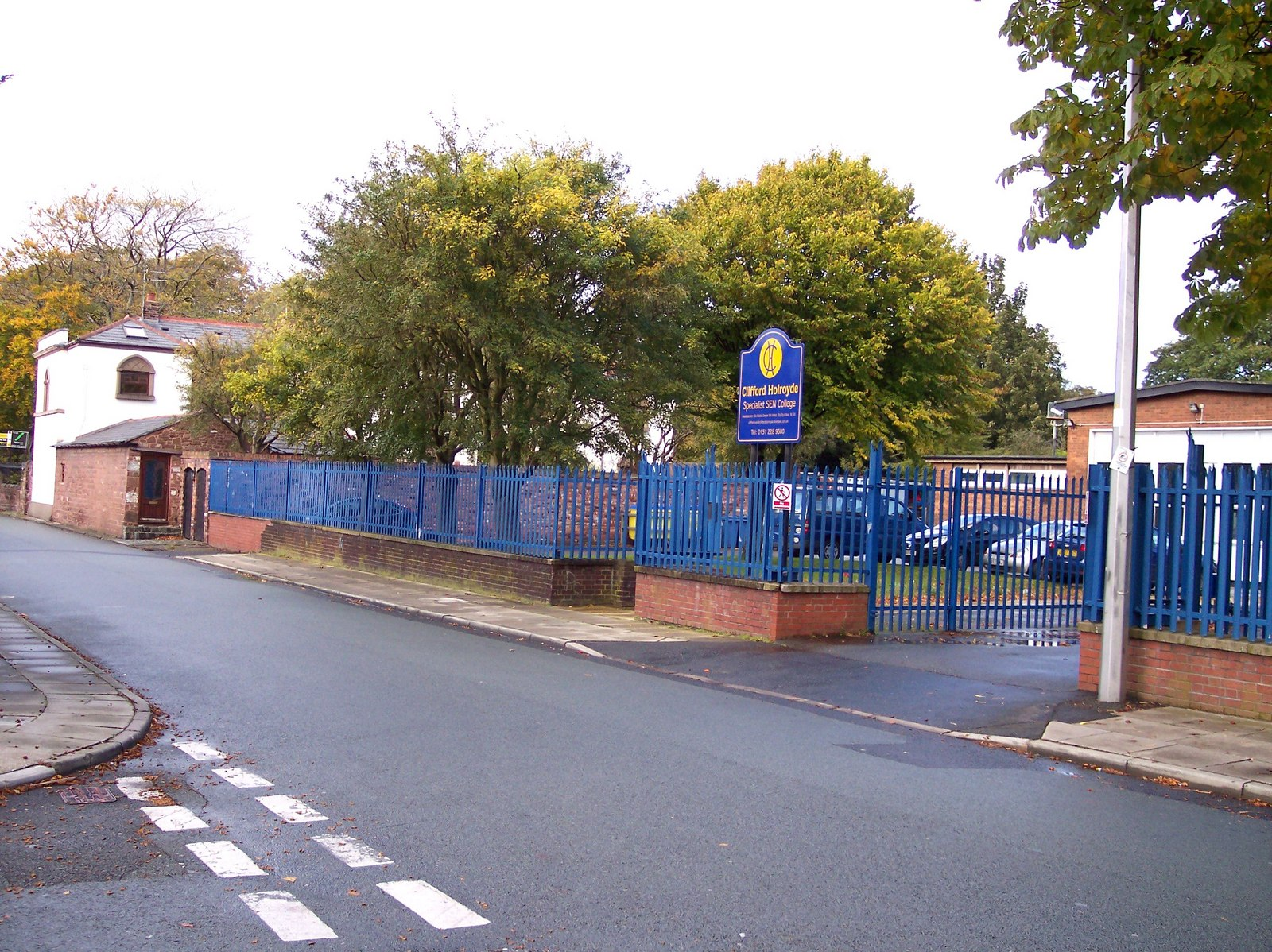

Location
- Thingwall Lane; Liverpool, Merseyside, L14 7NX; England
- Coordinates: 53.413628°N 2.890188°W

Information
- Type: Community special school
- Local authority: Liverpool City Council
- Specialist: SEN
- Department for Education URN: 104742 Tables
- Ofsted: Reports
- Headteacher: Ian Griffiths
- Gender: Boys
- Age: 11 to 16
- Enrolment: 68

Clifford Holroyde Specialist SEN College is a special educational needs college in the district of Knotty Ash in the city of Liverpool, Merseyside. It caters for boys aged 11–16 who have statements of special educational needs relating to behavioural, emotional and social difficulties.

The school was inspected in 2014 and judged Good.
