= Cheshire Lines Committee =

Railway in England: active from 1863 to 1947

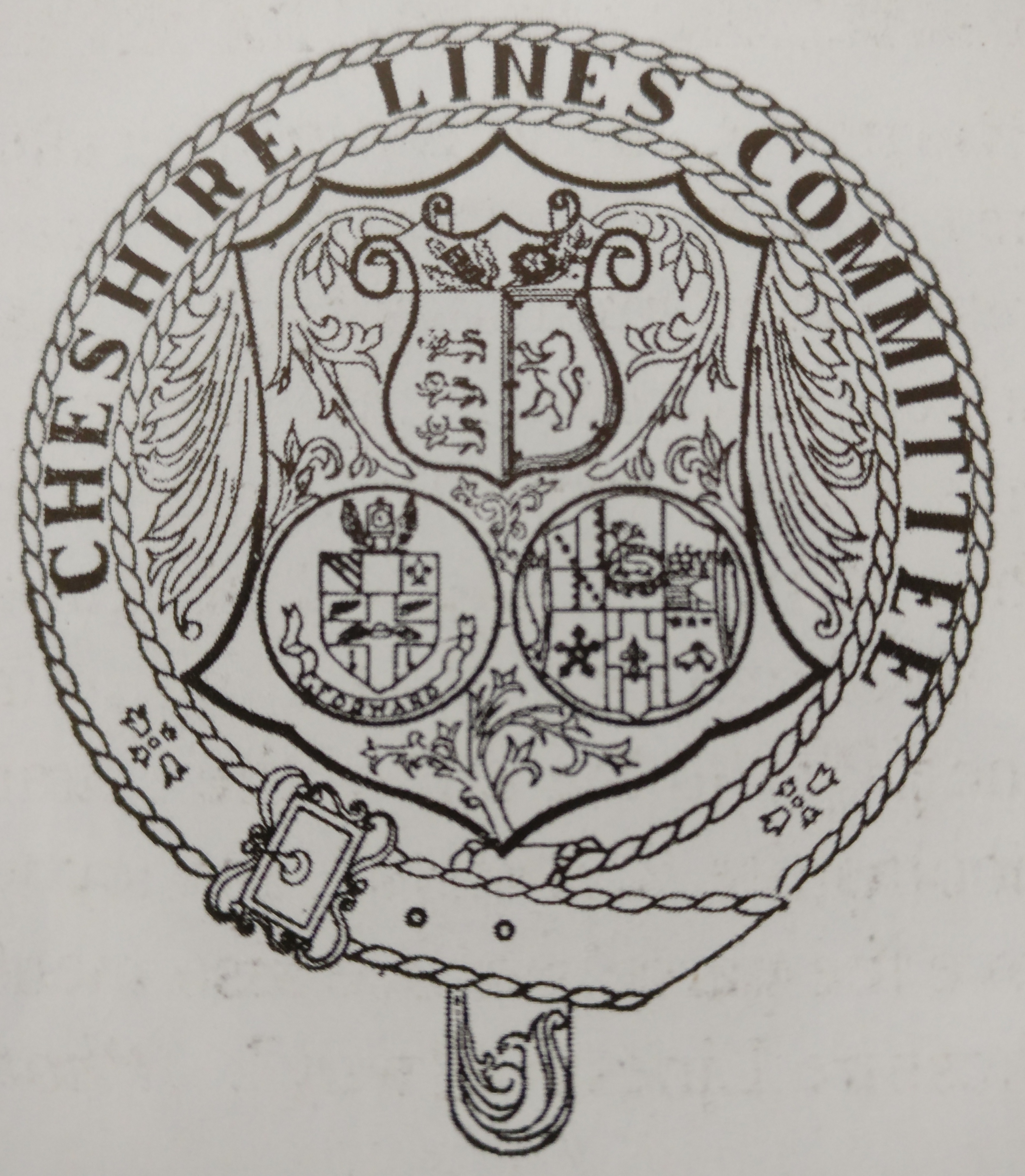

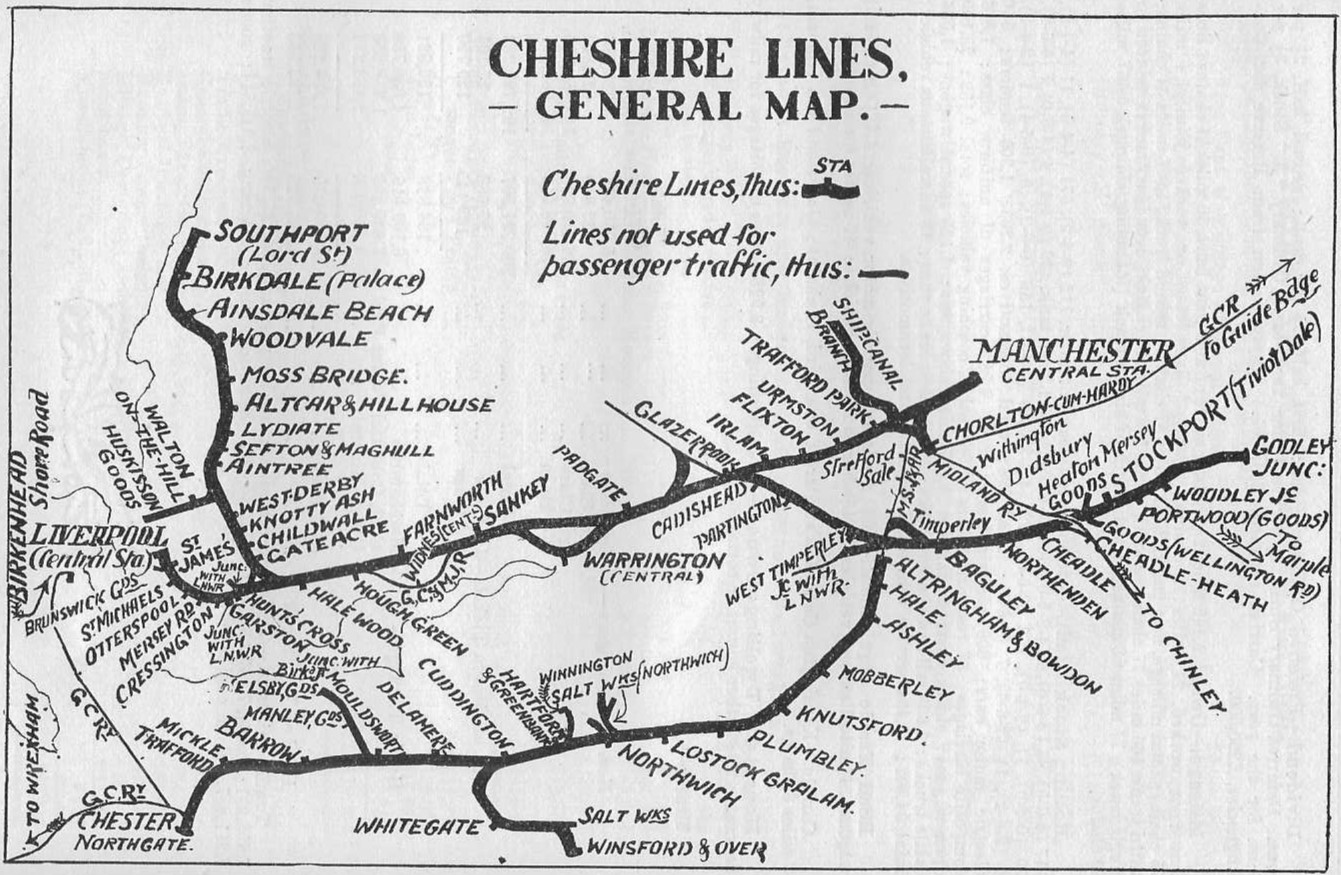
- 1926 map of CLC

Overview
- Locale: Lancashire and Cheshire
- Dates of operation: 1863–1947
- Predecessors: Stockport and Woodley Junction Railway; Cheshire Midland Railway; Stockport, Timperley and Altrincham Junction Railway; West Cheshire Railway; Garston and Liverpool Railway; The Liverpool Central Station Railway
- Successor: British Railways

Technical
- Track gauge: 4 ft 8 1/2 in (1,435 mm) standard gauge
- Length: 143 1/4 miles (230.5 km) (1925)
- Track length: 441 miles 1 chain (709.7 km) (1925)

The Cheshire Lines Committee (CLC) was formed in the 1860s and became the second-largest joint railway in Great Britain. The committee, which was often styled the Cheshire Lines Railway, operated 143 miles (230 km) of track in the then counties of Lancashire and Cheshire. The railway did not become part of the Big Four during the implementation of the 1923 grouping, surviving independently with its own management until the railways were nationalised at the beginning of 1948. The railway served Liverpool, Manchester, Stockport, Warrington, Widnes, Northwich, Winsford, Knutsford, Chester and Southport with connections to many other railways.

== Formation ==
The Cheshire Lines Committee evolved in the late 1850s from the close working together of two railways, the Manchester, Sheffield and Lincolnshire Railway (MS&LR) and the Great Northern Railway (GNR); this was in their desire to break the near monopoly on rail traffic held by the London and North Western Railway (LNWR) in the Southern Lancashire and Northern Cheshire areas. The CLC operated in an area which included the rapidly growing major cities of Manchester and Liverpool, the developing Lancashire coal fields and the growth of the Mersey's seaborne trade.

In 1857, the GNR and MS&LR arranged to work closer together. The MS&LR had just come out of an unhappy alliance with the LNWR and the GNR was motivated by the opportunity to gain access to Manchester, via the MS&LR route from Retford. A joint MS&LR/GNR service between Manchester London Road and London Kings Cross was provided and the arrangements were formalised by Parliament in the Great Northern and Manchester, Sheffield and Lincolnshire Railway Companies Act 1858 (21 & 22 Vict. c. cxiii).

Relations between the LNWR and MS&LR companies were never strong, but they deteriorated in 1859 when the MS&LR supported several new railways in the Manchester area; two of which, the Cheshire Midland (incorporated 14 June 1860) and the Stockport and Woodley Junction (incorporated 15 May 1860) were to form part of the initial CLC.

In 1860, the MS&LR was interested in three additional bills that would extend its influence towards Liverpool and Chester; they were the Garston and Liverpool (incorporated 17 May 1861), the Stockport, Timperley and Altrincham Junction (incorporated 17 May 1861) and the West Cheshire (incorporated 11 July 1861). Unfortunately, the MS&LR was unable to fund the building of these railways by itself. (Note: A draft act of Parliament is known as a bill in the UK.)

The shortage of funds led to a variety of negotiations, including the potential of a merger with the GNR, but eventually an agreement was reached on 11 June 1862 between the MS&LR and the GNR. The arrangement was for the establishment of a joint committee to regulate and work traffic on four of the railways already authorised but not yet open. The lines were:

- Stockport and Woodley Junction Railway opened 12 January 1863.
- Cheshire Midland Railway opened in two stages in May 1862 and January 1863. (Note: The act setting up the Cheshire Midland Railway allowed for the LNWR to subscribe to the line, they chose not to.)
- Stockport, Timperley and Altrincham Junction Railway opened in December 1865.
- West Cheshire Railway opened on 1 September 1869.

Great Northern Railway (Cheshire Lines) Act 1863
- Act of Parliament
- Parliament of the United Kingdom
- Long title: An Act to grant to the Great Northern Railway Company certain Powers with respect to the Stockport and Woodley Junction, Cheshire Midland, Stockport, Timperley, and Altrincham Junction, West Cheshire, and Manchester South Junction and Altrincham Railways; and for other Purposes.
- Citation: 26 & 27 Vict. c. cxlvii

Dates
- Royal assent: 13 July 1863

Text of statute as originally enacted

Each company was to provide an equal amount of capital and four representatives to the joint management committee. This arrangement was confirmed by the Great Northern Railway (Cheshire Lines) Act 1863 (26 & 27 Vict. c. cxlvii); this was the first official use of Cheshire Lines and at the time it was entirely appropriate as the majority of the lines involved were in Cheshire. This act had not, however, formally set up a separate legal body, providing instead for the two companies to manage and work the four railways through their existing structures.

In 1861, the two partners, MS&LR & GNR, had been authorised by the Garston and Liverpool Railway Act 1861 (24 & 25 Vict. c. xxxv) to construct the Garston and Liverpool Railway which made an end-on connection with the St Helens Canal and Railway Company at Garston Dock. This line opened on 1 June 1864 and ran for 3 miles 73 chains (6.3 km) to a terminus at Liverpool Brunswick. This terminus station was only in use from 1864 to 1874, when it was superseded by Liverpool Central, but it did have an extended life as a goods station. The act included a short (26 chains (520 m)) line to connect a goods station, Wavertree Road (later Wavertree and Edge Hill), to the LNWR at Edge Hill and running powers from there to Garston.

Included within this act were running powers between Garston Dock and Timperley Junction using the lines of the LNWR through Widnes, Warrington and Lymm. (Note: The lines were originally the St Helens and Runcorn Gap Railway, which had been leased to the LNWR by this time and the former Warrington and Altrincham Junction Railway, which had become the Warrington and Stockport Railway, had been purchased by the LNWR (in 1861 according to Reed or 1867 according to Awdry).) and then the Manchester, South Junction and Altrincham Railway (MSJ&AR) through to Manchester. The jointly administered lines at this time were known as The Liverpool, Garston & Cheshire Railways.

Liverpool Brunswick station was inconveniently situated near the Southern docks, a good distance from the city centre. This necessitated the railway to transport passengers and their goods by omnibus into the city centre. To rectify this, the partners applied to build an extension railway and this resulted in the building of a difficult line, mainly in tunnels, to a new Central Station, with powers granted by the Liverpool Central Station Railway Act 1864 (27 & 28 Vict. c. ccxc).

The Midland Railway (MR) secured a route into Manchester city centre in 1862 and they began to look at options to secure traffic to the west of Manchester and particularly into Liverpool. This led to their associating with the MS&LR and GNR and their partnership working of the lines mentioned above.

Cheshire Lines Transfer Act 1865
- Act of Parliament
- Parliament of the United Kingdom
- Long title: An Act to vest in the Great Northern, the Manchester, Sheffield, and Lincolnshire, and the Midland Railway Companies, jointly, the Stockport and Woodley Junction, the Stockport, Timperley, and Altrincham Junction, the Cheshire Midland, the West Cheshire, and the Garston and Liverpool Railways; and for other Purposes with respect to the said Undertakings.
- Citation: 28 & 29 Vict. c. cccxxvii

Dates
- Royal assent: 5 July 1865

These lines were brought together under the direct joint ownership of the MS&LR and GNR by the Cheshire Lines Transfer Act 1865 (28 & 29 Vict. c. cccxxvii). They were:

- Stockport and Woodley Junction Railway;
- Cheshire Midland Railway;
- Stockport, Timperley and Altrincham Junction Railway;
- West Cheshire Railway;
- Garston and Liverpool Railway; and
- The Liverpool Central Station Railway.

The act additionally gave powers for the MR to join as an equal partner, which it did in 1866.

Cheshire Lines Act 1866
- Act of Parliament
- Parliament of the United Kingdom
- Long title: An Act for granting to the Great Northern Railway Company Running Powers over a Portion of the Newton and Compstall Branch Railway of the Manchester, Sheffield, and Lincolnshire Railway Company; and for authorizing the said Two Companies and the Midland Railway Company to execute certain Works, and for authorizing the Great Northern Railway Company and the Midland Railway Company to become joint Owners with the Manchester, Sheffield, and Lincolnshire Railway Company of that Company's Godley and Woodley Branch Railway; and for transferring to the said Three Companies certain Powers of the Chester and West Cheshire Junction Railway Company; and for other Purposes.
- Citation: 29 & 30 Vict. c. cccli

Dates
- Royal assent: 10 August 1866

The MS&LR's Godley and Woodley Branch Railway was transferred to the CLC by the Cheshire Lines Act 1866 (29 & 30 Vict. c. cccli). This left a small section (27 chains (540 m)) of track between Apethorne Junction and Woodley Junction that still belonged to the Sheffield and Midland Joint Railway, with the CLC having running powers.

Cheshire Lines Act 1867
- Act of Parliament
- Parliament of the United Kingdom
- Long title: An Act for incorporating the Cheshire Lines Committee, and for authorising that Committee to make a new Road, and for other Purposes.
- Citation: 30 & 31 Vict. c. ccvii

Dates
- Royal assent: 15 August 1867

Text of statute as originally enacted

The Cheshire Lines Committee was finally authorised, by the Cheshire Lines Act 1867 (30 & 31 Vict. c. ccvii), as a fully independent organisation with a board formed from three directors from each of the parent companies.

== Manchester to Liverpool ==
In 1864, Mr Edward Watkin, the MS&LR's chairman, proposed a more direct railway from Manchester to connect with the Garston and Liverpool Railway; this was mainly on the grounds that the existing arrangements for running powers on LNWR lines were inadequate. He had a point, as the lines were being used by three companies and had several curves that needed careful, and therefore slow, negotiation; there were 95 level-crossings and 60 or more signals in each direction.

This proposal was made in the name of the MS&LR only, but Mr Watkin solicited support from the other CLC partners as it was in their interest, because of a competing potential alliance between the Lancashire and Yorkshire Railway (L&YR) and the Great Eastern Railway (GER). This proposal led to the Manchester, Sheffield and Lincolnshire Railway (Extension to Liverpool) Act 1865 (28 & 29 Vict. c. ccclxxviii); this act was subsequently amended by the Manchester, Sheffield and Lincolnshire Railway (New Lines) Act 1866 (29 & 30 Vict. c. cxcii) which altered the route slightly.

The result was two lines:

- one from Cornbrook, near Old Trafford in Manchester, where a connection was made with the MSJ&AR to a junction with CLC (former Garston and Liverpool Railway) line near Cressington;
- the second from a junction with the first line at Glazebrook to a new junction, Skelton junction, with the CLC (former Stockport, Timperley and Altrincham Junction Railway) near Timperley. (Note: These bills were going through Parliament at the same time as the CLC authorisation bill; they, therefore, still use the older company names)

The other alteration to the route, promulgated under the 1866 act, was as the result of Warrington residents agitating to have the railway come closer to the town centre. The 1865 plan had Warrington station positioned to the north on the straight route, halfway between Padgate and Sankey stations in a direct line; this would have been about 1,000 yards (910 m) further from the town. A loop was constructed into the town and Warrington Central and goods yard was constructed on it. The loop and station opened in 1873; the direct route, otherwise known as the Warrington avoiding line, was not opened until 1883. In 1897 an impressive two-storey brick goods warehouse was built in the goods yard, superseding an earlier smaller structure.

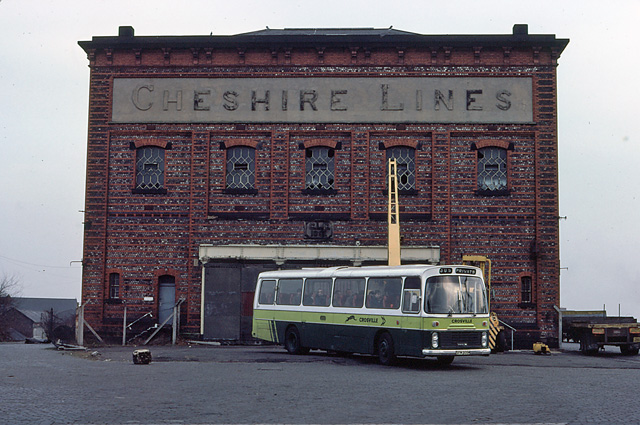
Warrington Central Goods Depot

A further MS&LR act, the Manchester, Sheffield and Lincolnshire Railway (Liverpool Extension) Act 1866 (29 & 30 Vict. c. cxci), then formally transferred these lines into the CLC.

The direct line to Liverpool Brunswick was opened in 1873 and, from then, the CLC used this more direct route between Manchester London Road and Liverpool Brunswick. The route was further improved when Liverpool Central station opened on 1 March 1874, bringing trains into the city centre. The station was situated on Ranelagh Street on the edge of the city centre and was a much grander station of three stories with a large arched roof and six platform faces. At the same time as Central opened, Brunswick closed to passenger traffic; it became a goods station and a much larger warehouse was built around the original station building. The building was so large, about 300 by 500 feet (91 m × 152 m), it was long enough to write the owners names in full Great Northern, Manchester Sheffield & Lincolnshire and Midland Railways.

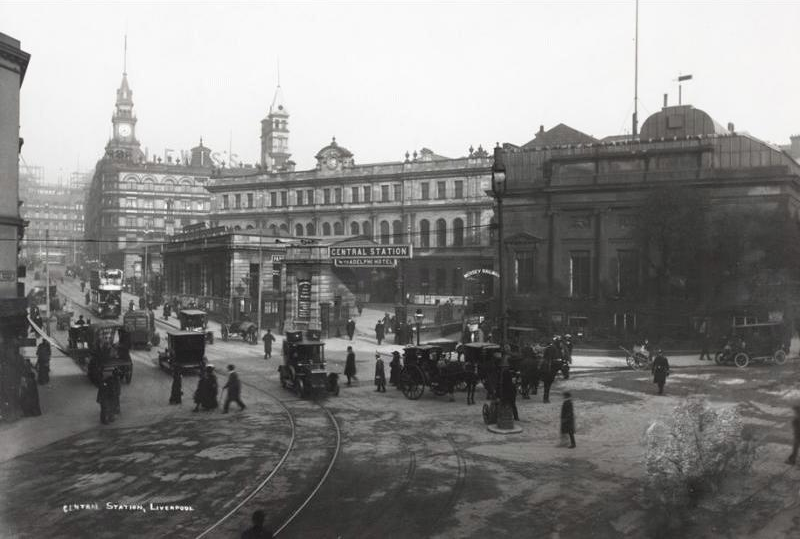
Liverpool Central Station

In 1879, a connection was made from the direct line to the expanding town of Widnes; the Widnes loop line ran from a junction between Sankey and Farnworth to the south, through Widnes Central and back to join the direct line at Hough Green. The line was jointly owned by the MS&LR and the MR; the CLC ran a passenger service on the line. The loop line closed in 1964.

The building of the Manchester Ship Canal resulted in two diversions of the line in order to cross the canal at a high level on fixed bridges. The first was at Irlam where a diversion was constructed to the south of the original line and a new station was constructed, both the old route and the diversion were operational from 9 January 1893 to 27 March 1893 when the original route closed. The second diversion was between Glazebrook and West Timperley where both intermediate stations, Cadishead and Partington, were rebuilt on raised lines either side of the ship canal. Both routes were operational from 27 February 1893 to 29 May 1893 when the original route closed.

== Extension to Chester ==
The Chester and West Cheshire Junction Railway Company had been incorporated in 1865 to construct railways from Mouldsworth to Mickle Trafford and onto Chester Northgate, with a junction at Mickle Trafford connecting to the Birkenhead Railway.

This was a natural extension of the CLC network and indeed authorised, albeit by a different company, what the West Cheshire Railway had applied, and failed, to do in 1861. It brought access to the county town of Chester, an important tourist centre and gateway to North Wales to the expanding network. The Chester and West Cheshire Junction Railway Company was transferred into the CLC on 10 August 1866 by the Cheshire Lines Act 1868 (29 & 30 Vict. c. cccli).

Construction work did not start straight away, being delayed by contractual negotiations until 1871. The route was 7 miles 43 chains (12.1 km) of double track with 23 bridges. There were intermediate stations at Tarvin & Barrow and Mickle Trafford. The railways, but not the junction with the Birkenhead Railway, opened for goods traffic on 2 November 1874 and for passengers on 1 May 1875. The junction at Mickle Trafford was made in 1875 to enable traffic between the CLC and Chester General but it was not used due to a dispute. The CLC ran five trains in each direction daily between Manchester Oxford Road which was a MSJ&AR station and Chester Northgate.

== Improvements in Manchester ==
The direct route to Liverpool, and into Liverpool Central station from 1874, allowed an increased density of service with sixteen trains in each direction. These trains left Manchester London Road using the Manchester, South Junction and Altrincham Railway (MSJ&AR) as far as Cornbrook, then crossing onto the CLC direct line. It was recognised early on that the additional services were going to cause congestion at the Manchester end of the line; at this time, London Road station had been expanded and effectively divided into several stations. The main station was split in half: one half for the LNWR and the other for the MS&LR, which it shared with the Midland Railway. The third section of the station was the MSJ&AR platform area, adjacent to the main station; these platforms were used as the terminus for passenger services, but the lines also provided a through connection for freight from Lancashire to Yorkshire.

Cheshire Lines Act 1872
- Act of Parliament
- Parliament of the United Kingdom
- Long title: An Act for conferring further powers on the Cheshire Lines Committee, and upon the three Companies represented upon that Committee; for amending the Acts relating to and making further provision respecting the railways and works belonging to or under the management of the Committee; and for other purposes.
- Citation: 35 & 36 Vict. c. lvii

Dates
- Royal assent: 27 June 1872

Text of statute as originally enacted

Initially, the CLC obtained powers, in the Cheshire Lines Act 1872 (35 & 36 Vict. c. lvii), to build a new line 1 mile 20 chains (2.0 km) long from Cornbrook into Manchester, with all proper stations, approaches, works and conveniences connected therewith, terminating on the southern side of Windmill Street.

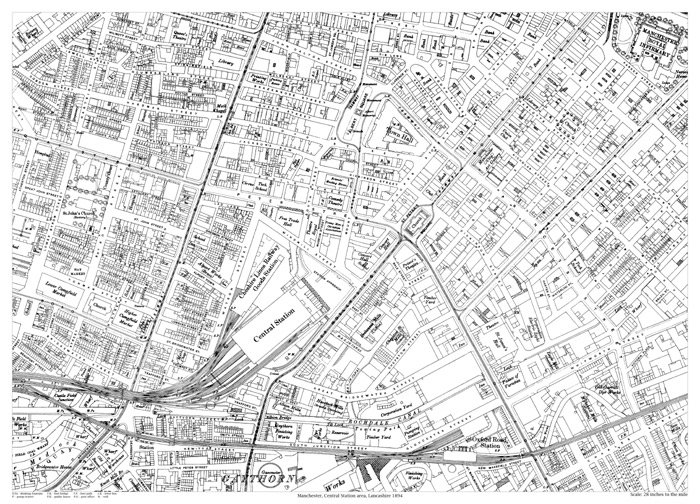
Manchester Central showing the goods station which was the former Free Trade Hall Station

This brought the CLC right into Manchester city centre and a temporary station, Manchester Free Trade Hall station, was opened on 9 July 1877. This station was a modest affair, with two platforms and two intermediate tracks, but it enabled the CLC to introduce an improved hourly express service to Liverpool taking 45 minutes which attracted passengers.

Cheshire Lines Act 1875
- Act of Parliament
- Parliament of the United Kingdom
- Long title: An Act for conferring further powers on the Cheshire Lines Committee; and for other purposes.
- Citation: 38 & 39 Vict. c. xci

Dates
- Royal assent: 29 June 1875

Text of statute as originally enacted

Even before the temporary Free Trade Hall station opened, the CLC had been authorised by the Cheshire Lines Act 1875 (38 & 39 Vict. c. xci) to build a permanent station; this station, Manchester Central which was opened on 1 July 1880, was immediately adjacent to Free Trade Hall station with its frontage on Windmill Street. This station had two storeys, goods below and passengers above; it had eight platforms, later increased to nine, six of which were covered by an impressive 210 feet (64 m) single span roof, the other two were protected by an awning on the side of the shed. Most of the station facilities, including the booking office and waiting rooms, were of wooden construction, being intended for temporary use but they lasted until the station's eventual closure in 1969.

When Central opened in 1880, the Free Trade Hall station closed to passengers and was converted to a goods station; it had another warehouse added in 1882.

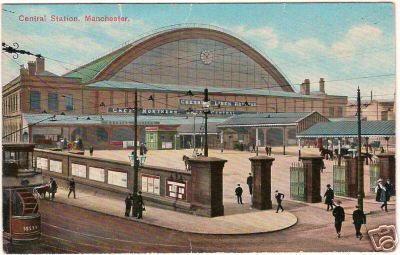
Manchester Central Station

The Great Northern Railway (GNR) opened a goods warehouse adjacent to the former Free Trade Hall station, between it and Deansgate; the warehouse and its connecting line opened in 1898. The GNR worked goods trains into it from Colwick, using running powers over the Midland from Codnor Park Junction.

== Midlands connection ==
The Manchester South District Railway (MSDR) was originally promoted by a group of local landowners, supported by the Midland Railway (MR), to provide a local railway between Manchester and Alderley. It was incorporated by the Manchester South District Railway Act 1873 (36 & 37 Vict. c. ccxxii), but nothing done by 1875 when the MR proposed that the section north of Stockport should become part of the CLC, thereby providing MR with access to Central.

At about the same time, in 1875, the construction of Manchester Free Trade Hall station was taking place; the authorisation for the permanent Manchester Central station had been obtained and the MS&LR gave notice to the Midland to quit using Manchester London Road station within three years because of the congestion, as the Midland was a partner in the CLC it was natural for them to try to gain access to the new Central.

In 1876, with nothing much happening on the MSDR and the Midland Railway becoming increasing anxious to find station facilities in Manchester, the Midland proposed that the MSDR became a joint railway to be known as the Sheffield and Midland Railway Companies Committee (MS&LR & MR). A condition of the joint railway was equal funding of the capital to build the line; the MS&LR was not forthcoming with their share and the Midland then petitioned for the undertaking to be transferred to its sole ownership, which was accepted. The Act also provided powers for the GNR to share in the enterprise, in which case the line would have transferred to the CLC; this option was not exercised, so it remained a Midland Railway line. The line from Heaton Mersey Junction to Throstle Nest Junction (later Throstle Nest East Junction), on the CLC near Cornbrook, opened on 1 January 1880. The Midland set up local services from Free Trade Hall to Stockport Tiviot Dale of 14 passenger trains each way, plus a daily goods train from Wellington Road goods; there were intermediate stations at Chorlton-cum-Hardy, Withington, Didsbury and Heaton Mersey. On 1 August 1880, MR switched its services from London Road to Manchester Central. When the MR was established at Central, they had 26 departures: the 14 South District local trains; and 12 trains for Derby, Nottingham, Leicester and London.

In 1891, the section from Throstle Nest Junction to Chorlton Junction (the junction with the MS&LR line to Fairfield on the London Road to Guide Bridge route) was transferred to the CLC.

== Expansion on Merseyside ==
Completion of the direct Manchester to Liverpool line, and the connections to it from Timperley and on to the Midland Railway, provided the partners with access to Liverpool without going through Manchester. The only connection the CLC had with the dock complex on the Mersey was at Brunswick, at the very southern end of the docks. Despite improvements made during the 1870s and 1880s and connections with adjacent docks from 1884, the CLC was not able to compete with other railways in the area for the large freight market. Both the LNWR and the L&YR had better connections to the docks, both in terms of quantity and the quality of which docks they connected to.

Cheshire Lines Act 1874
- Act of Parliament
- Parliament of the United Kingdom
- Long title: An Act for enabling the Cheshire lines Committee to construct certain Branch Lines; for conferring further powers on the Committee and upon the three Companies represented on that Committee; and for other purposes.
- Citation: 37 & 38 Vict. c. clxix

Dates
- Royal assent: 30 July 1874

Text of statute as originally enacted

To improve this situation, the CLC acquired 23 acres (9.3 ha) of land at Huskisson in north Liverpool. To access this site, several lines were authorised by the Cheshire Lines Act 1874 (37 & 38 Vict. c. clxix). These lines, known locally as the North Liverpool Extension Line, were:

- Halewood to Aintree: facilitated by a north bound triangular junction from the Liverpool Extension Railway between Halewood and Hunts Cross stations to a junction with the East Lancashire section of the L&YR at Aintree. The inside of these junctions provided space for an extensive array of goods sidings.
- Fazakerley to Walton-on-the-Hill and Huskisson: facilitated by a westbound triangular junction from the Halewood to Aintree line above. The inside of these junctions also provided space for another extensive array of goods sidings.

The lines were opened to Aintree Junction and Walton-on-the-Hill on 1 December 1879, with stations at Gateacre for Woolton, Childwall, Old Swan and Knotty Ash, West Derby and Walton-on-the-Hill. The section to Huskisson and Huskisson station, for both passenger and goods trains, opened on 1 June 1880. A passenger service was provided from Liverpool Central to Walton-on-the-Hill, but it proved unpopular and thereafter most services terminated at Gateacre. When Huskisson opened, it too was provided with a passenger service that was even less popular: it was withdrawn on 1 May 1885 and the station closed. The line became known as the Liverpool Loop Line.

Huskisson goods facility became a large complex of warehouses and sidings, including cranes, stablings, cattle pens for up to 2,000 cattle, cotton and grain stores, offices and a turntable. There was a timber yard in Victoria Road and a lairage for a further 1,200 cattle in Foster Street, to cope with the cattle traffic from Ireland; much of which was on its way to Stanley cattle market near Knotty Ash station. A short (30 chains (600 m)) connection was made from Huskisson to Victoria Yard Goods (owned by the Mersey Docks and Harbour Board) and Sandon and Canada Goods railway station (owned by the Midland Railway) in 1882.

The junction with the L&YR was to the north of a further station, Aintree Racecourse which opened on 13 July 1880 (becoming Aintree on 1884). This connection at Aintree provided an additional route onto the CLC for Midland Railway traffic, which had access from the north via Colne and Preston.

The Midland Railway made a connection at Fazakerley to its Langton Dock Branch and goods station in 1885.

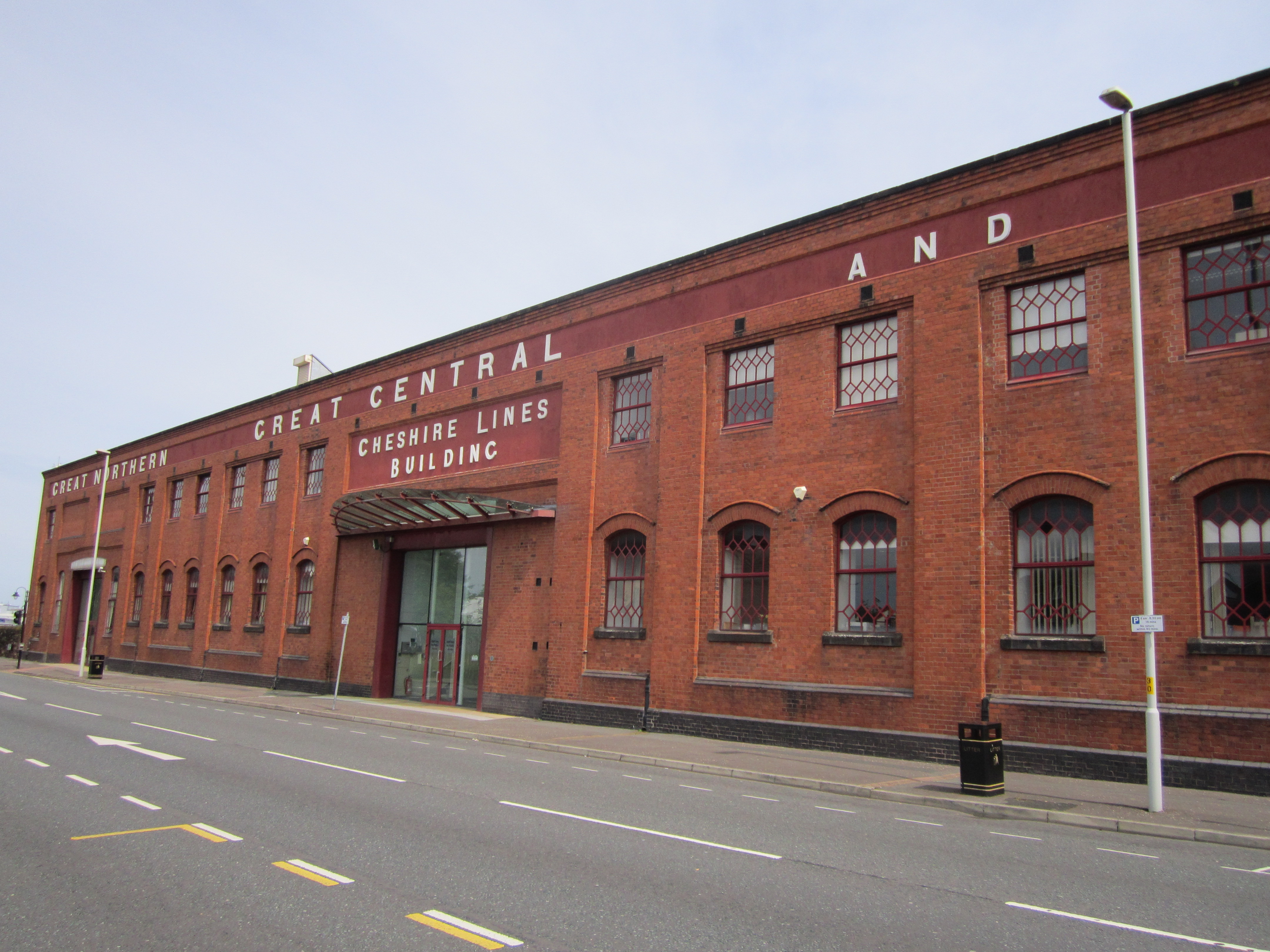
Cheshire Lines Building, Birkenhead

The CLC established goods depots over the Mersey in Birkenhead; they opened Shore Road Goods depot on 1 July 1871 to the south of the docks and the East & West Float depot at Duke Street in November 1892 to the north. Neither depot was connected to CLC lines, but were accessed from Helsby over the Birkenhead Railway.

The Mersey Railway completes a link from its former terminus at Liverpool James Street to a new station at Liverpool Central (low-level) on 11 January 1892. The railway did not connect to the CLC lines, but ran to an underground station accessed via steps from the upper station concourse.

== Southport and Cheshire Lines Extension Railway ==
An extension was connected to the North Liverpool Extension Line at Aintree in 1884; this line ran 14 miles 3 chains (22.6 km) to Southport Lord Street. The line was independent but was operated by the CLC.

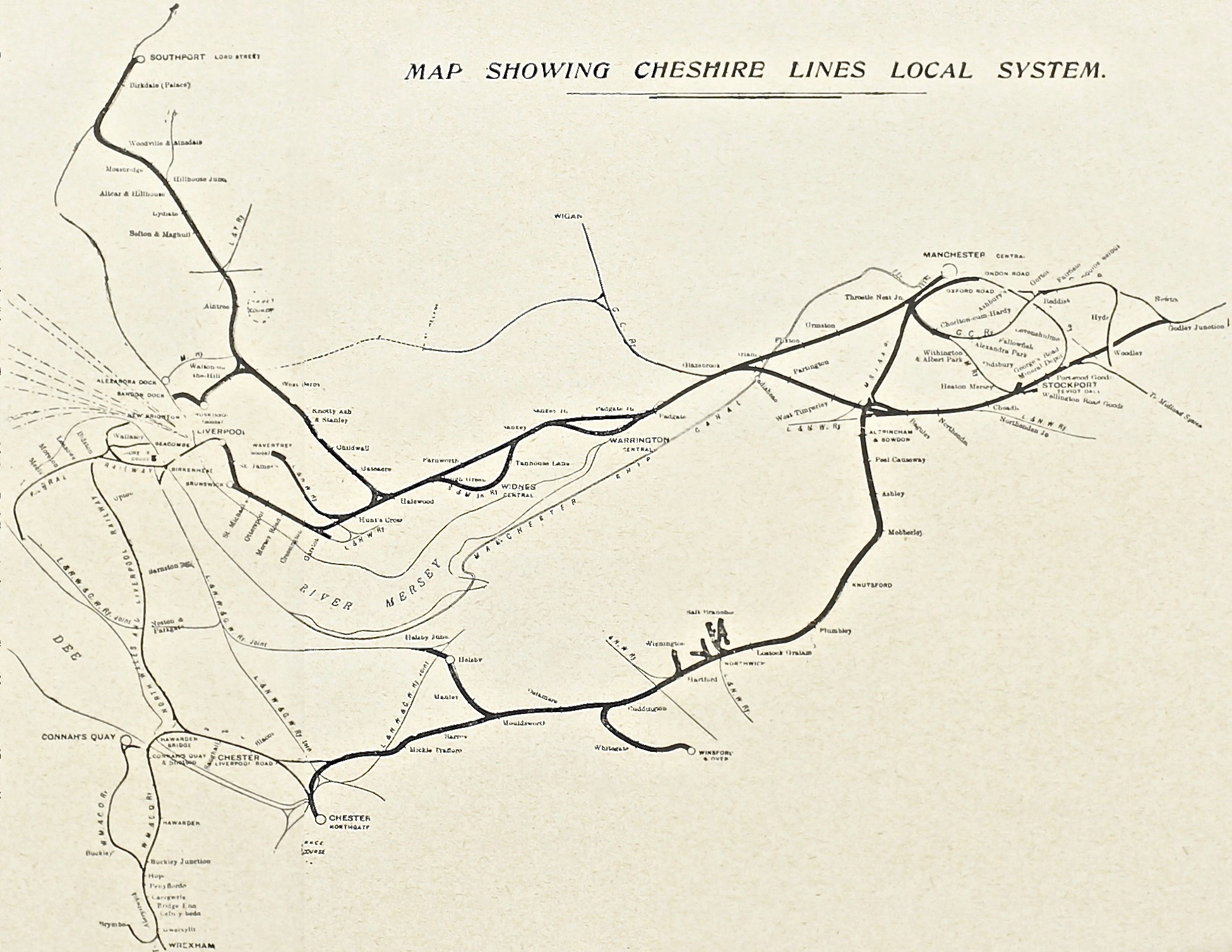
Map of the Cheshire Lines and neighbouring railways in 1899

== Management ==
Cheshire Lines Act 1873
- Act of Parliament
- Parliament of the United Kingdom
- Long title: An Act for conferring further powers on the Cheshire Lines Committee; and for other purposes.
- Citation: 36 & 37 Vict. c. cliii

Dates
- Royal assent: 21 July 1873

Text of statute as originally enacted

Cheshire Lines Act 1877
- Act of Parliament
- Parliament of the United Kingdom
- Long title: An Act for conferring further powers upon the Cheshire Lines Committee, and upon the three Companies represented upon that Committee; and for other purposes.
- Citation: 40 & 41 Vict. c. lvi

Dates
- Royal assent: 28 June 1877

Text of statute as originally enacted

Cheshire Lines Act 1881
- Act of Parliament
- Parliament of the United Kingdom
- Long title: An Act for conferring further powers upon the Cheshire Lines Committee, and upon the three Companies represented upon that committee.
- Citation: 44 & 45 Vict. c. cxxxi

Dates
- Royal assent: 18 July 1881

Text of statute as originally enacted

Cheshire Lines Act 1883
- Act of Parliament
- Parliament of the United Kingdom
- Long title: An Act for conferring further powers upon the Cheshire Lines Committee and for other purposes.
- Citation: 46 & 47 Vict. c. xxxi

Dates
- Royal assent: 18 June 1883

Cheshire Lines Act 1889
- Act of Parliament
- Parliament of the United Kingdom
- Long title: An Act for conferring further Powers upon the Cheshire Lines Committee and upon the three Companies represented upon that Committee.
- Citation: 52 & 53 Vict. c. lxxxiv

Dates
- Royal assent: 26 July 1889

Text of statute as originally enacted

Cheshire Lines Act 1890
- Act of Parliament
- Parliament of the United Kingdom
- Long title: An Act for conferring further powers upon the Cheshire Lines Committee and for other purposes.
- Citation: 53 & 54 Vict. c. cxvi

Dates
- Royal assent: 25 July 1890

Text of statute as originally enacted

Cheshire Lines Act 1900
- Act of Parliament
- Parliament of the United Kingdom
- Long title: An Act to enable the Cheshire Lines Committee to make a new railway to acquire additional lands to stop up certain streets and for other purposes.
- Citation: 63 & 64 Vict. c. vi

Dates
- Royal assent: 25 May 1900

Cheshire Lines Act 1903
- Act of Parliament
- Parliament of the United Kingdom
- Long title: An Act to enable the Cheshire Lines Committee to make new railways to acquire additional lands and for other purposes.
- Citation: 3 Edw. 7. c. cxi

Dates
- Royal assent: 21 July 1903

Cheshire Lines Act 1908
- Act of Parliament
- Parliament of the United Kingdom
- Long title: An Act to enable the Cheshire Lines Committee to acquire additional lands to extend the time for the sale of superfluous lands and for other purposes.
- Citation: 8 Edw. 7. c. xxiii

Dates
- Royal assent: 18 June 1908

Text of statute as originally enacted

Cheshire Lines Act 1917
- Act of Parliament
- Parliament of the United Kingdom
- Long title: An Act to amend the provisions of the Manchester Corporation Act 1911 for the protection of the Cheshire Lines Committee and for other purposes.
- Citation: 7 & 8 Geo. 5. c. lv

Dates
- Royal assent: 21 August 1917

Other legislation
- Amends: Manchester Corporation Act 1911

Text of statute as originally enacted

CLC chief offices were originally at 45 Oldhall Street, Liverpool but were transferred in June 1865 to Alexandra Buildings, 19 James Street, Liverpool. They moved to Liverpool Central station when it opened in 1874.

In 1863, the CLC management committee was made up of four representatives each from its founding companies, which were the Manchester, Sheffield and Lincolnshire Railway (MS&LR) and the Great Northern Railway (GNR). The management committee (still at this time just MS&LR and GNR) became direct owners and operators of railways, by the Cheshire Lines Transfer Act 1865 (28 & 29 Vict. c. cccxxvii). The Cheshire Lines Transfer Act 1865 allowed for the Midland Railway to become equal partners in the committee and they took up these powers in 1866; the Cheshire Lines Committee was now finally authorised as a fully independent organisation by the Cheshire Lines Act 1867 (30 & 31 Vict. c. ccvii). Now that the CLC had three parent companies, the management was divided by three with each partner having three places.

The committee first met at Manchester on 5 November 1863, where William English was appointed manager; his tenure lasted until 1882. He was succeeded on 1 October 1882 by David Meldrum, who unfortunately died in office in January 1904. In the interim, the committee was managed by Harry Blundell, the Engineer-in-Chief, and Robert Charlton, the Outdoor Superintendent. James Pinion took over in May 1904 and remained manager until 1910, although with reduced responsibilities in his last year before retirement. There followed another interim period, with Charlton and Blundell and the Indoor Assistant, William Oates, running the committee until a new manager, John Edward Charnley, was appointed in August 1911. He had the difficult job of managing the committee through World War I and the 1923 grouping where most railways were grouped into one of the Big Four.

Charnley was the manager from 1911 to 1922 when he became secretary and manager for three years until he was succeeded, on his death, by his assistant, William Howard Oates in February 1925. Oates also died in office after only a year and was followed by Alfred Percy Ross, who combined the manager's role with that of Chief Engineer for a few years until July 1929. Sidney Burgoyne followed as manager in that December; he had come from the LNER and he returned there in 1932. The committee's last manager also came from the LNER; Gerald Leedham was designated Acting Manager from January 1933 until 1936, when he became Secretary and Manager until the committee was nationalised at the end of 1947. (Note: Griffiths & Goode (1978) has his surname as Leedam, he is reported in Dyckhoff (1999) and at The National Archive website as Leedham.)

== Grouping ==
The Railways Act 1921 (11 & 12 Geo. 5. c. 55) grouped most of Britain's railways into one of the Big Four; however, a number of joint lines remained outside the Big Four and continued to be operated jointly by the successor companies. These included the Cheshire Lines Committee and it remained independent with its own management. Its management was still made up of nine directors, three from each parent company, and these companies had been grouped. The Midland was grouped into the London, Midland and Scottish Railway (LMS), while the GNR and MS&LR (by then the Great Central Railway) became part of the London and North Eastern Railway (LNER). This meant the CLC now had six directors from the LNER and three from the LMS.

The CLC continued under this management arrangement through the Second World War until the railways were nationalised under the Transport Act 1947 (10 & 11 Geo. 6. c. 49) at the beginning of 1948.

== Stock ==
Although, in all other respects, the CLC was a complete railway, it did not own any locomotives. Its motive power was provided by the parent companies which, in practice, was the MS&LR, as it had a comparatively close locomotive works at Gorton in east Manchester. The MS&LR charged the CLC a mileage charge for each locomotive hire, depending on whether it was being used for passenger trains or freight. The directors of the other companies argued from the beginning that the CLC should have its own locomotives, as the hire charge was too high; this led to a reduction in the charge but not by enough to satisfy the GNR and MR directors. Eventually, the issue went to arbitration. Arbitration concluded that there was no viable alternative and the MS&LR (later the GCR/LNER) would provide locomotives for CLC needs, albeit at a slightly reduced rate. The other companies would provide their own locomotives for their own through trains.

On the other hand, facilities for locomotives, the engine sheds, were provided by the CLC. Some of these provided facilities for all of the partners, others just for the MS&LR. They were:

Engine sheds

Shed name	Opened	Closed	Stabling for:	Notes	References
Allerton	1882	c1897	MS&LR		Griffiths & Goode(1978), Dyckhoff(1999), Bolger (1984),
Birkenhead	1888	1961	MS&LR	sub-shed of Brunswick	Dyckhoff(1999), Bolger (1984),
Brunswick	1864	1961	MS&LR, MR		Dyckhoff(1999), Bolger (1984), Pixton(2007),
Chester	1874	1960	MS&LR	Originally a sub-shed of Northwich	Dyckhoff(1999), Bolger (1984),
Cornbrook	1880	1895	MS&LR		Dyckhoff(1999), Bolger (1984),
Heaton Mersey	1889	1968	MS&LR, MR		Dyckhoff(1999), Bolger (1984), Pixton (2011),
Helsby & Alvanley	1893	1929	MS&LR	Sub-shed of Northwich	Dyckhoff(1999), Bolger (1984),
Knutsford	c1863	c1869	MS&LR		Dyckhoff(1999), Bolger (1984),
Northwich	1869	1968	MS&LR, MR		Dyckhoff(1999), Bolger (1984),
Padgate	c1883	c1929	MS&LR		Dyckhoff(1999), Bolger (1984),
Southport	1884	1952	MS&LR	Sub-shed of Walton-on-the-Hil	Dyckhoff(1999), Bolger (1984),
Stockport Tiviot Dale	1866	1889	MS&LR		Dyckhoff(1999), Bolger (1984),
Trafford Park	1894	1968	MS&LR, MR, GNR	Largest shed on the system	Dyckhoff(1999), Bolger (1984),
Walton-on-the-Hill	1881	1963	MS&LR, MR,		Dyckhoff(1999), Bolger (1984), Pixton(2007),
Warrington Central	by 1893	c1966	MS&LR	Sub-shed of Brunswick	Dyckhoff(1999), Bolger (1984),
Winsford	1870	1929	MS&LR	Sub-shed of Northwich	Dyckhoff(1999), Bolger (1984),

The CLC's only contribution to motive power was the introduction of four Sentinel-Cammell steam railcars that were introduced in 1929; they worked all over the network until were withdrawn in 1941 and scrapped in 1944.

At the company's formation, a small number of coaches were provided by the MS&LR and MR jointly. However, an early management meeting recommended that the company have its own carriage stock and, from 1865, four-wheeled carriages were obtained from the Metropolitan Railway Carriage and Wagon Company Ltd and the Railway Carriage Co. of Oldbury. As new lines opened, more carriages were acquired from the same places, the MS&LR and the Ashbury Railway Carriage & Iron Co.

Six-wheeled carriages were introduced when Manchester Central station opened in 1880 and the company then started to use bogie coaches; some of these lasting into the 1930s. Twelve-wheel bogie coaches were introduced from 1881 and were still being made in 1900; all of these coaches had varying mixtures of first, second and third class up until 1892, when second-class was abolished. Coaches were fitted with vacuum braking from about 1887 and some attempts were made with electric lighting about the same time; electric lighting did not become generally adopted until after 1900, the 1890s had to manage with oil gas.

At first, all CLC coaching stock was of MS&LR design, but from 1900 all three owning railways supplied coaches of their respective designs. In 1904, the Gloucester Railway Carriage and Wagon Company supplied some eight-wheel bogie coaches to the CLC designed by John G. Robinson of the GCR. These were of three types – thirds, third brakes, and lavatory composites. The livery was green, lined in yellow, with the lettering "CLC" at waist level. The last GCR-designed coaches built for the CLC, also designed by Robinson but this time built by the CGR at Dukinfield, were for the Liverpool-Manchester expresses, and consisted of nine five-coach trains.

The CLC had a total of 407 coaches in 1902 and 580 in 1923. New articulated stock was introduced in 1937, designed by Nigel Gresley and with a teak finish, for the Liverpool to Manchester service; they were in two trains each of four twins. The number of coaches seems to have been rationalised by 1938, with only a total of 284 coaches.

Similarly, the CLC had its own fleet of wagons, which were painted a pale lead grey for the bodywork, with black running gear and white lettering. There were 4,419 freight vehicles and 91 service vehicles at the end of 1922. In 1929, it was decided that all CLC wagons, other than brake vans and service stock, should be shared between the LMS, which would receive one-third of the wagon fleet, and the LNER, which would receive two-thirds. The transfers took place at the start of 1930, and the LNER was apportioned a total of 2740 wagons, of which: 1936 were open wagons; 551 were covered goods vans; 108 were bolster wagons; 104 cattle trucks; 27 refrigerator or meat vans; and 14 specially-constructed vehicles. The LNER supplied the CLC with some new brake vans, and these were painted in CLC livery, and lettered "CL".

The CLC also owned some road vehicles – at the end of 1922, there were 90 lorries and 9 buses.

== Legacy ==
The CLC routes between Liverpool and Manchester and between Manchester and Chester via Northwich survive. Several CLC stations remain in their original form and are listed buildings, such as Widnes, Sankey and Hunts Cross. The CLC warehouse at Warrington is also a listed building, and has been converted to apartments.

Liverpool Central high-level has been demolished with local services on the former CLC line, operated by Merseyrail, running through an underground station on the same site. Main line services run to and from Liverpool Lime Street. Manchester Central closed on 4 May 1969 and is now the Manchester Central Convention Complex.
