= Aigburth railway station =

Railway station in Liverpool, England

Aigburth
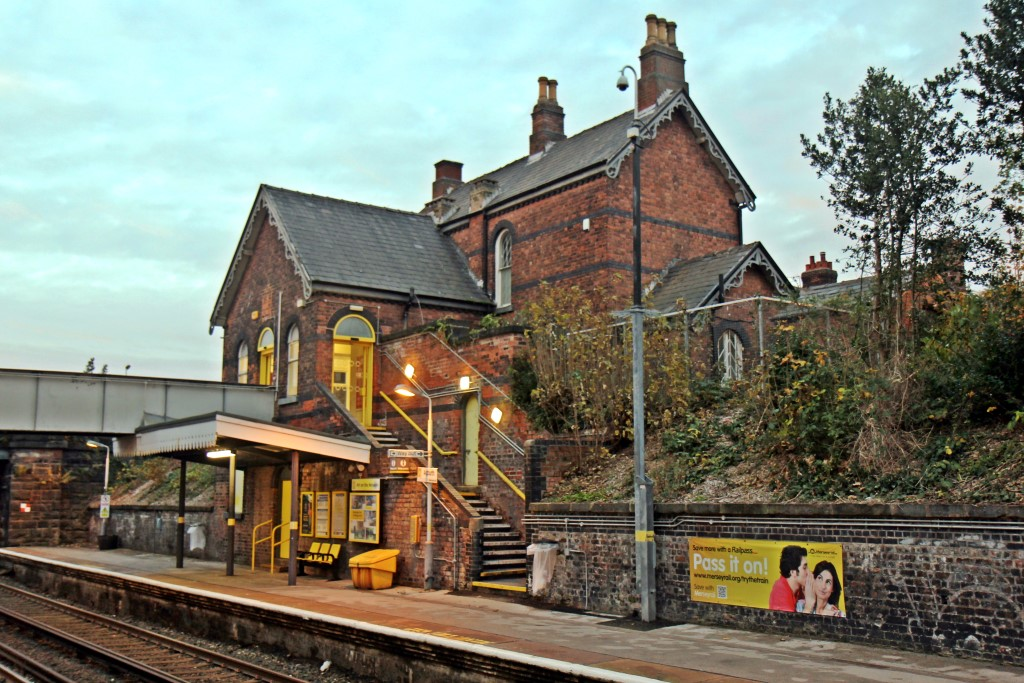
- Aigburth railway station building, viewed from the platform.

General information
- Location: Aigburth, Liverpool; England
- Coordinates: 53.3647°N 2.9268°W
- Grid reference: SJ384857
- Manager: Merseyrail
- Transit authority: Merseytravel
- Platforms: 2

Other information
- Station code: AIG
- Fare zone: C1
- Classification: DfT category E

Key dates
- 1 June 1864: Opened as Mersey Road
- 1880: Renamed Mersey Road & Aigburth
- 17 April 1972: Closed
- 2 January 1978: Reopened as Aigburth

Passengers
- 2021/22: ▲0.483 million
- 2022/23: ▲0.567 million
- 2023/24: ▲0.638 million
- 2024/25: ▼0.597 million
- 2025/26: ▲0.710 million
Location
Notes
- Passenger statistics from the Office of Rail and Road

Aigburth railway station serves the Aigburth district of Liverpool, England. It is situated on the Ormskirk–Hunts Cross route of the Northern Line of the Merseyrail suburban system.

== History ==
The station, originally called Mersey Road, opened in 1864 as part of the Garston and Liverpool Railway line between Brunswick and Garston Dock. In 1865 the station and line were incorporated into the Cheshire Lines Committee. In 1880, it was renamed to Mersey Road & Aigburth.

The station closed in April 1972 but reopened in January 1978, as Aigburth as part of the Kirkby–Garston line of the Merseyrail system. Services were extended from Garston to Hunts Cross in 1983, and diverted to Southport instead of Kirkby in 1984. As of 2026 the service now operates to Ormskirk.

From 11 December 2006 the Monday to Saturday evening service was increased to run every 15 minutes, instead of half-hourly as previously.

== Facilities ==
The station is staffed during all opening hours. There is a payphone, booking office and live departure and arrival screens for passenger information. The station has a free car park with 16 spaces, as well as secure indoor storage for 10 cycles. The station does not have step-free access for either platform and is not suitable for wheelchairs and prams. In 2025, work began on installing lifts at the station.

== Services ==
Trains operate every 15 minutes, Monday-Saturday to Ormskirk via Liverpool Central to the north, and Hunts Cross to the south. On Sundays, services are every 30 minutes in each direction.

== Gallery ==
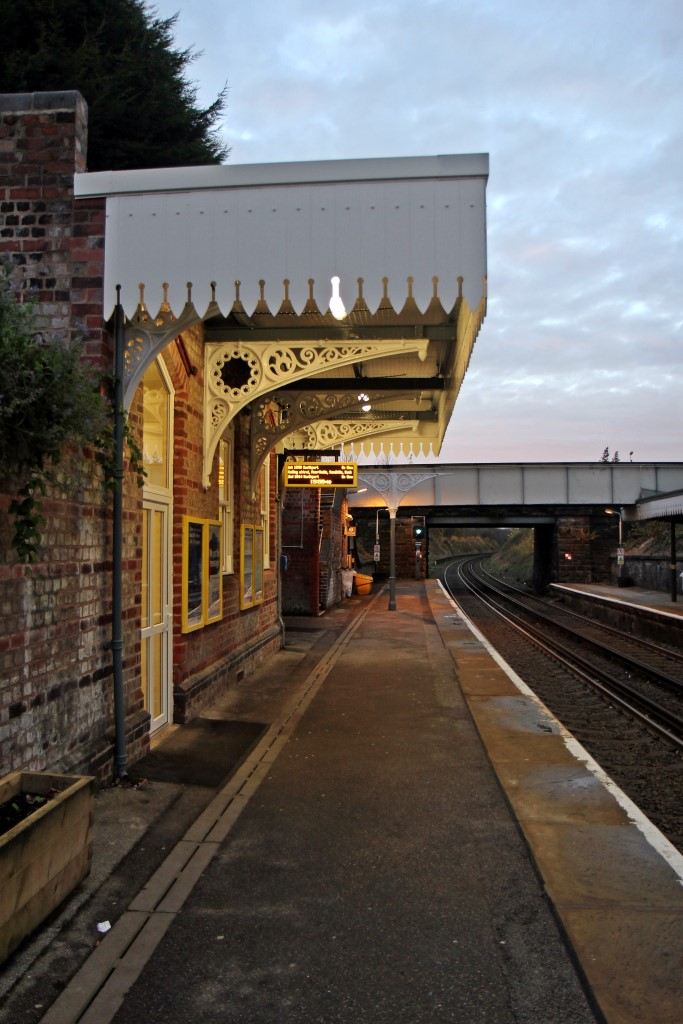
The view along the Liverpool-bound platform.

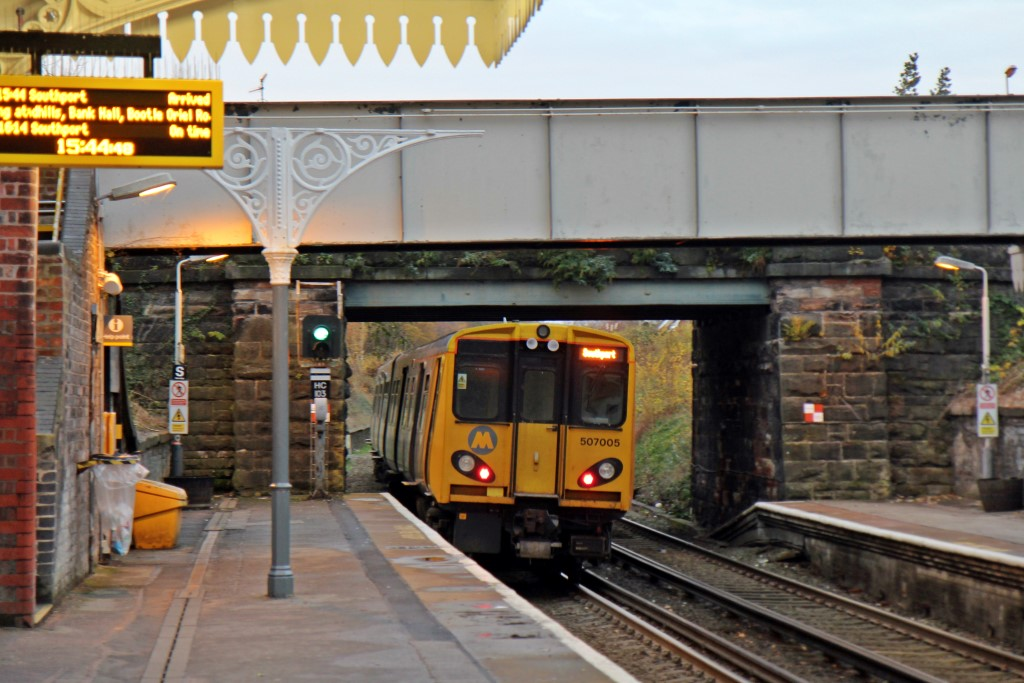
A Merseyrail Class 507 departs towards Liverpool.

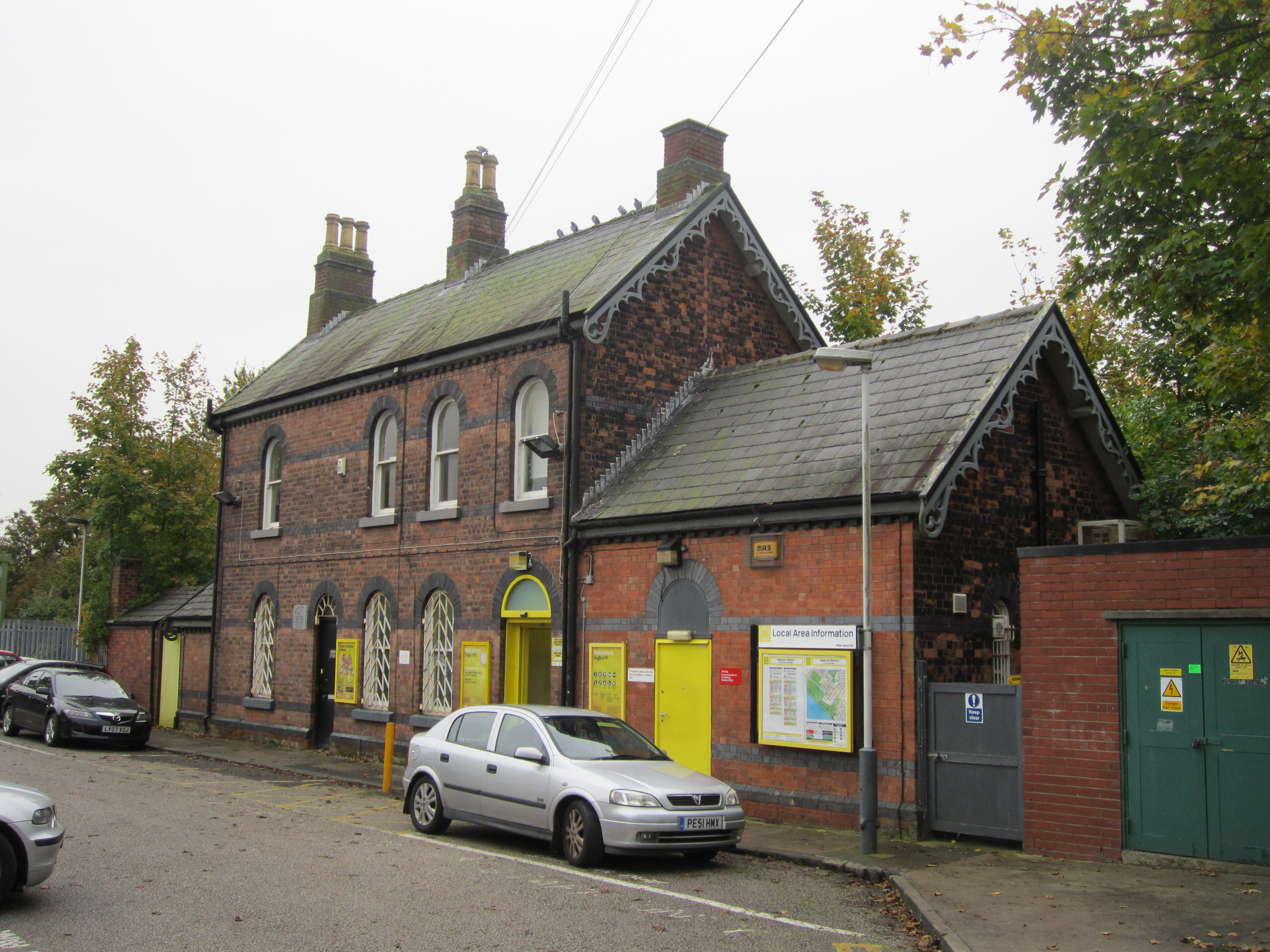
The station building from the road.

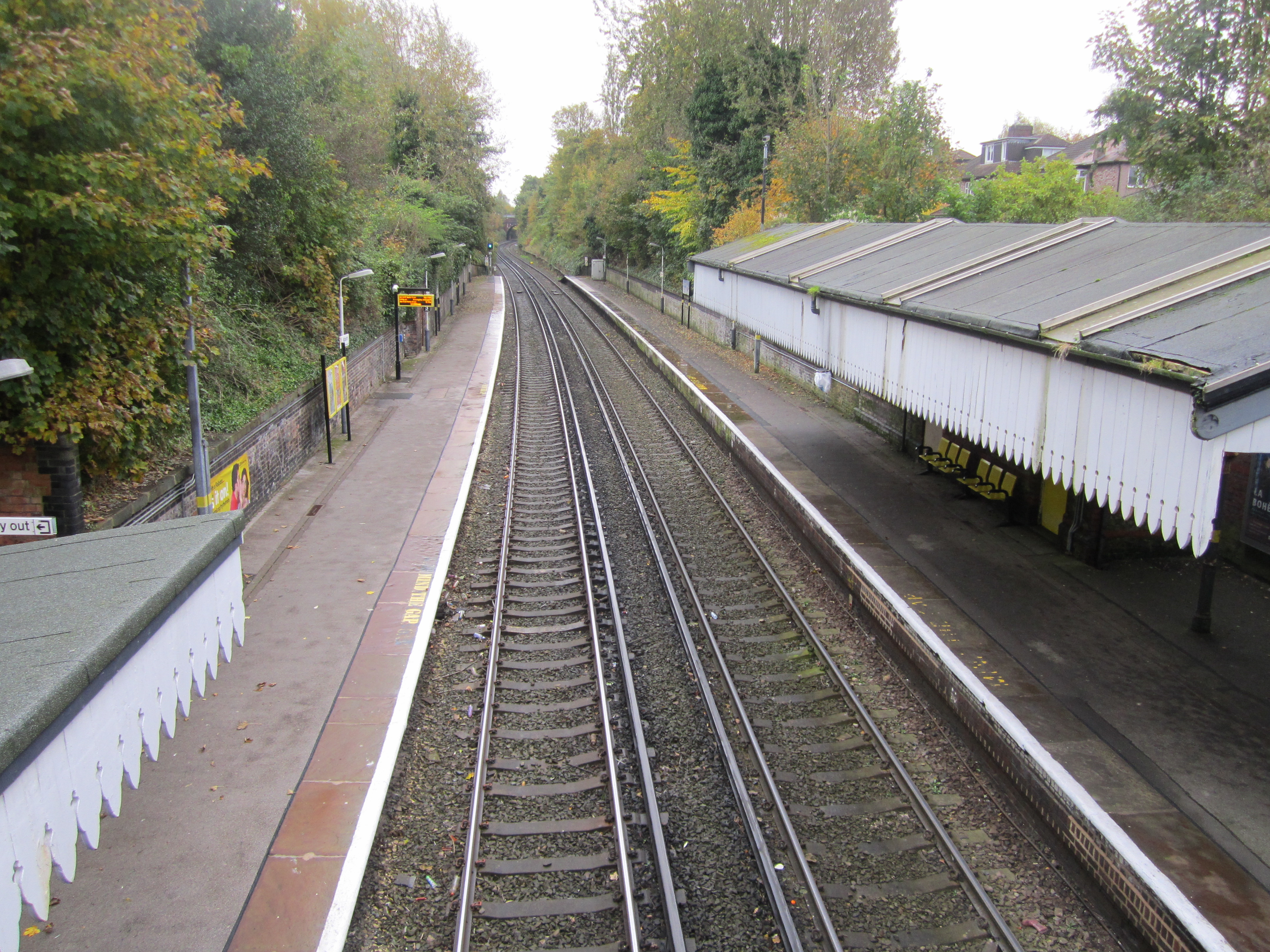
The view towards Hunts Cross.

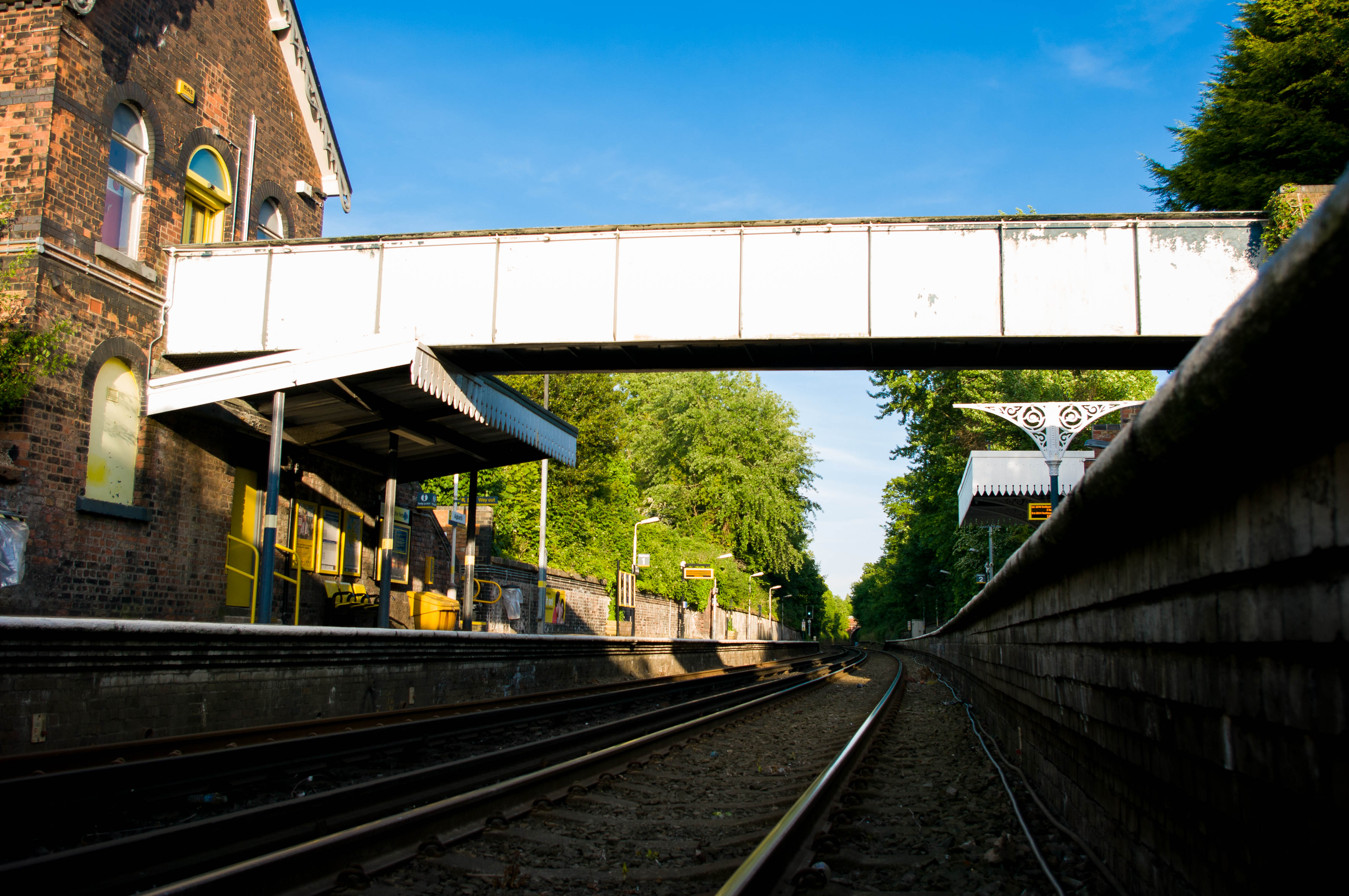
View towards Hunts Cross.

== Notes ==
Preceding station	National Rail	Following station
St Michaels towards Ormskirk	Merseyrail; Northern Line	Cressington towards Hunts Cross
	Historical railways	
Otterspool; Line open, station closed	Cheshire Lines Committee; Garston and Liverpool Railway	Cressington and Grassendale; Line and station open
