= Liverpool Overhead Railway Southern Extension Tunnel =

Disused railway tunnel in Merseyside, England

Southern Extension Tunnel
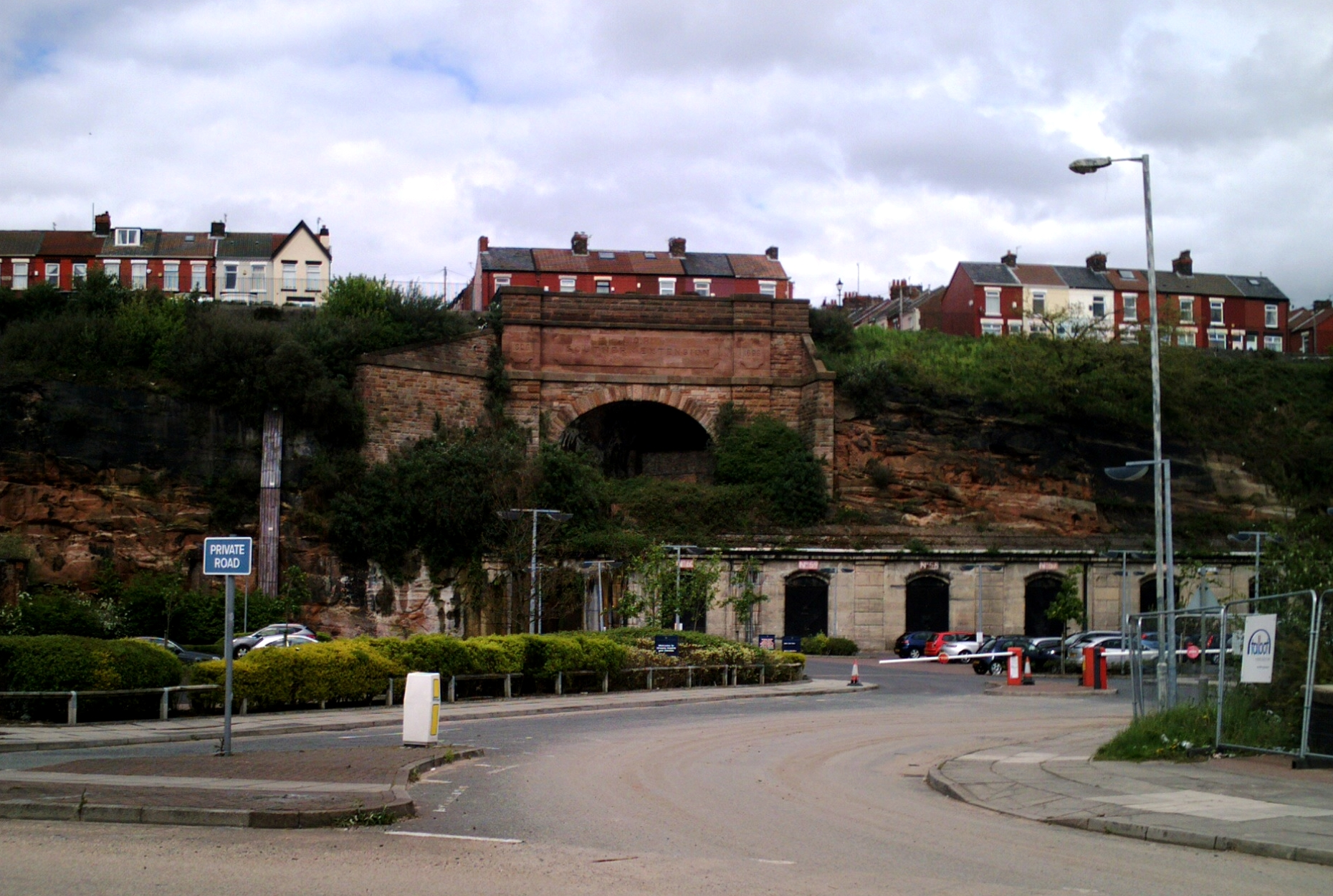
- Southern extension tunnel portal at Herculaneum Dock, halfway up a cliff face
- Interactive map of Southern Extension Tunnel

Overview
- Other name: Dingle Extension Tunnel
- Line: Liverpool Overhead Railway
- Location: Merseyside
- Coordinates: 53.3801°N 2.9705°W
- Status: Disused
- Start: Herculaneum Dock
- No. of stations: Dingle railway station

Operation
- Opened: 31 December 1896 (passenger service)
- Closed: 30 December 1956 (passenger service)
- Operator: Liverpool Overhead Railway Company
- Traffic: Single ended passenger rail with terminus station

Technical
- Design engineer: Charles Douglas Fox
- Length: 0.5 miles (800 m)
- No. of tracks: Double
- Track gauge: 4 ft 8 1/2 in (1,435 mm)
- Tunnel clearance: 19 feet (5.8 m)
- Width: 25 feet (7.6 m)

The Liverpool Overhead Railway Southern Extension Tunnel, also known as the Dingle Extension Tunnel (Note: Dingle Tunnel refers to the tunnel between Brunswick and St Michaels railway stations that this tunnel passes over) or variations thereof, stretches for half a mile from Herculaneum Dock to Dingle underground railway station, which was the southern terminus of the Liverpool Overhead Railway.

== History ==
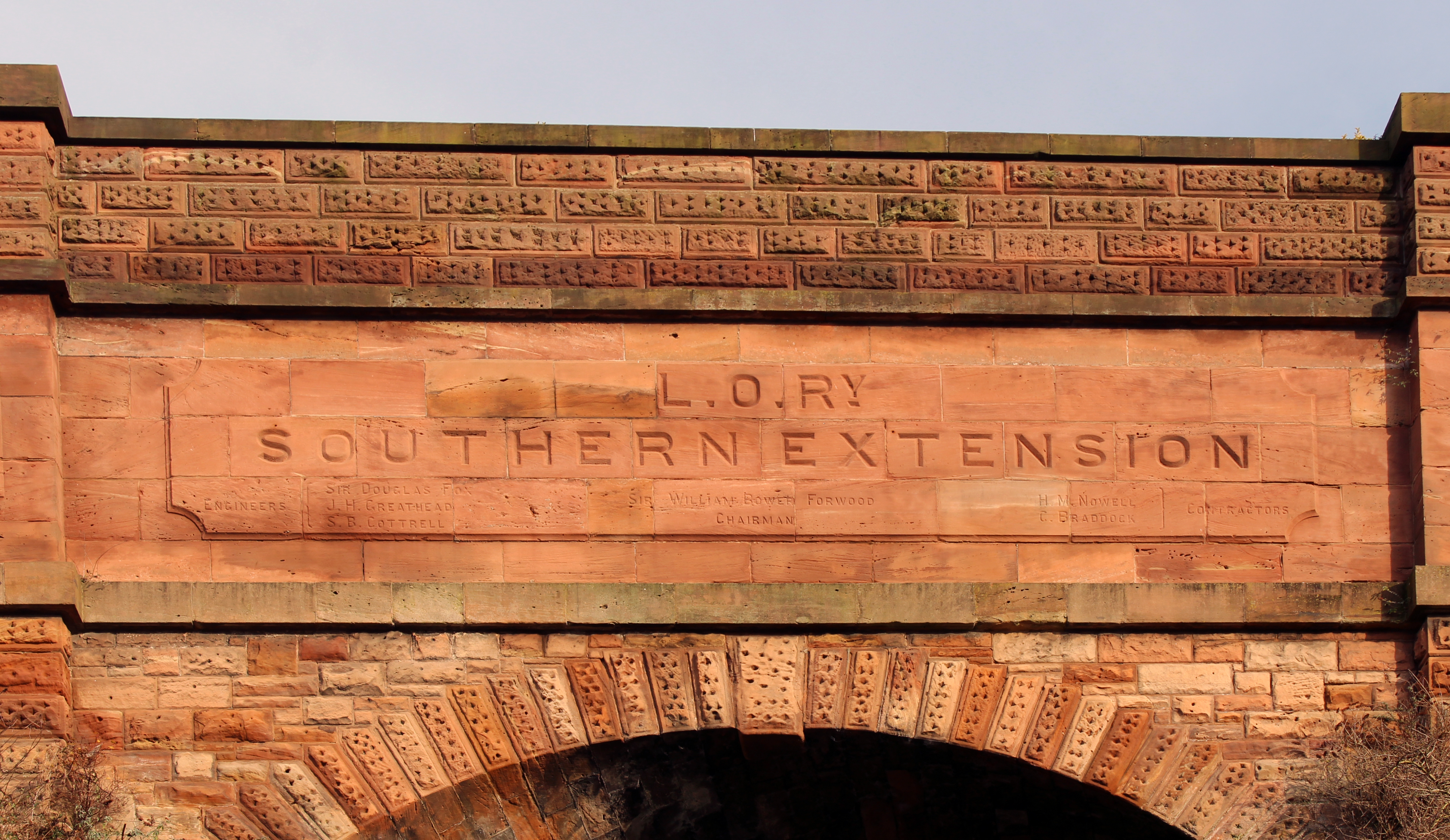
Tunnel portal inscriptions

The tunnel was opened for operations on 31 December 1896. Per the inscription on the tunnel entrance, it was constructed, under the chairmanship of William Bower Forwood, by the engineer Charles Douglas Fox. Additional engineers attributed on the portal are J.H. Greathead and S.B. Cottrell. Contractors were H.M. Nowell and C. Braddock.

The tunnel was approximately 0.5 miles (800 m) long, 25 feet (7.6 m) wide and 19 feet (5.8 m) high. In the station, reached after 186 feet (57 m) the width and height increased to 52 feet (16 m) and 25 feet (7.6 m) to accommodate the island platform with tracks each side.

The tunnel portal at Herculaneum Dock is halfway up a cliff, so that the track seamlessly ran onto the elevated section of Overhead Railway. The track was electrified using the third rail. The inscription “LOR Southern Extension” lies above the portal. (Note: Images show L.O.Ry. Southern Extension with Chairman, engineers and construction contractors all credited) Soon after the entrance the tunnel passes over the Garston and Liverpool Railway railway tunnel which links Brunswick and St Michaels. The tunnel was twin track and ended 123 yards (112 m) beyond the end of Dingle station with twin sets of buffers embedded in the end wall of the tunnel.

The last trains ran on 30 December 1956.

== The site today ==
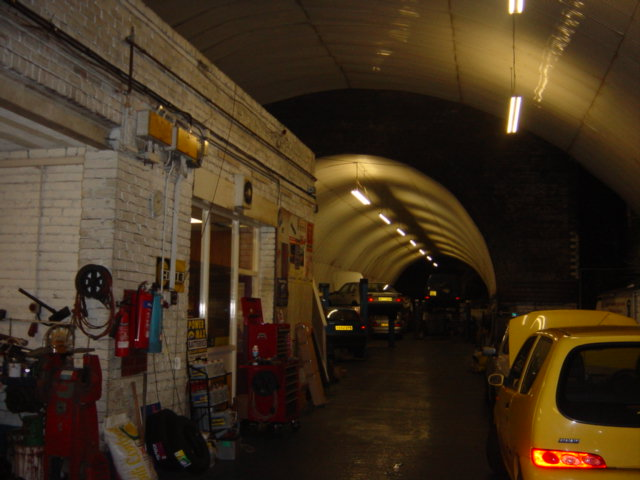
The former underground Dingle station (2005)

The former station was used as motor repair garage until the collapse of the station entrance in 2012, leaving the tunnel and station disused.

In April 2020, the private owner of the tunnel was looking to sell it, with suggestions it could be used as a wine cellar.
