= Cressington railway station =

Grade II listed train station in Liverpool, United kingdom

Cressington
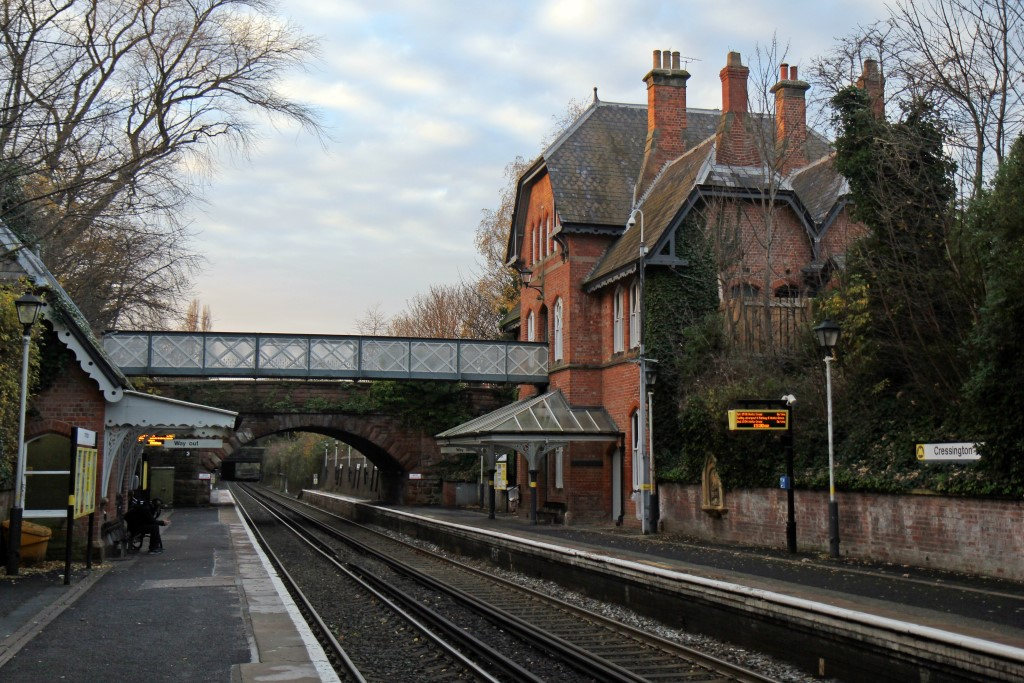

General information
- Location: Grassendale, Liverpool; England
- Coordinates: 53.3588°N 2.9120°W
- Grid reference: SJ393850
- Manager: Merseyrail
- Transit authority: Merseytravel
- Platforms: 2

Other information
- Station code: CSG
- Fare zone: C1
- Classification: DfT category E

Key dates
- 1864: Opened
- 1972: Closed
- 1978: Reopened

Passengers
- 2021/22: ▲0.433 million
- 2022/23: ▲0.484 million
- 2023/24: ▲0.545 million
- 2024/25: ▼0.531 million
- 2025/26: ▲0.592 million
Location
Notes
- Passenger statistics from the Office of Rail and Road

Cressington railway station serves the Grassendale district of Liverpool, England. It is situated on the Ormskirk-Hunts Cross route of the Northern Line of the Merseyrail suburban system. The station takes its name from the Cressington Park area inside of Cressington.

== History ==
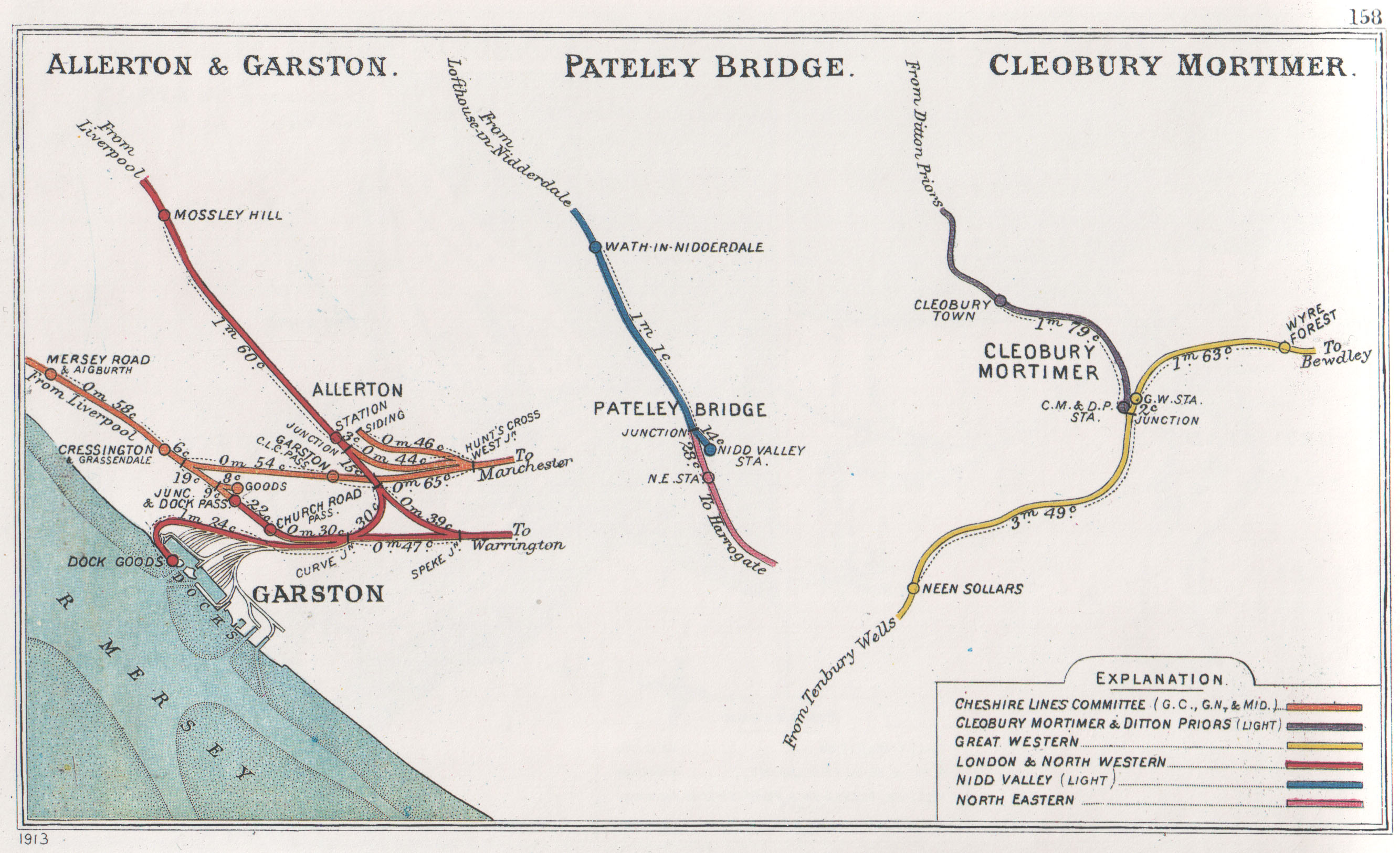
A 1913 Railway Clearing House map (left) of railways in the vicinity of Cressington (shown here as Cressington & Grassendale)

The station, originally called Cressington & Grassendale, opened in 1864 as part of the Garston and Liverpool Railway line between Brunswick and Garston Dock. In 1865 the station and line were incorporated into the Cheshire Lines Committee.

The station closed in 1972 but reopened in 1978 as part of the Kirkby-Garston line of the Merseyrail system. Services were extended from Garston to Hunts Cross in 1983, and diverted to Southport instead of Kirkby in 1984. As of 2025 services now operate to Ormskirk.

From 11 December 2006 the Monday-Saturday evening service was increased to run every 15 minutes, instead of half-hourly as previously.

The station is recorded in the National Heritage List for England as a designated Grade II listed building, and has a traditional façade. As part of the Merseyrail upgrade, the platforms were lengthened to accommodate 6-car trains. This proved problematic, as the station is situated between two bridges in a narrow cutting. Special dispensation was given by the Railway Inspectorate to build the platforms narrower than the 6-foot (1.8 m) width which would normally be required.

== Facilities ==
The station is staffed, during all opening hours, and has platform CCTV. There is a payphone, booking office, waiting room and live departure and arrival screens for passenger information. The station has a free car park, with 17 spaces, as well as a 2-space cycle rack and secure storage for 14 cycles. There is no step-free access to platforms and the nearest station with disabled access is Liverpool South Parkway.

== Services ==
Trains operate every 15 minutes, Monday-Saturday to Ormskirk via Liverpool Central to the north, and Hunts Cross to the south. On Sundays, services are every 30 minutes in each direction.

== Gallery ==
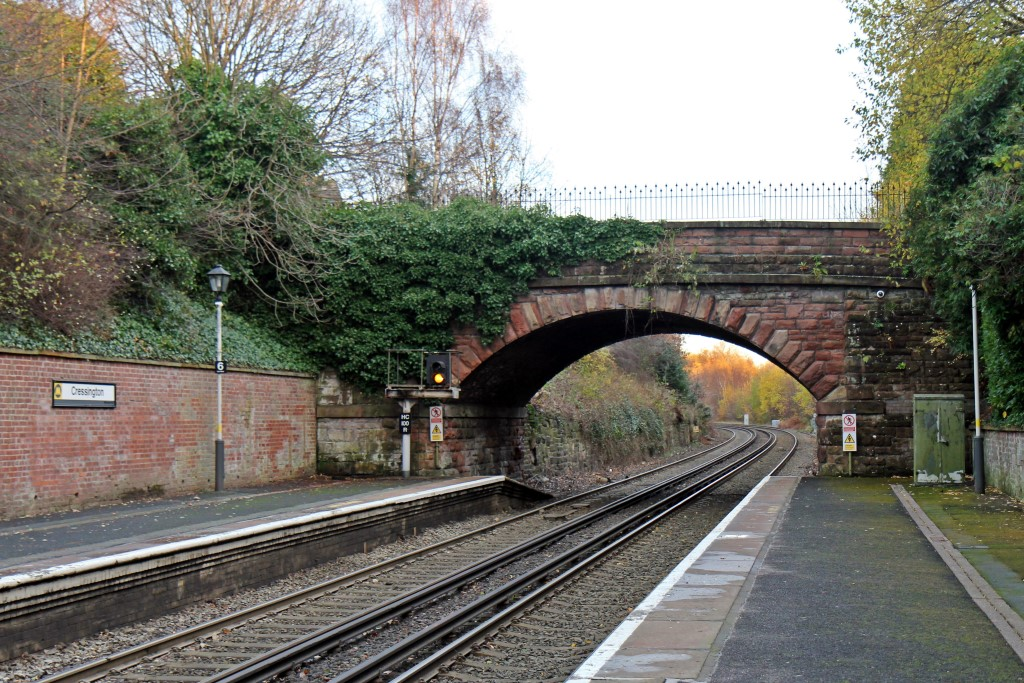
Salisbury Road bridge, Eastern end of platform

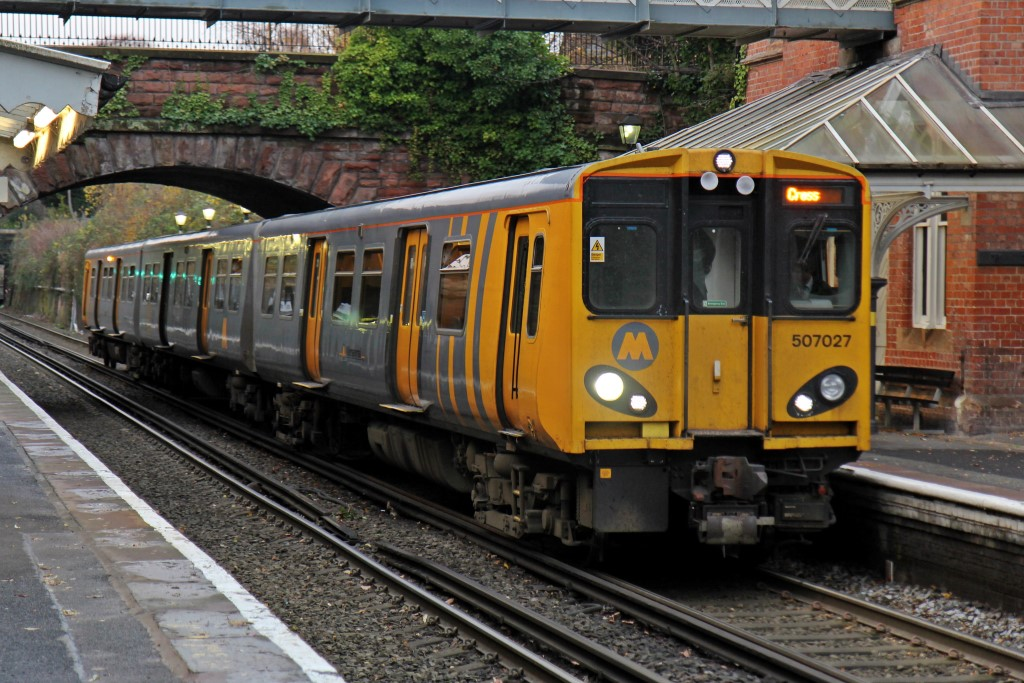
A Merseyrail Class 507 at the station

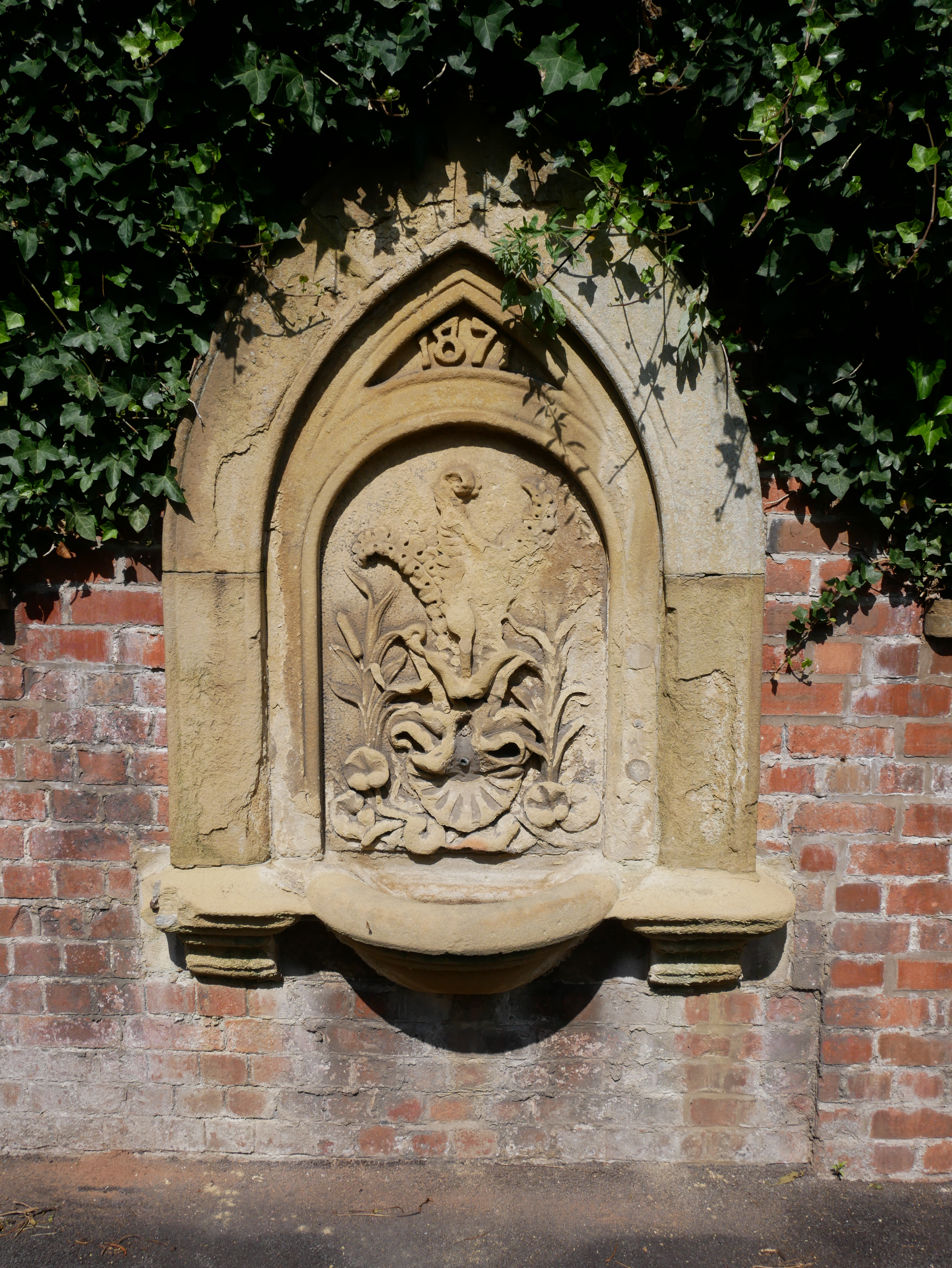
Water fountain, 1871, on North platform

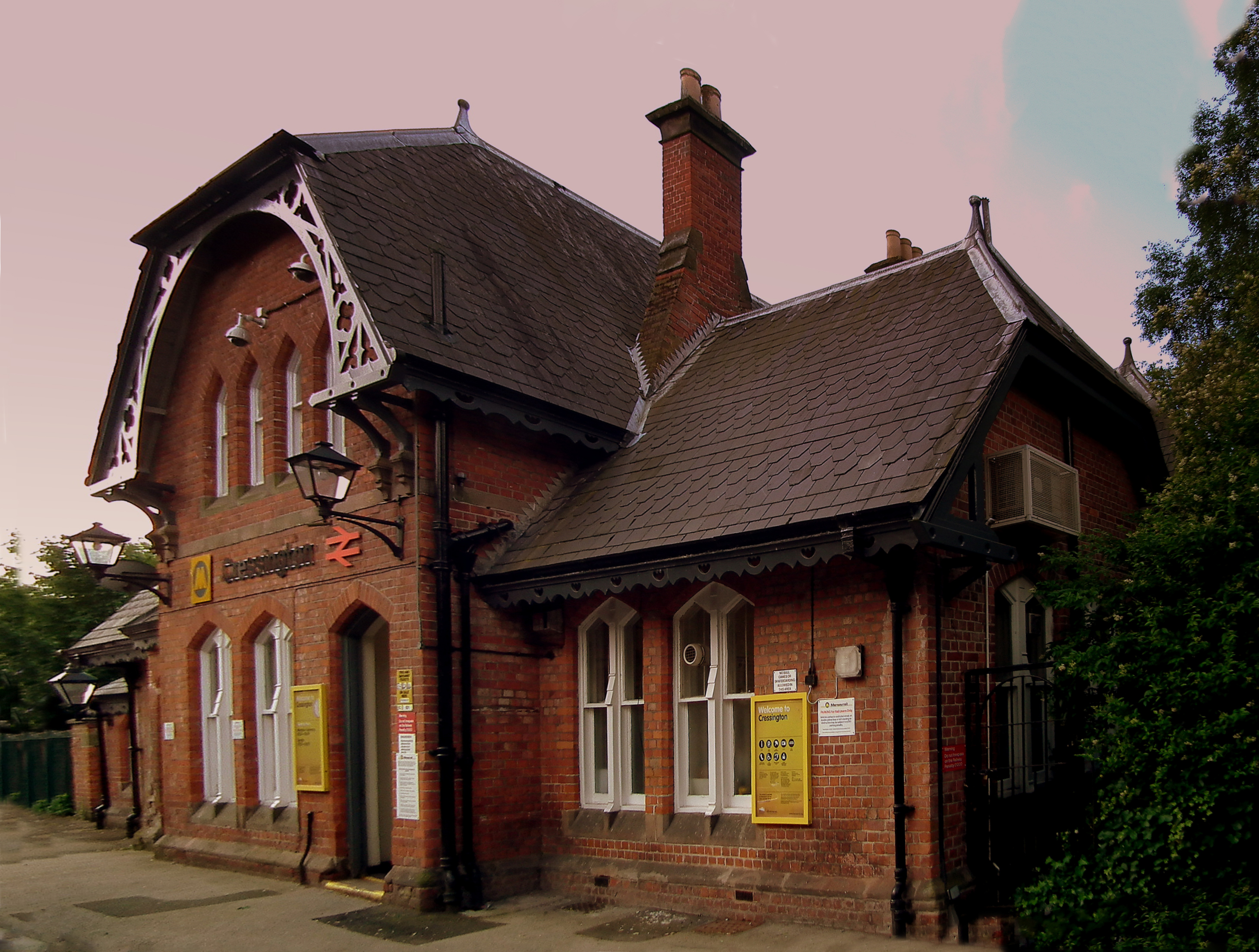
Station entrance

| Preceding station | National Rail | Following station |
|---|---|---|
| Aigburth towards Ormskirk | Merseyrail; Northern Line | Liverpool South Parkway towards Hunts Cross |
| | Historical railways | |
| Aigburth; Line and station open | Merseyrail; Northern Line | Garston; Line open, station closed |
| | Disused railways | |
| Aigburth; Line and station open | Cheshire Lines Committee; Garston and Liverpool Railway | Garston Dock; Line and station closed |
