= Garston and Liverpool Railway =

Garston and Liverpool Railway Act 1861
- Act of Parliament
- Parliament of the United Kingdom
- Long title: An Act to authorize the Construction of a Railway between Garston and Liverpool, and for other Purposes.
- Citation: 24 & 25 Vict. c. xxxv

Dates
- Royal assent: 17 May 1861

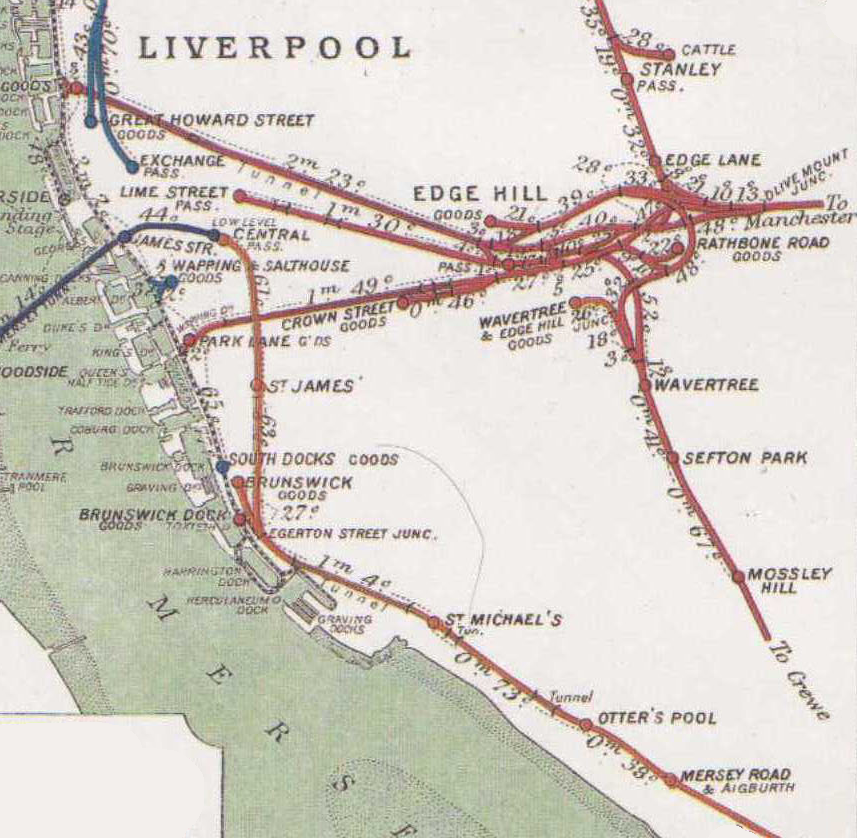

Garston and Liverpool Railway Amendment Act 1862
- Act of Parliament
- Parliament of the United Kingdom
- Long title: An Act to authorize the Abandonment of a Portion of the Garston and Liverpool Railway; and for other Purposes.
- Citation: 25 & 26 Vict. c. cxxiv

Dates
- Royal assent: 7 July 1862

Text of statute as originally enacted

The Garston and Liverpool Railway line ran from the St Helens and Runcorn Gap Railway line at Garston Docks to Brunswick railway station, later to central Liverpool. The company was formed on 17 May 1861 by the Garston and Liverpool Railway Act 1861 (24 & 25 Vict. c. xxxv) and the line opened on 1 June 1864.

Garston Dock station had opened in 1852 as the terminus of the St Helens Canal and Railway Company's line from Warrington. The act of Parliament for this line had also given the company rights to construct a deepwater dock on the River Mersey at Garston, extending the early St Helens and Runcorn Gap Railway further down the Mersey to a better and less tidal port. The company also aspired to reach Liverpool and the Garston and Liverpool Railway would be the means for this, extending beyond the Garston terminus, and following the Mersey downstream to the North West.

== Cheshire Lines ==
It was absorbed by the Cheshire Lines Committee (CLC) on 5 July 1865, whose Liverpool to Manchester line joined it at Cressington Junction.

== Extension to Liverpool Central ==
Liverpool Central Station Railway Act 1864
- Act of Parliament
- Parliament of the United Kingdom
- Long title: An Act to authorize the Construction of a Railway in the Borough of Liverpool, to be called "The Liverpool Central Station Railway;" and for other Purposes.
- Citation: 27 & 28 Vict. c. ccxc

Dates
- Royal assent: 29 July 1864

Text of statute as originally enacted

Liverpool Central Station Railway Act 1866
- Act of Parliament
- Parliament of the United Kingdom
- Long title: An Act for transferring to the Manchester, Sheffield, and Lincolnshire, the Great Northern, and the Midland Railway Companies the Powers of the Liverpool Central Station Railway Company; and for other Purposes.
- Citation: 29 & 30 Vict. c. ccxciv

Dates
- Royal assent: 30 July 1866

The first terminus at Brunswick was poorly placed as a station to serve central Liverpool and almost as soon as it opened, an act of Parliament, the Liverpool Central Station Railway Act 1864 (27 & 28 Vict. c. ccxc) was obtained for the Liverpool Central Station Railway, which would divert from just before Brunswick through a mile and a half of deep cuttings and tunnels in the red sandstone through St James and to a terminus at Liverpool Central. The extensive civil engineering works needed meant that construction took nearly ten years, opening on 2 March 1874. Brunswick station remained open as a goods station between Harrington Dock and Herculaneum Dock into the 1970s.

== Stations ==
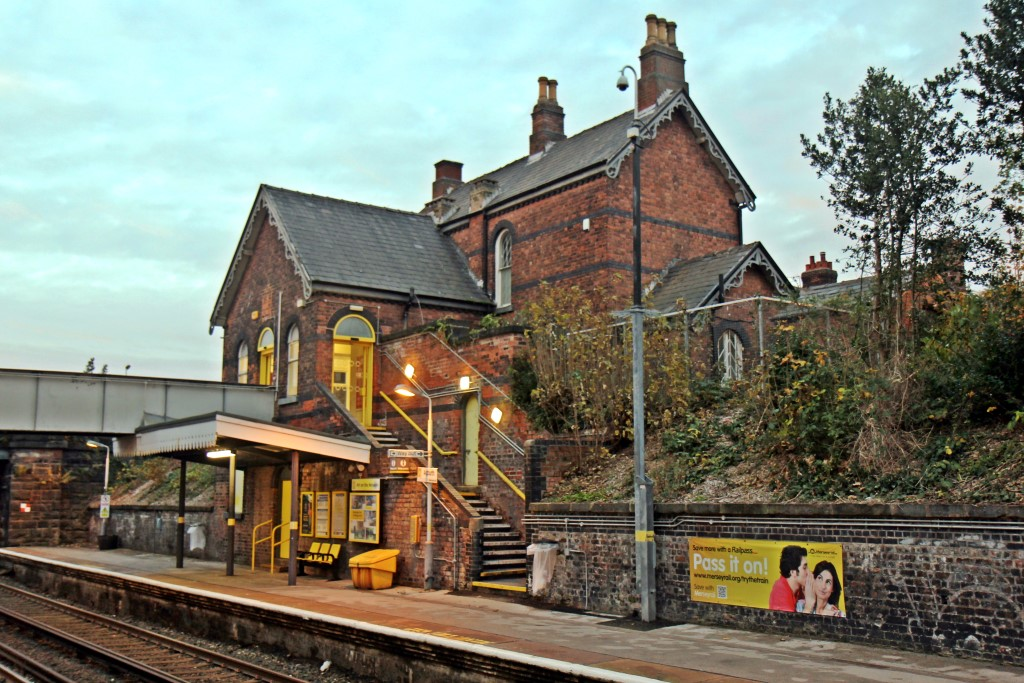
Mersey Road & Aigburth station Most of the station buildings were above, or even across, the lines.

- Brunswick
- St Michaels
- Otter's Pool
- Mersey Road & Aigburth
- Cressington & Grassendale
- Garston Dock

== Closure and re-opening ==
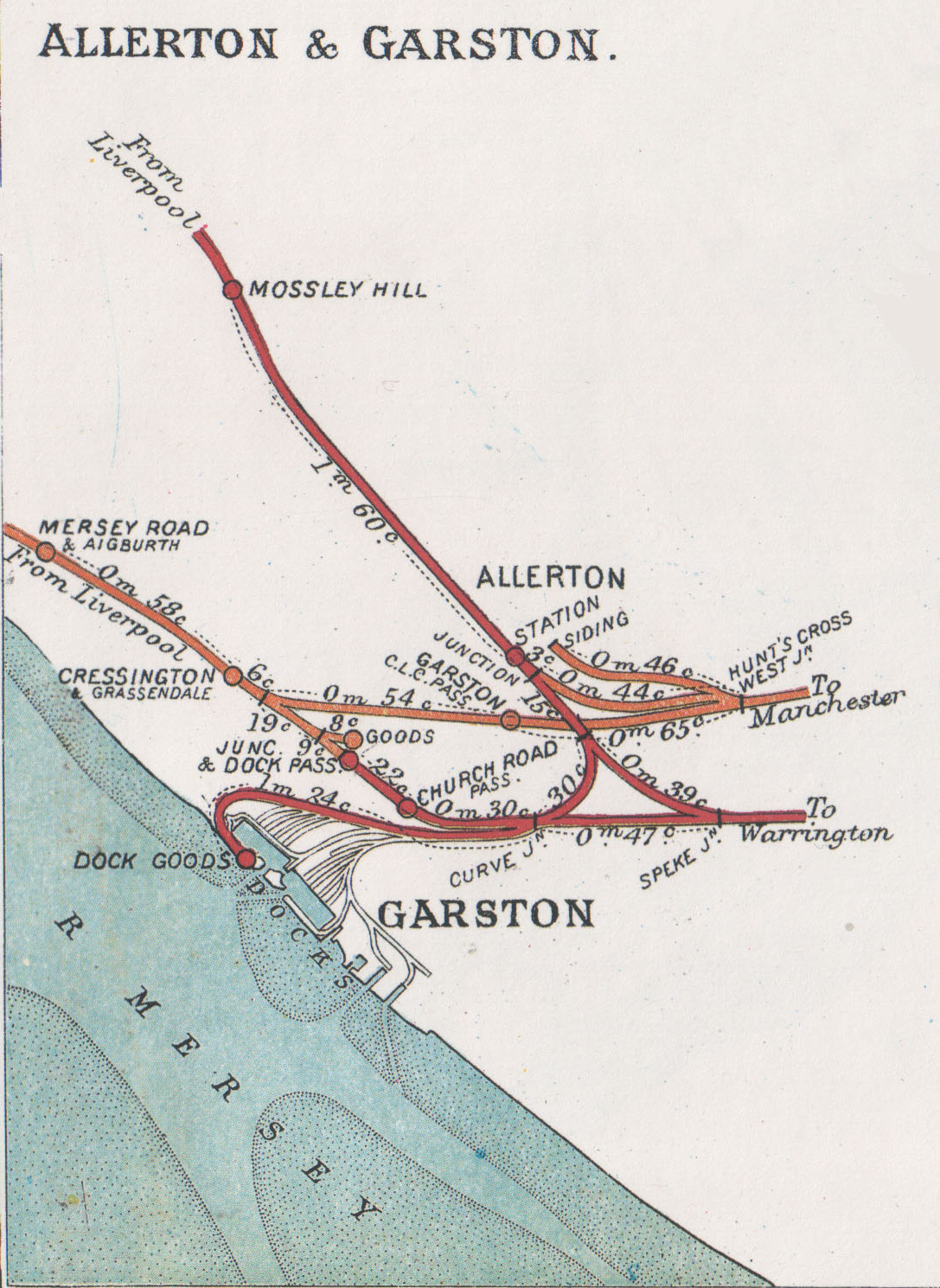
Junctions around Garston, 1913. Garston and Liverpool in orange, L&NWR in red

Although the line had been built through mostly open countryside, Liverpool's southern suburbs began to develop and expand along the line around this time, making it an important commuter route into Central station, the most central of Liverpool's three major termini.

Competition for routes along the Mersey had led to duplication of routes within the Cheshire Lines Committee and against their competitors the London and North Western Railway. Although Central was always a busy station, it was scheduled for closure under the Beeching Axe, services to Central from Warrington and beyond Garston being re-routed around the Allerton Curve, the L&NWR Speke to Edge Hill line, and into Lime Street instead. Central High Level, and the Garston line, closed in 1972.

The line would re-open again in 1978, as part of the electrified Merseyrail network, which integrated the underground and under-river Mersey Railway with suburban lines to North and South of Liverpool. The Garston line formed the southern portion of Merseyrail's Northern Line.
