= St Michaels railway station =

Railway station in Liverpool, England

St Michaels
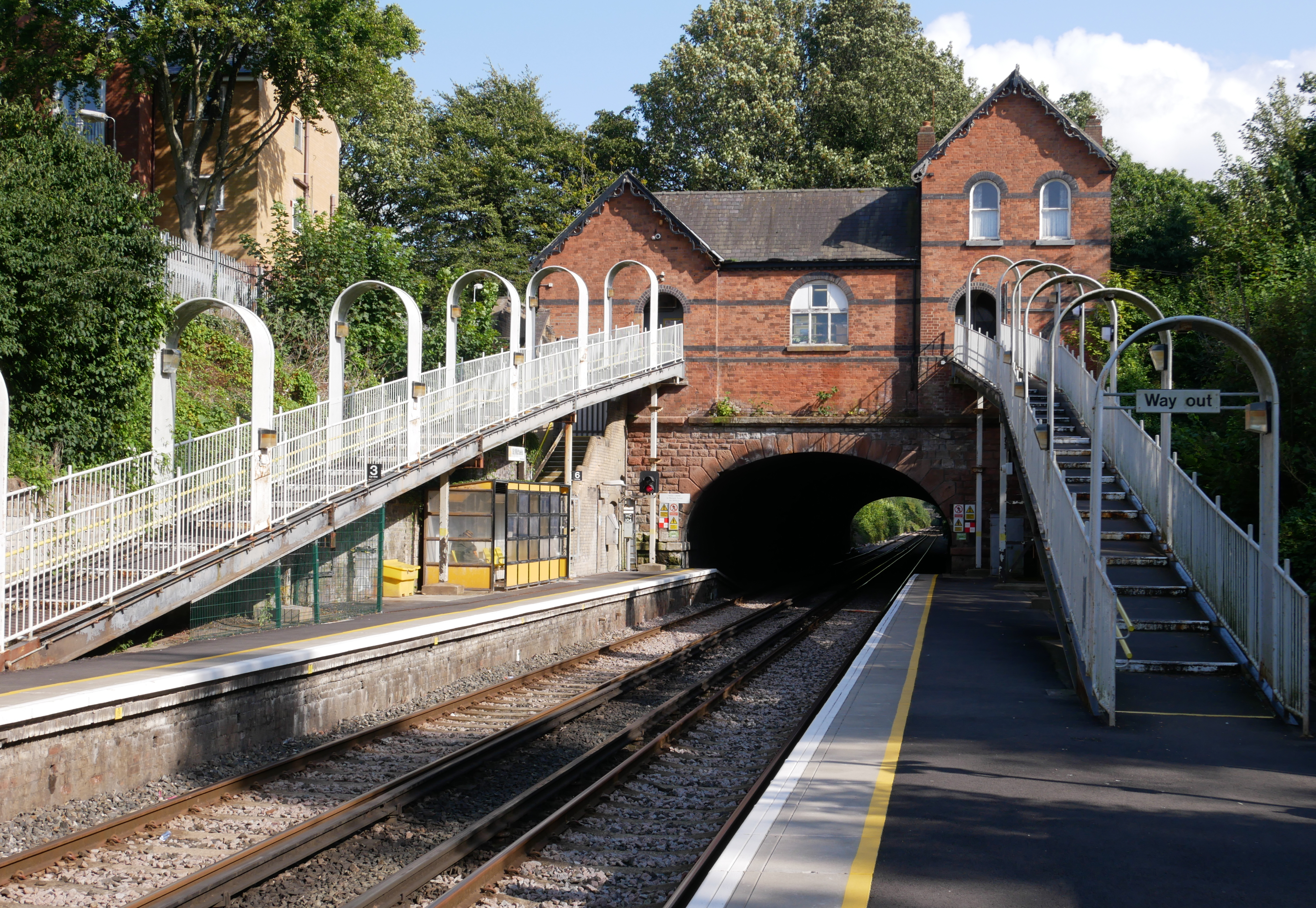

General information
- Location: St Michael's Hamlet, Liverpool; England
- Coordinates: 53.3757°N 2.9529°W
- Grid reference: SJ367869
- Manager: Merseyrail
- Transit authority: Merseytravel
- Platforms: 2

Other information
- Station code: STM
- Fare zone: C1
- Classification: DfT category E

Key dates
- 1864: Opened
- 1972: Closed
- 1978: Reopened

Passengers
- 2021/22: ▲0.786 million
- 2022/23: ▲0.951 million
- 2023/24: ▲1.116 million
- 2024/25: ▼1.015 million
- 2024/25: ▲1.145 million
Location
Notes
- Passenger statistics from the Office of Rail and Road

St Michaels railway station is a railway station in St Michael's Hamlet, Liverpool, England, on the Northern Line of the Merseyrail suburban system. It is situated near, but not on St Michael's Road, Aigburth, a short distance to the south of the Lark Lane and Sefton Park neighbourhoods. The main station building sits at street level, over the lines which are in a cutting. This station has step-free access to both platform. Access down to the platforms is provided through apertures in the station building by steel walkways to a choice of lift or steel steps, replacing ramps which were built for the International Garden Festival in 1984.

== History ==
The station opened in 1864 as part of the Garston and Liverpool Railway line between Brunswick and Garston Dock. In 1865 the station and line were incorporated into the Cheshire Lines Committee.

The station closed in 1972 but reopened in 1978 as part of the Kirkby–Garston line of the Merseyrail system. The reopening of the station was part-funded by Marks and Spencer, because of that company's use of the "St Michael" brand; this is recognised by a plaque at the site. Services were extended from Garston to Hunts Cross in 1983, and diverted to Southport instead of Kirkby in 1984.

From 11 December 2006 the Monday-Saturday evening service was increased to run every 15 minutes, instead of half-hourly as previously.

== Facilities ==
Ramps were installed for the International Garden Festival in 1984 to allow access to the platform, with the original steps to street level (bypassing the ticket office) sealed off. Merseytravel announced in April 2019 that they had been successful in a bid for funding lifts being installed at the station under the Department for Transport's ‘Access for All’ programme. In November 2021, the ramps were removed and the steps to the platform, previously sealed off, were temporarily reinstated. The replacement lifts and steel staircases, accessed via steel walkways from the station apertures, were completed in March 2022.

The station is staffed 15 minutes before the first service and 15 minutes after the last service. There are toilets, platform CCTV and a booking office. There are departure and arrival screens on the platform for passenger information. The station has car parking for 4 vehicles, a cycle rack with 12 spaces and secure storage for 28 cycles.

== Services ==
Trains operate every 15 minutes, Monday-Saturday to Ormskirk via Liverpool Central to the north, and Hunts Cross to the south. On Sundays, services are every 30 minutes in each direction.

== Gallery ==
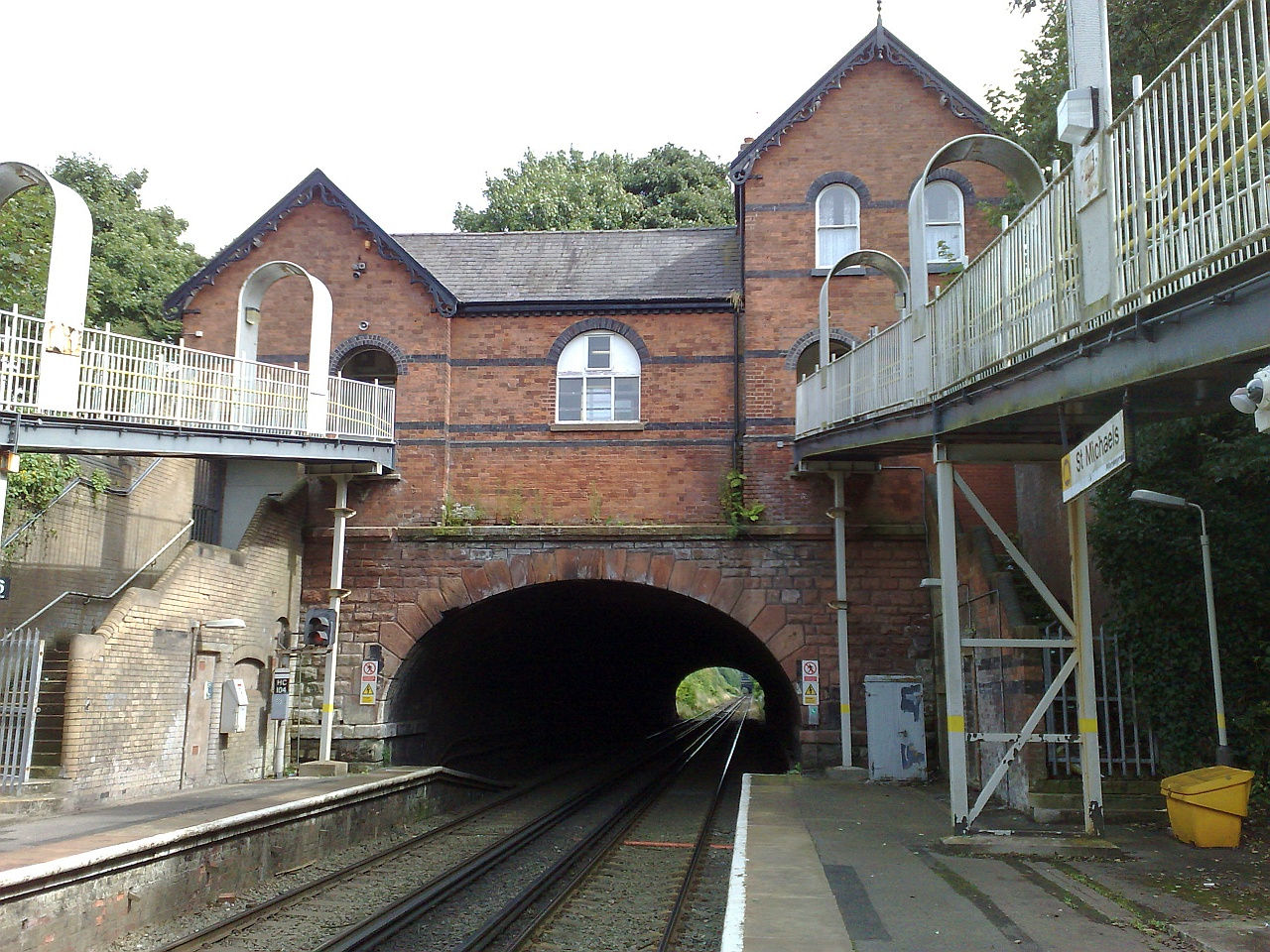
A close view of the station building.

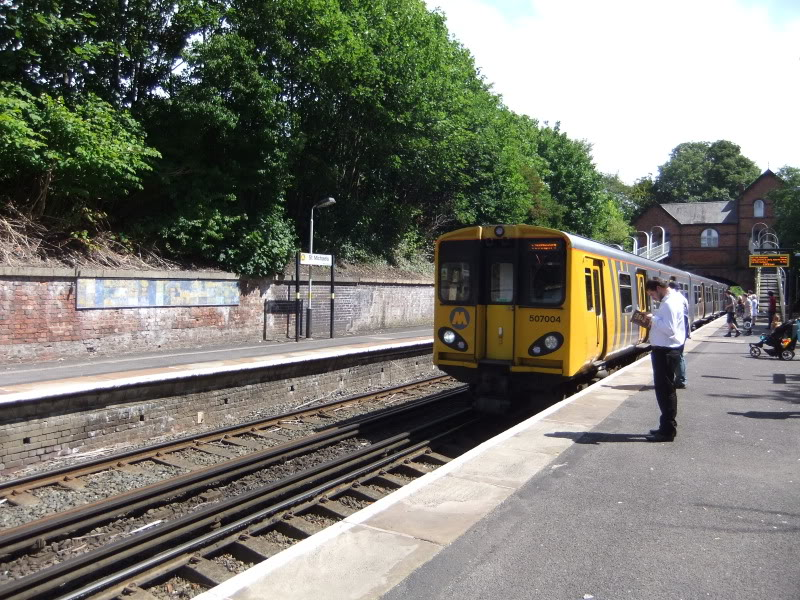
A Merseyrail Class 507 waits at the station.

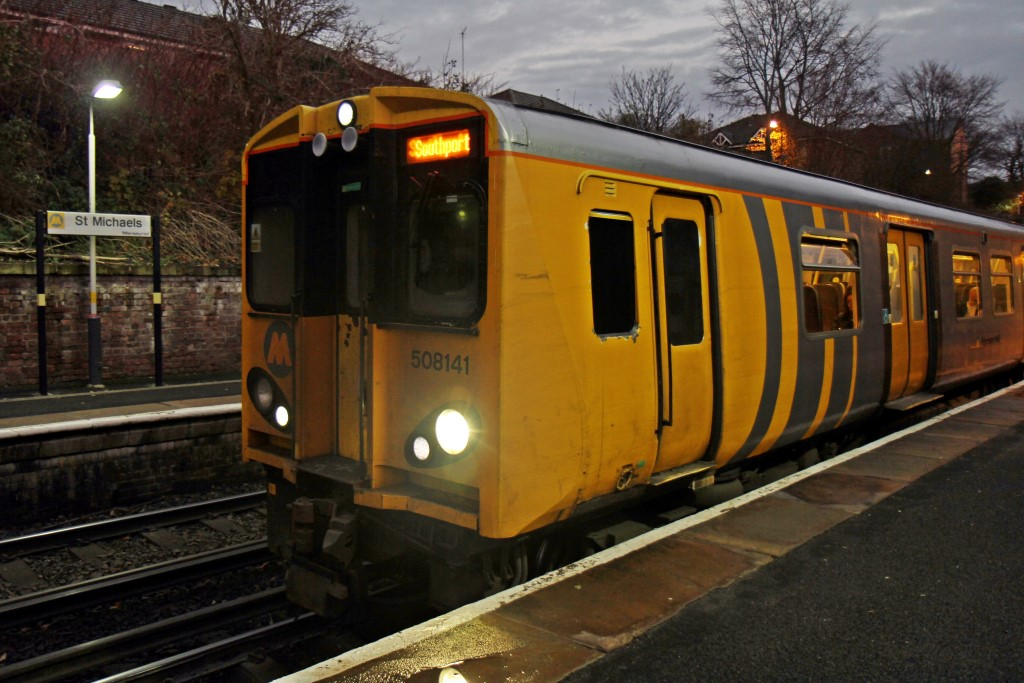
A Merseyrail Class 508 waits at the station.

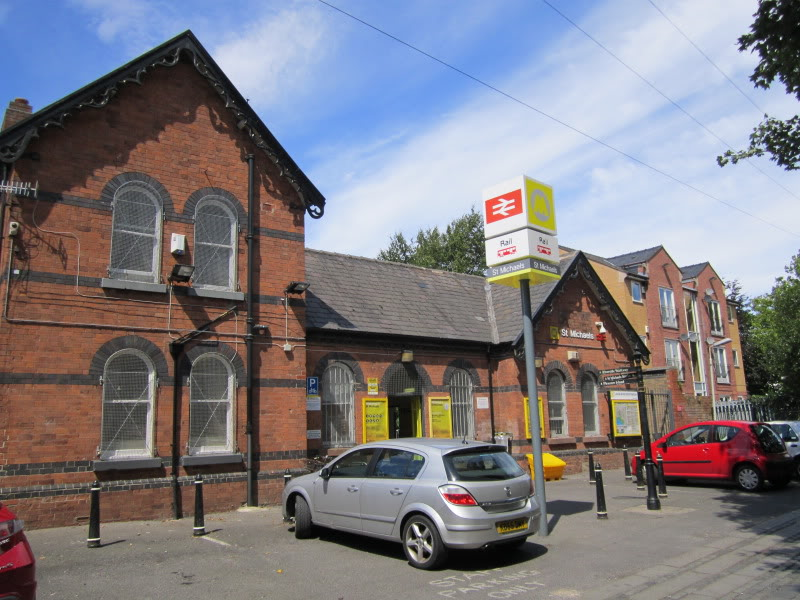
The station frontage from the road.

Preceding station	National Rail	Following station
Brunswick towards Ormskirk	Merseyrail; Northern Line	Aigburth towards Hunts Cross
	Historical railways	
Brunswick (Original); Line and station closed	Cheshire Lines Committee; Garston and Liverpool Railway	Otterspool; Line open, station closed
Saint James; Line open, station closed	Cheshire Lines Committee; Garston and Liverpool Railway	Otterspool; Line open, station closed
