= Liverpool St James railway station =

Disused railway station in Liverpool, England which is proposed for reopening

Liverpool St James

General information
- Location: Toxteth, Liverpool; England
- Coordinates: 53.3943°N 2.9764°W
- Grid reference: SJ 351 890
- Platforms: 2

Other information
- Status: Disused

History
- Original company: Cheshire Lines Committee
- Pre-grouping: Cheshire Lines Committee

Key dates
- 1 March 1874: Opened
- 1 January 1917: Closed
Location

Liverpool St James station in Liverpool, England, was a railway station situated on the old Cheshire Lines Committee line from Liverpool Central between Central and Brunswick stations. The station was the penultimate station before Central terminal station competing with new electric trams. This line is now a part of the busy Merseyrail's Northern Line from Southport, Kirkby, Ormskirk branches to Hunts Cross. The station is located in a deep cutting between two tunnels at the junction of Parliament Street and St. James' Place, opposite St James' Church.

There are plans in place by Merseytravel and the Liverpool City Region Combined Authority to reopen the station. The new station is to be called Liverpool Baltic, named after the Baltic Triangle development area in which it is located.

== History ==
The station opened on 1 March 1874 and closed on 1 January 1917.

In 1913 six people lost their lives in an accident at the station when a train ran into the back of a train standing at the southbound platform.

Parts of the station's platforms survive, as do some rooms cut into the rockface. They can be seen on Northern Line trains heading for Southport or Hunts Cross.

== Reopening as Liverpool Baltic ==
The station site's proximity to the M&S Bank Arena, Anglican Cathedral, King's Waterfront, Cains Brewery Village and other more recent developments in the surrounding area has focused public attention on reopening it. Construction is expected to start on the new station in 2024, and the station would be open around three years later.

== Bibliography ==
- Butt, R. V. J. (October 1995). The Directory of Railway Stations: details every public and private passenger station, halt, platform and stopping place, past and present (1st ed.). Sparkford: Patrick Stephens Ltd. ISBN 978-1-85260-508-7. OCLC 60251199. OL 11956311M.
- Gell, Rob (1985). An Illustrated Survey of Liverpool's Railway Stations 1830-1985. Crosby, Merseyside: Heyday Publishing. ISBN 978-0-947562-03-8.
- Quick, Michael (2009) [2001]. Railway passenger stations in Great Britain: a chronology (4th ed.). Oxford: Railway & Canal Historical Society. ISBN 978-0-901461-57-5. OCLC 612226077.

Preceding station	Historical railways	Following station
Liverpool Central High Level; Line and station closed	Cheshire Lines Committee	St Michaels; Line and station open
