= Otterspool railway station =

Former railway station in England

Otterspool
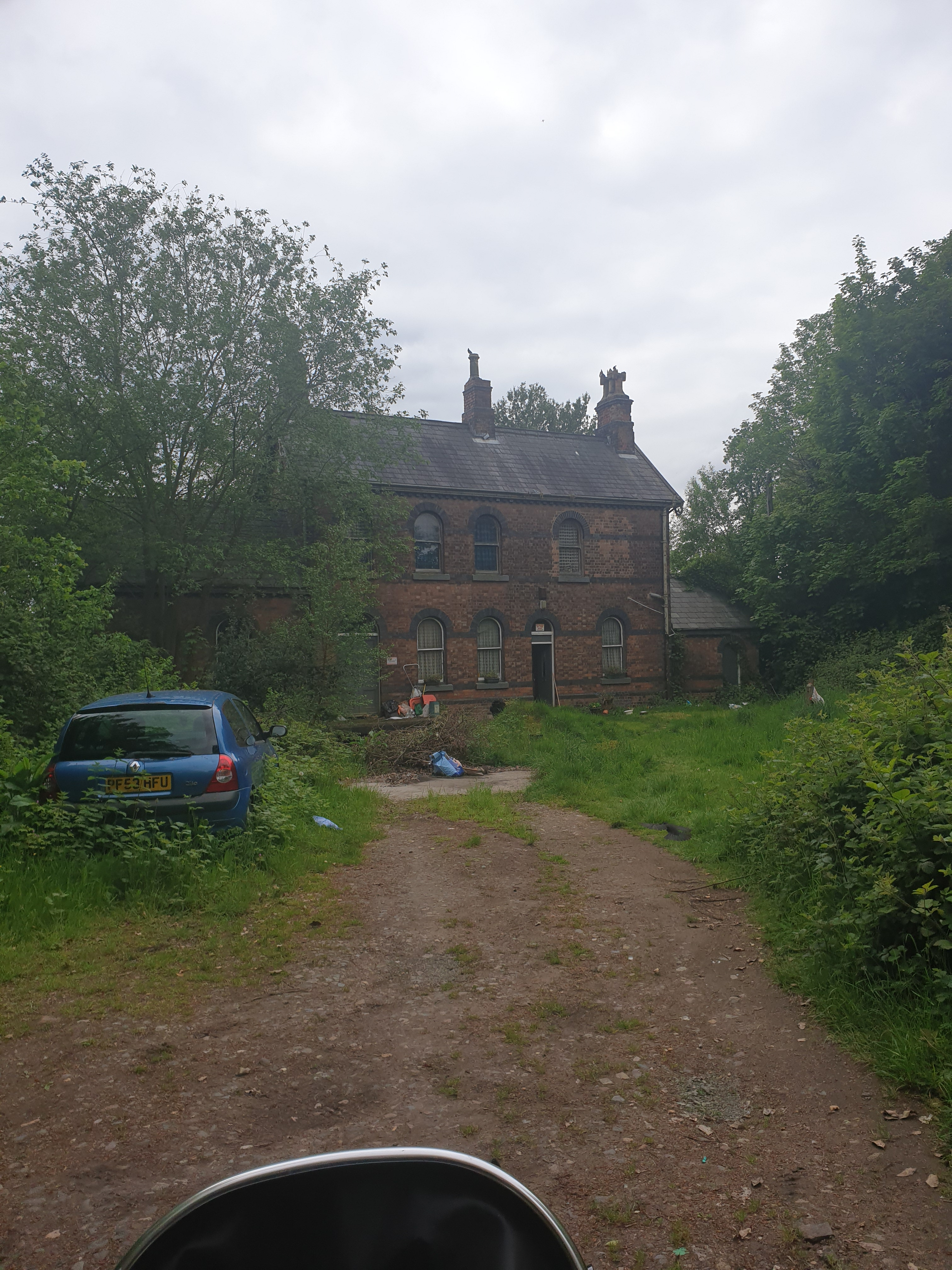
- Otterspool railway station.

General information
- Location: Otterspool, Liverpool; England
- Coordinates: 53.3685°N 2.9353°W
- Grid reference: SJ378862
- Platforms: 2

Other information
- Status: Disused

History
- Original company: Garston and Liverpool Railway
- Pre-grouping: Cheshire Lines Committee
- Post-grouping: Cheshire Lines Committee

Key dates
- 1 June 1864: Opened
- 5 March 1951: Closed
Location

Otterspool station was a railway station in Liverpool, England. It was located between St Michaels and Aigburth stations on the Garston and Liverpool Railway.

The station was built on the site of the house in which the astronomer Jeremiah Horrocks was born in about 1618.

The station opened in 1864 and was absorbed into the Cheshire Lines Committee in 1865. It closed in 1951 due to low passenger numbers. The station was at the end of a long and otherwise empty dirt lane which runs alongside Otterspool Park from Jericho Lane. The lane and the station building still exist, but the main building is now a private dwelling, with a subsidiary building beside it lying derelict. Whatever may remain of the platforms cannot be seen under vegetation.

Preceding station	Historical railways	Following station
St Michaels; Line and station open	Cheshire Lines Committee; Garston and Liverpool Railway	Mersey Road and Aigburth; Line and station open
