= Northern line (Merseyrail) =

One of two lines on the Merseyrail network, North West England

Coordinates: 53.4045°N 2.9798°W

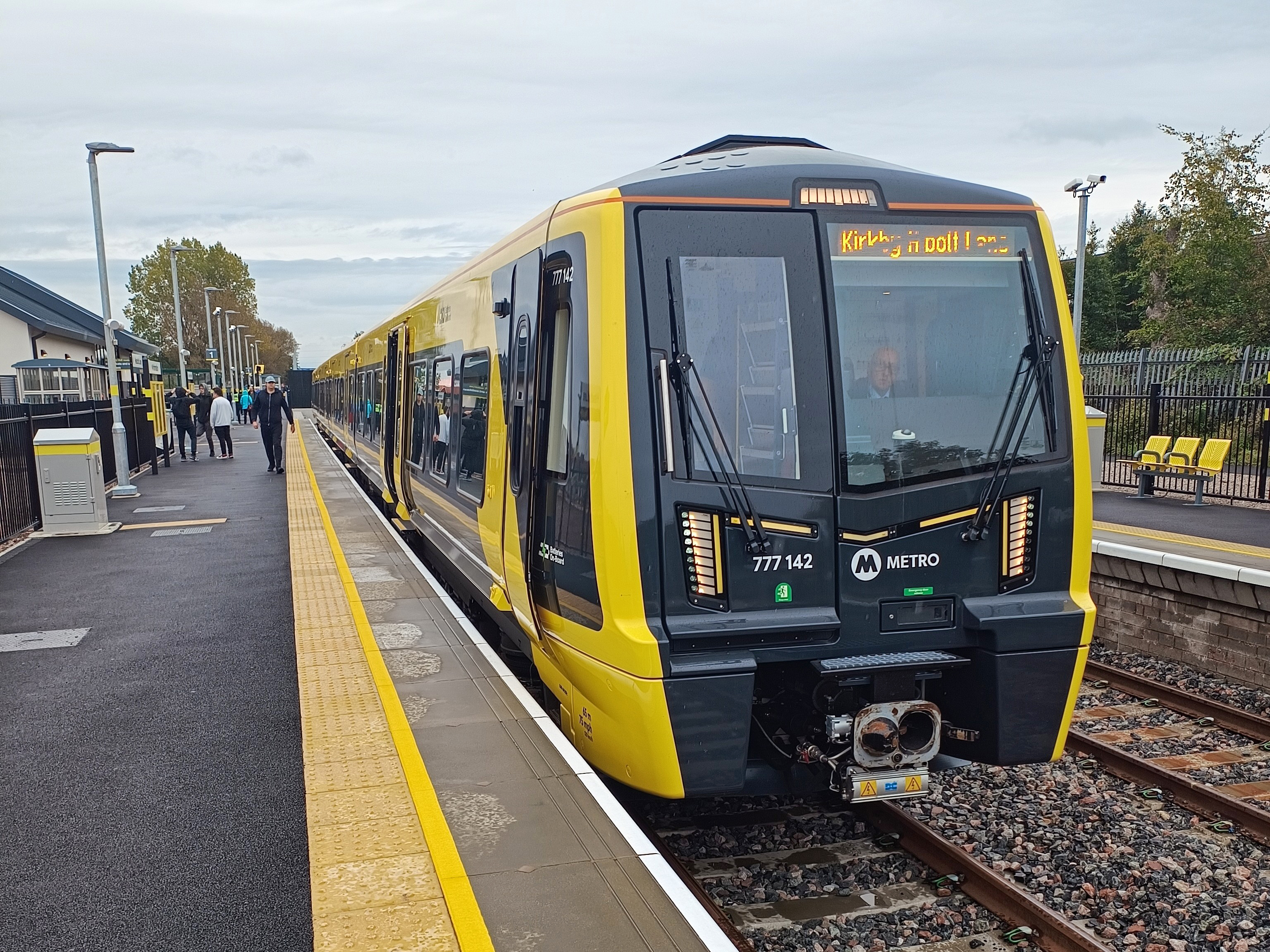
- A Northern line battery Class 777 unit at Headbolt Lane

Overview
- Status: Operational
- Owner: Network Rail
- Locale: Merseyside, North West England
- Termini: Southport, Ormskirk, Headbolt Lane; Hunts Cross, Liverpool Central
- Stations: 39

Service
- Type: Commuter rail
- System: National Rail
- Operator: Merseyrail
- Depot: Kirkdale TMD
- Rolling stock: Class 777

Technical
- Num of tracks: Two
- Track gauge: 4 ft 8 1/2 in (1,435 mm) standard gauge
- Electrification: 750 V DC third rail
- Operating speed: 60 mph (97 km/h) maximum
Route map
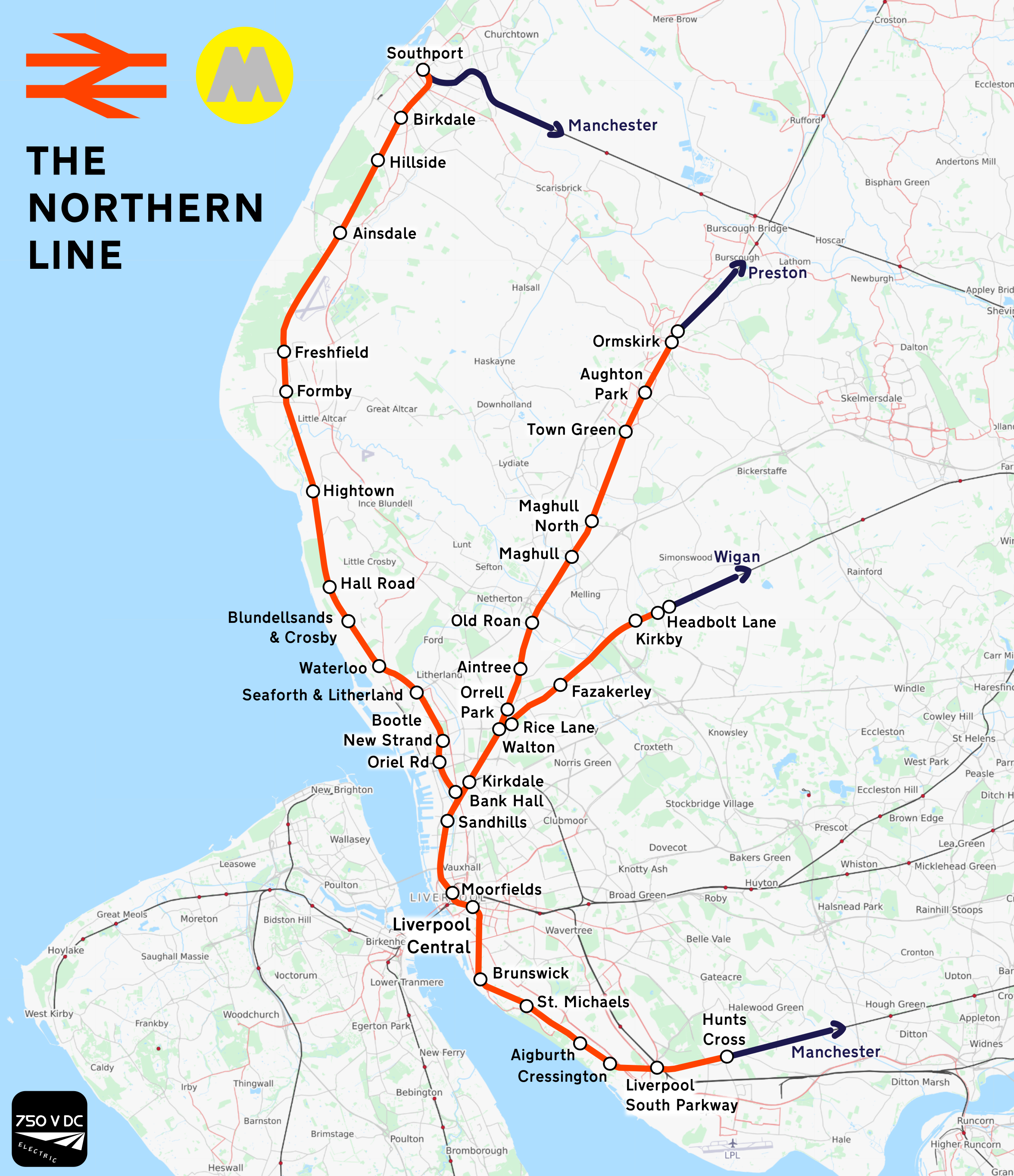
(Click to expand)

The Northern line is one of two railway lines operated by Merseyrail, a commuter rail network which serves Merseyside and adjacent areas of Lancashire and Cheshire, in North West England. The line has its southern terminus at Hunts Cross in south Liverpool, from which it runs in a generally northerly direction through Liverpool city centre before splitting into three branches which terminate at Southport, Ormskirk and Headbolt Lane. It serves a total of 39 stations.

The line has interchanges with the Wirral line, Merseyrail's other line, at Moorfields and Liverpool Central, which are subterranean stations. Hunts Cross and Liverpool South Parkway allow interchange with City line services, and Liverpool South Parkway also allows interchange with regional and long-distance services. Northern Trains services can be connected to at Headbolt Lane, Ormskirk and Southport.

== History ==
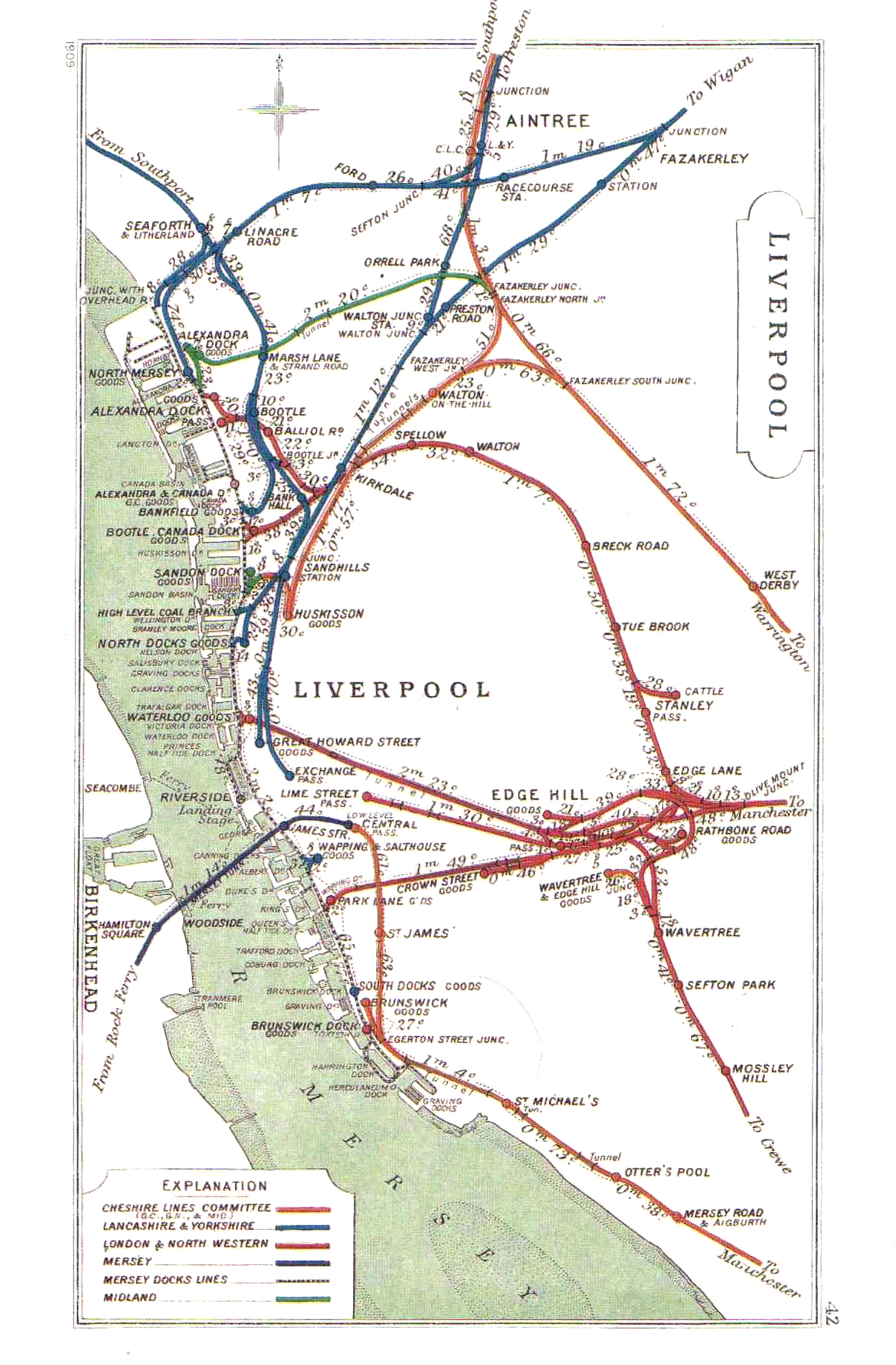
A 1909 map showing former lines

=== Pre-electrification ===
The line from Walton Junction to Liverpool Exchange was constructed by the Liverpool and Bury Railway (L&BR), opening in 1948 between Walton Junction and Great Howard Street, although the line would open under the Lancashire and Yorkshire Railway (L&YR) after a merger occurred a year prior in 1847. The line would extend to a station on Tithebarn Street in 1850, before finally reaching Liverpool Exchange in 1888. The lines towards Aintree and Ormskirk were built by the Liverpool, Ormskirk and Preston Railway, itself also taken over by the L&YR in 1847, with the lines opening two years later in 1849. The whole section between Southport and Sandhills was constructed by the Liverpool, Crosby and Southport Railway (LC&SR), opening from Southport to Waterloo in 1848, and then to Sandhills in 1850. The LC&SR would be taken over by the L&YR as late as 1855.

=== Electrification ===
The line is electrified using 750 V DC third rail, identical to the third rail system present in southern England. It was also amongst the first main lines to be electrified, done so by the Lancashire and Yorkshire Railway due to increased tram competition and the line being at operating capacity. Unlike today, this was originally done with a fourth rail system similar to that seen in London although, from 1906 onwards, the fourth rail would be excluded, with it slowly removed from prior sections.

Early electrification was completed in several stages:

- Liverpool Exchange to Southport, Crossens was the first section to be electrified in 1904;Meols Cop would be included in 1909
- The North Mersey Branch to Aintree followed in 1906, then to Maghull in 1909 and Town Green in 1911, before fully extending to Ormskirk in 1913.
- A new station off the North Mersey Branch would be opened in 1914, Gladstone Dock, not to be confused with the namesake Liverpool Overhead Railway (LOR) station; this would close in 1924.
- A connection to the Liverpool Overhead Railway would also be built, between Seaforth and Litherland and Seaforth Sands opening in 1906, although the connection would be removed with the closing of the LOR in 1956.

=== 1960s to the present ===
Electrification was cut back to Southport in the north in 1964 as part of the Southport-Preston line closure under the Beeching Cuts, stations closing which previously had electric services were St Lukes, Hesketh Park, Churchtown and Crossens. Electric services also ceased running to Meols Cop, although the conductor rail remained until 1970 to serve the large depot near the station, which continues to serve trains on the Southport to Wigan/Manchester line today.

It was also fully intended for the whole main line between Southport and Liverpool Exchange to also be closed under the Beeching Cuts, although the North Mersey Branch to Ormskirk would remain unscathed. This would not go ahead, with various forms of action undertaken to lessen maintenance on the line, such as removing platform canopies, and even in some cases platform buildings. After a study was undertaken in 1969, referred to as the Merseyside Area Land Use & Transportation Study, by the then Merseyside Passenger Transport Authority, the Northern Line would be introduced in 1977 alongside the new Link Line under the Mersey Railways Extensions Act of 1968; this would see the previously threatened main line to Southport and the branch to Ormskirk secured and brought under this new line.

Merseyrail service map, with the Northern line in blue

Electrification done as part of the new Link Line are as follows:

- The line from Walton Junction to Kirkby would be electrified in 1977
- The Link Line would connect with the old tunnel serving Liverpool Central Low Level in 1977 also, seeing Liverpool Exchange closed and the old lines rerouted into the tunnels, with the line south towards Garston electrified in 1978
- The electric services on the southern section would later be extended to terminate at Hunts Cross in 1983.

Later additions and extensions to the line, after the Link line was opened in 1977, were:

- Brunswick opened in 1998 to serve a new business park near to the line
- On the southern section, Garston station was closed and replaced by Liverpool South Parkway in 2006
- On the Ormskirk branch, Maghull North opened in 2016, between Town Green and Maghull, in order to serve new housing developments near to the line
- On the Kirkby branch, Headbolt Lane opened in 2023 beyond Kirkby, the first extension to the Northern Line since 1977.

== Passenger volume ==
Annual passenger numbers from April 2002 to April 2022 were:

Station usage
Station name	2002–03	2004–05	2005–06	2006–07	2007–08	2008–09	2009–10	2010–11	2011–12	2012–13	2013–14	2014–15	2015–16	2016–17	2017–18	2018–19	2019–20	2020–21	2021–22	2022–23	2023–24	2024–25
Southport branch
Southport	1,080,767	1,549,576	1,582,115	1,669,056	1,681,444	3,094,576	2,949,656	2,886,448	2,675,304	2,496,384	3,980,176	4,129,340	4,147,064	4,240,372	4,140,152	4,271,792	4,710,560	1,266,712	3,094,396	3,339,582		
Birkdale	164,753	251,641	256,424	270,277	289,106	820,240	783,066	770,104	734,950	702,168	915,232	954,774	999,758	1,035,000	1,051,252	1,257,834	1,361,614	337,370	851,710	974,514		
Hillside	125,031	158,618	178,252	177,678	180,744	688,812	579,460	590,254	579,538	551,928	552,272	542,006	521,616	535,374	638,996	685,694	761,684	187,474	474,834	507,842		
Ainsdale	210,317	289,260	322,911	328,423	345,791	998,438	955,328	972,616	960,772	899,420	956,960	983,858	1,004,554	1,023,510	928,028	1,016,242	1,127,850	321,382	768,028	920,626		
Freshfield	169,370	249,567	266,415	277,933	283,772	827,718	798,444	795,312	760,336	715,288	740,700	771,648	777,812	773,750	721,168	712,078	773,250	205,926	484,074	498,888		
Formby	279,822	424,875	482,312	525,841	553,546	1,668,128	1,576,974	1,595,890	1,513,544	1,401,584	1,282,716	1,311,918	1,385,228	1,492,202	1,476,462	1,516,340	1,547,950	418,070	995,964	1,062,658		
Hightown	84,188	117,664	133,241	141,686	150,991	439,588	409,956	416,844	408,562	381,300	312,412	316,878	314,282	308,872	311,404	353,172	394,406	98,624	248,152	266,572		
Hall Road	50,377	69,251	76,158	88,355	91,686	288,584	270,198	269,744	256,008	240,056	247,266	259,738	259,346	263,248	266,608	460,036	537,534	131,668	312,314	331,508		
Blundellsands and Crosby	296,685	457,346	518,823	561,676	599,071	1,839,920	1,717,962	1,735,882	1,643,472	1,532,170	1,324,328	1,369,650	1,411,140	1,470,212	1,437,202	1,667,950	1,829,110	482,154	1,196,618	1,365,008		
Waterloo	433,285	601,447	660,922	669,416	720,522	1,136,872	1,022,416	1,014,942	955,878	856,588	1,476,604	1,510,596	1,536,244	1,578,018	1,551,654	1,683,954	1,932,646	553,012	1,237,784	1,324,016		
Seaforth and Litherland	176,145	300,292	335,884	337,209	362,341	832,894	766,468	789,156	761,342	684,324	731,628	750,192	759,314	764,674	790,704	871,670	1,019,398	351,030	715,640	880,034		
Bootle New Strand	345,451	415,685	404,558	348,458	405,802	977,696	909,922	931,806	911,870	842,682	952,994	974,574	976,556	982,592	966,082	1,026,300	1,221,302	398,572	789,718	747,492		
Bootle Oriel Road	57,791	155,295	203,956	249,030	209,041	523,944	511,614	521,576	511,164	475,814	598,050	617,332	642,868	637,608	649,772	787,114	842,670	224,108	503,766	584,074		
Bank Hall	51,477	71,052	74,624	62,692	85,014	197,086	171,010	172,426	174,680	160,480	160,876	159,438	164,114	168,450	172,016	257,006	317,538	93,466	184,840	211,188		
Ormskirk branch
Ormskirk	726,015	693,376	716,362	733,381	770,621	1,026,546	998,858	878,782	715,490	727,620	2,058,604	2,096,328	2,163,374	2,263,204	2,006,936	2,255,722	2,409,296	549,410	1,664,370	1,820,516		
Aughton Park	95,060	86,413	83,012	89,200	85,699	124,736	109,592	96,224	78,530	78,136	179,740	183,340	187,670	200,604	180,544	204,282	218,496	37,232	112,192	139,550		
Town Green	188,160	183,233	203,324	202,425	206,180	259,972	239,100	193,200	149,408	141,760	337,112	346,602	365,836	384,974	338,544	395,678	435,124	101,734	290,144	360,580		
Maghull	394,191	431,945	502,020	610,318	696,791	2,144,046	1,999,436	1,956,936	1,863,098	1,745,454	1,765,756	1,821,492	1,812,534	1,865,348	1,870,086	1,639,668	1,789,936	463,100	1,106,204	1,164,994		
Old Roan	177,332	260,871	284,901	305,589	337,166	918,262	861,176	863,568	815,704	748,070	864,554	896,562	903,968	921,306	930,812	1,006,706	1,185,406	320,184	787,518	847,726		
Aintree	284,514	388,230	376,908	412,132	473,143	1,251,404	1,173,276	1,197,258	1,147,296	1,078,704	1,141,532	1,084,348	1,059,602	1,048,614	1,093,656	1,175,920	1,295,348	301,632	725,908	841,662		
Orrell Park	369,037	452,889	473,979	469,256	491,948	1,257,746	1,170,676	1,192,140	1,186,210	1,088,622	1,031,132	1,040,358	1,032,522	1,057,416	1,035,218	1,124,446	1,313,788	355,900	813,262	1,052,986		
Walton	65,155	93,261	110,471	113,214	113,131	179,148	162,612	164,478	159,384	141,182	269,260	272,784	271,828	261,742	248,896	450,148	571,226	151,334	334,012	418,168		
Kirkdale	299,396	410,808	452,155	441,525	479,342	1,179,346	1,085,418	1,099,018	1,084,206	992,908	854,320	866,218	869,870	893,198	884,302	1,067,562	1,272,022	365,524	850,892	1,033,786		
Kirkby branch
Kirkby	350,098	516,007	560,285	639,337	739,590	2,191,476	2,050,590	2,006,486	1,891,982	1,750,270	2,357,814	2,408,810	2,356,170	2,428,340	2,427,778	2,488,916	2,909,204	877,884	1,899,772	2,060,974		
Fazakerley	215,019	300,552	329,306	318,664	330,843	889,816	832,474	864,108	861,054	789,698	1,061,930	1,088,202	1,088,808	1,108,962	1,135,988	1,250,320	1,465,622	413,542	920,166	899,436		
Rice Lane	64,677	102,525	116,590	118,113	133,723	330,818	307,116	323,310	289,968	281,026	297,262	314,362	315,126	325,322	324,336	580,620	723,792	209,562	416,686	503,810		
Kirkdale	See above	See above	See above	See above	See above	See above	See above	See above	See above	See above	See above	See above	See above	See above	See above	See above	See above	See above	See above	See above		
Bank Hall\Kirkdale to Hunts Cross
Sandhills	178,991	272,009	314,309	306,134	207,944	390,346	446,210	495,458	501,448	471,804	1,250,086	1,324,068	1,321,020	1,323,174	1,325,892	1,088,132	1,298,784	341,714	815,288	778,764		
Moorfields	339,533	309,014	383,815	1,577,540	2,141,398	5,141,655	4,445,984	4,637,356	6,363,434	6,049,491	6,541,235	6,832,585	6,996,347	7,173,567	7,365,918	6,534,016	7,361,420	1,613,112	4,807,882	5,100,886		
Liverpool Central	1,086,536	982,498	1,293,790	7,169,618	8,856,570	19,635,814	18,413,982	17,958,028	14,224,147	13,522,391	14,621,585	15,272,837	15,638,894	16,035,031	16,464,993	14,605,446	16,454,940	3,605,780	10,747,030	11,401,980		
Brunswick	224,476	352,854	407,134	410,813	442,711	1,061,698	979,312	963,252	1,007,874	908,670	829,356	871,856	929,958	1,037,186	1,032,192	1,128,162	1,273,262	311,496	696,788	782,698		
St Michaels	195,408	289,183	365,547	360,976	378,944	562,860	506,288	469,570	466,728	387,532	873,112	936,740	977,510	1,006,394	1,010,820	1,128,708	1,308,664	349,670	785,816	950,870		
Aigburth	146,283	179,458	241,063	246,583	265,442	761,362	696,992	681,774	702,378	614,374	686,496	746,784	833,452	812,582	743,410	864,238	974,200	203,034	483,488	567,018		
Cressington	74,789	120,034	152,383	164,734	170,409	456,042	424,174	421,076	427,480	386,376	463,148	477,112	476,636	490,986	517,108	636,070	750,210	181,814	432,612	484,174		
Garston	141,022	190,778	222,247	42,886	Closed	Closed	Closed	Closed	Closed	Closed	Closed	Closed	Closed	Closed	Closed	Closed	Closed	Closed	Closed	Closed		
Liverpool South Parkway	—N/a	—N/a	—N/a	288,845	419,681	568,822	581,898	641,662	733,698	740,414	1,785,444	1,803,308	1,893,958	1,983,726	2,247,290	2,745,588	2,663,414	573,572	1,460,056	1,812,630		
Hunts Cross	277,961	326,258	443,837	464,367	503,426	1,269,710	1,190,934	1,172,150	1,160,738	1,062,798	1,289,590	1,364,502	1,410,366	1,450,268	1,446,138	1,452,752	1,827,454	530,966	1,155,580	1,307,550		
The annual passenger usage is based on sales of tickets in stated financial years from Office of Rail and Road estimates of station usage. The statistics are for passengers arriving and departing from each station and cover twelve-month periods that start in April. Methodology may vary year on year. Usage since the period 2019–20 have been affected by the COVID-19 pandemic, especially the period 2020–23.

== Services ==
Services from Hunts Cross generally continue to Southport, while trains to Ormskirk and Headbolt Lane start at Liverpool Central. Daytime trains operate every 15 minutes on each of the three routes, but every 30 minutes evenings and Sundays.

Special timetables are implemented for major events, such as the Grand National meeting at Aintree Racecourse and tournaments at Royal Birkdale Golf Club. These involve changing services on all branches and the closure of stations in anticipation of overcrowding risks.

There are a total of 12 trains per hour (tph) running on the central section between Sandhills and Liverpool Central. The service pattern is shown below.

Northern line service pattern
Route	Frequency (tph)	
Route	Monday–Saturday	Sunday
Ormskirk–Sandhills–Liverpool Central–Liverpool South Parkway–Hunts Cross	4	2
Southport–Formby–Sandhills–Liverpool Central	4	2
Headbolt Lane–Sandhills–Liverpool Central	4	2

== Future ==
Plans to reopen St James station have been proposed. Merseytravel agreed to work with Liverpool Vision in March 2014 to investigate the cost of reopening the station and its projected usage. Merseytravel listed the reopening of St James station as a top rail project on a Rail Development and Delivery Committee report in 2016. The plans were confirmed with the station to be named Liverpool Baltic, construction is planned to begin in 2025.

As part of Lancashire County Council's plans to build a new station at Skelmersdale, it proposed an extension to the Northern line that would change the terminus of the Kirkby branch of the line from Headbolt Lane to Skelmersdale. The proposals could see Merseyrail services also passing through Rainford. By September 2017, Merseytravel and Lancashire County Council had committed £5 million of funding to the scheme. Merseytravel believe the scheme could cost around £300 million to develop and could be ready in a decade.

The combined authority's Long Term Rail Strategy states that a review in 2020 to introduce new Merseyrail battery trains will be undertaken, in view to add Preston in to the network by extending the Northern line from Ormskirk. It adds that "the potential use of battery-powered Merseyrail units may improve the business case."

== See also ==
- Lancashire and Yorkshire Railway electric units
- A59 road, which follows the same route.
