= Garston Dock railway station =

Railway station situated on Dock Road, Liverpool

Garston Dock Railway Station

General information
- Location: Garston, Liverpool, Liverpool; England
- Coordinates: 53.355225°N 2.90313°W
- Grid reference: SJ401846
- Platforms: 2

Other information
- Status: Disused

History
- Original company: St Helens Railway
- Pre-grouping: LNWR
- Post-grouping: London Midland and Scottish Railway

Key dates
- 1852: Opened
- 5 April 1917: closed
- 5 May 1919: reopened
- 16 June 1947: Closed
Location

Garston Dock railway station served Garston, Liverpool, Merseyside, England and Garston Docks. It was situated on the east side of Dock Road.

== History ==
The station opened on 1 July 1852 as the western terminal of the St Helens and Runcorn Gap Railway and closed 16 June 1947. Soon after the station was opened the Garston and Liverpool Railway was opened bringing the St Helens Railway Liverpool terminus to Brunswick. However, the Cheshire Lines Committee took over this line to connect in Liverpool to Manchester Line to central Liverpool. So, the LNWR which by this time had acquired the St Helens Railway built Hunts Cross chord allowing its trains to access its Liverpool Lime Street railway station.

Preceding station	Disused railways	Following station
Terminus	LNWR; St Helens Railway	Church Road Garston
Cressington	CLC; Garston and Liverpool Railway	Terminus

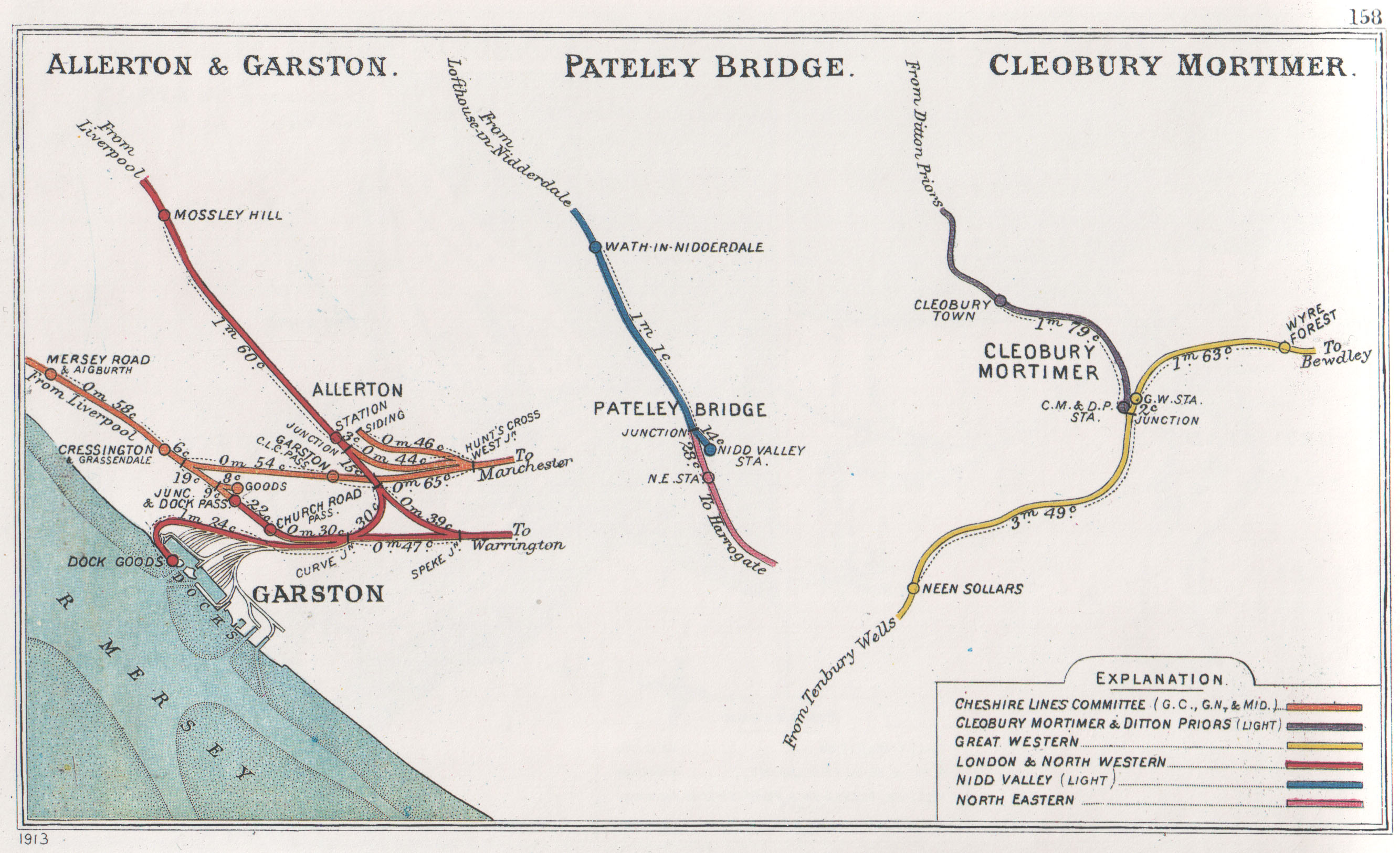
A 1913 Railway Clearing House map (left) of railways in the vicinity of Garston Dock

== See also ==
- Garston railway station (Merseyside)
- Garston and Liverpool Railway
