= Garston railway station (Merseyside) =

Former railway station in Liverpool, England

Garston (Merseyside)
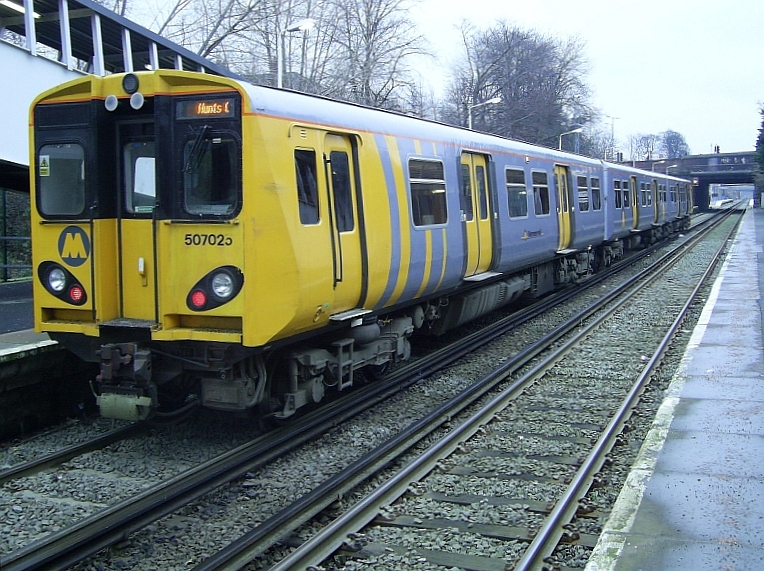
- A Class 507 unit at Garston (Merseyside) railway station working on a service to Hunts Cross, with Liverpool South Parkway being seen in the works at the back of the station.

General information
- Location: Garston, Liverpool; England
- Coordinates: 53.3572°N 2.8946°W
- Grid reference: SJ405848
- Platforms: 2

Other information
- Status: Disused

History
- Original company: Cheshire Lines Committee
- Pre-grouping: Cheshire Lines Committee
- Post-grouping: CLC; London Midland Region of British Railways; Merseyrail

Key dates
- 1 April 1874: Opened as Garston
- 17 April 1972: Closed
- 2 January 1978: Reopened as Garston (Lancs)
- 1979: Renamed Garston (Merseyside)
- 10 June 2006: Closed

Passengers
- 2002/03: ▲141,022
- 2003/04: Statistics not produced
- 2004/05: ▲190,778
- 2005/06: ▲222,247
- 2006/07: ▼42,886
Location
Notes
- Passenger statistics from the Office of Rail and Road

Garston railway station was a railway station in the Garston district of Liverpool, England. The station was located on the Northern Line of the Merseyrail suburban rail network. The station was closed in 2006 when it was replaced by Liverpool South Parkway, which is a combined bus and rail interchange. The proximity of the stations was so close the platforms of South Parkway nearly merged onto the Garston station's platforms.

== History ==
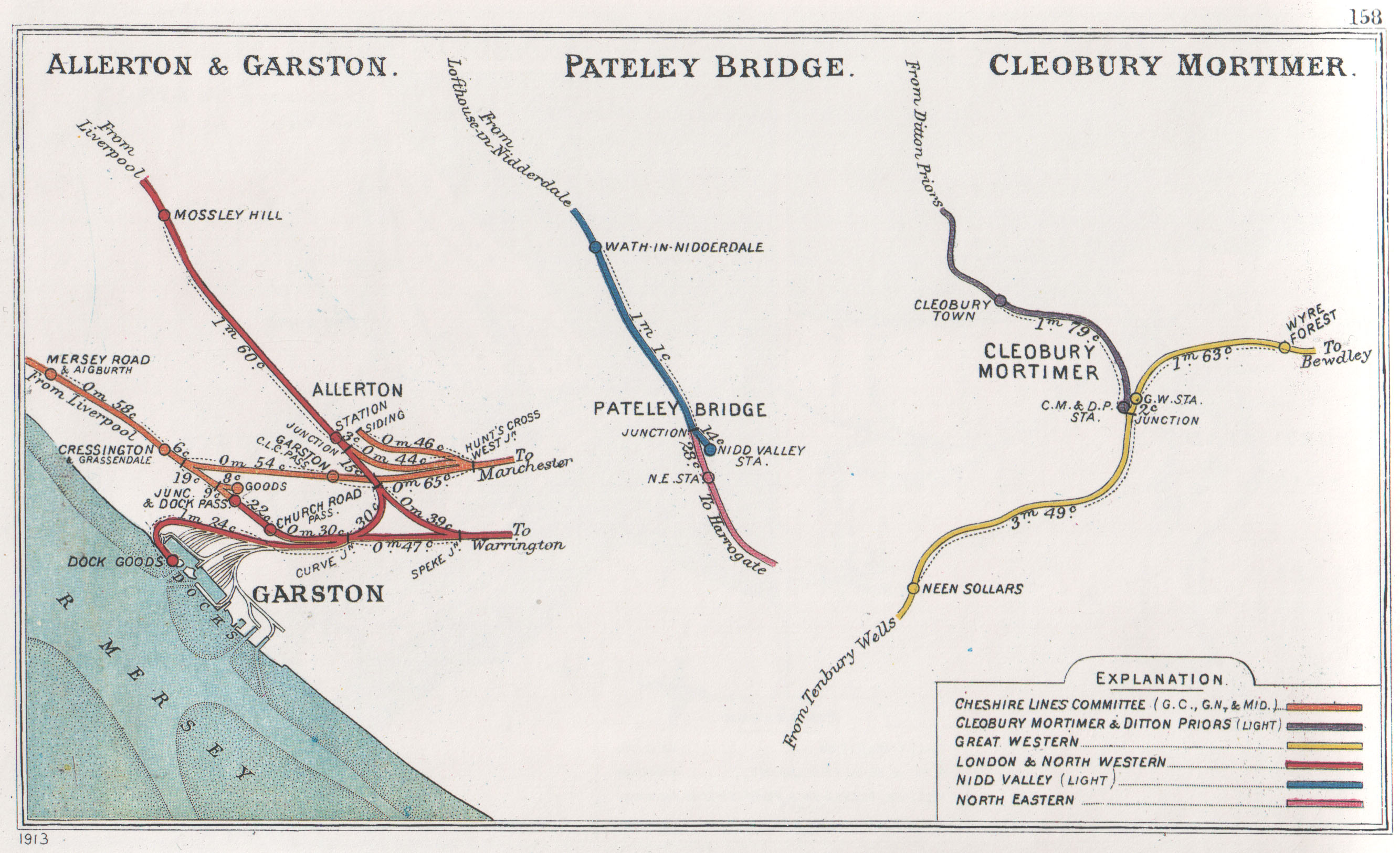
A 1913 Railway Clearing House map showing (left) railways in the vicinity of Garston

The station was opened on 1 April 1874 by the Cheshire Lines Committee. It was served by local services between Liverpool Central, Warrington Central and Manchester Central, and also to Aintree Central on the North Liverpool Extension Line.

In 1960, the passenger service to Aintree was cut back to Gateacre. In 1966 services from Manchester were diverted to Liverpool Lime Street, leaving Garston with just the Gateacre-Liverpool train. This service continued until 17 April 1972, when Garston station closed along with the line from Liverpool Central.

In 1978, the former CLC route through Garston was partially reinstated as part of the electrified Northern Line of Merseyrail, and the station reopened on 2 January 1978 as a single platform terminus for services from Kirkby. Prior to the 1972 closure, the station had been named simply Garston, but upon reopening in 1978, it became Garston (Lancs), which was changed the following year to Garston (Merseyside). In 1983 services were extended further south to Hunts Cross and Garston once again became a through station with two platforms. In 1984 services were diverted to run to Southport instead of Kirkby. From the airport's opening in 1933 until 1986 it was the nearest station to Liverpool Airport.

In 2004, work began on a combined rail/bus interchange at Liverpool South Parkway. The new station's proximity to Garston rendered the old station surplus to requirements. Garston closed on 10 June 2006 and Liverpool South Parkway opened the following day.

The station was demolished soon after closure, but the access road with its original road markings still exist.

== Services ==
At the time of closure, trains operated to Southport via Liverpool Central to the north, and Hunts Cross to the south at 15-minute intervals, Monday-Saturday daytimes. During evenings and all day Sundays, the frequency was every 30 minutes.

| Preceding station | Historical railways | Following station |
|---|---|---|
| Cressington; Line and station open | Merseyrail; Northern Line | Hunts Cross; Line and station open |

== See also ==
- Allerton TMD
- Allerton Junction
- Garston Dock railway station
- Hunts Cross chord
