= Brunswick railway station =

Railway station in Merseyside, England

Brunswick
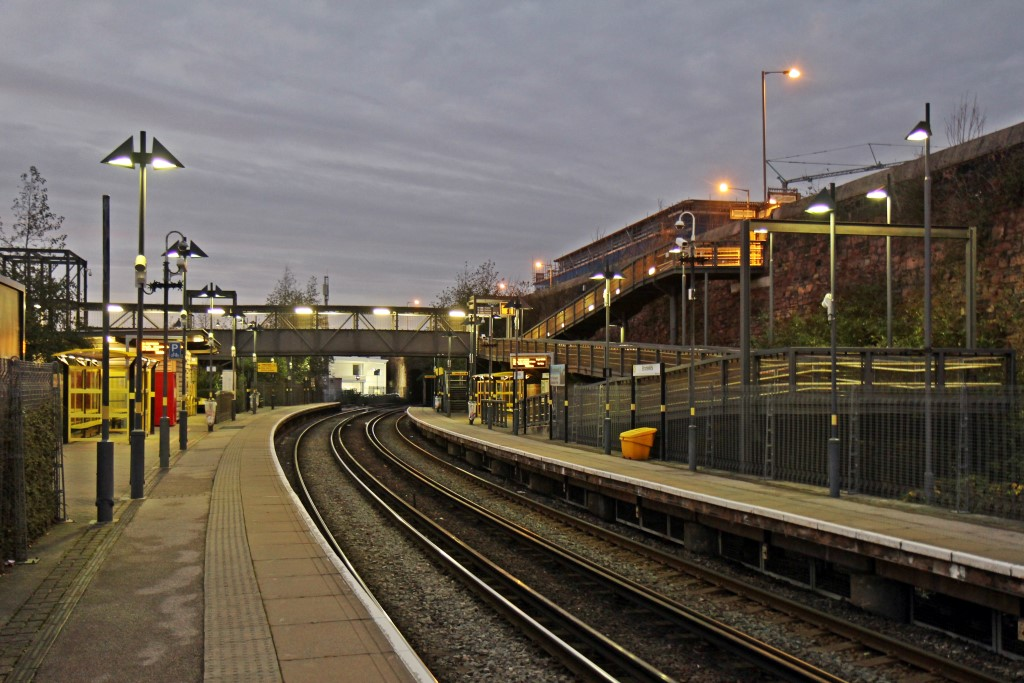
- A broad view of the platforms.

General information
- Location: Toxteth, City of Liverpool, England
- Coordinates: 53.3833°N 2.9762°W
- Grid reference: SJ351878
- Manager: Merseyrail
- Transit authority: Merseytravel
- Platforms: 2

Other information
- Station code: BRW
- Fare zone: C1
- Classification: DfT category E

History
- Original company: Garston and Liverpool Railway

Key dates
- 1 June 1864: First station opened
- 1 March 1874: Station closed
- 26 March 1998: Second station opened on different site

Passengers
- 2021/22: ▲0.697 million
- 2022/23: ▲0.783 million
- 2023/24: ▲0.874 million
- 2024/25: ▼0.847 million
- 2025/26: ▲0.902 million
Location
Notes
- Passenger statistics from the Office of Rail and Road

Brunswick railway station serves Toxteth and the nearby district of Dingle in Liverpool, Merseyside, England. It lies on the Northern Line of the Merseyrail network, situated on a short section of track between two tunnels, and between the now in-filled Toxteth and Harrington Docks. The station also serves businesses on the Brunswick Dock estate, which gives its name to the station. The residential area of Grafton Street is reached by steps or ramp from the southbound platform.

== History ==
The original Brunswick station was opened on 1 June 1864 by the Garston and Liverpool Railway, on Sefton Street, Liverpool's southern section of the Dock Road. It was the Liverpool terminus of a new Garston and Liverpool Railway line to Liverpool. The terminus was inconveniently outside of the city centre and, after only ten years, it closed on 1 March 1874 when the line was diverted and extended, mainly by tunnel, to Liverpool Central High Level.

A large impressive goods terminal building remained on the station site, providing a connection to the Mersey Docks Railway, giving trains direct access to the quayside at the docks. The goods terminal building was closed in the 1970s. The mouth of the former Liverpool Overhead Railway tunnel which led to Dingle can be seen just south of the station.

The present passenger station opened on 26 March 1998, on a site close to the original station but on the through route to Merseyrail's Liverpool Central underground station. The industrial former dock buildings are served on the river side, and a small housing estate at a higher point on the other.

== Facilities ==
The station has a free 35-space car park. The Liverpool-bound platform has a ticket office and a shelter with seats. A bridge leads over to the Hunts Cross-bound platform which has another shelter. A ramp and stairs lead upwards to the eastern entrance. There is a rack for eight bicycles and secure storage for ten.

== Services ==
The typical Monday to Saturday service at the station is four trains per hour northbound to Ormskirk, via Liverpool Central, and four trains per hour southbound to Hunts Cross. On Sundays there are two trains per hour in each direction.

Preceding station	National Rail	Following station
Liverpool Central towards Ormskirk	Merseyrail; Northern Line	St Michaels towards Hunts Cross
	Historical railways	
Terminus	Cheshire Lines Committee; Garston and Liverpool Railway	St Michaels; Line and station open
