= Hunts Cross railway station =

Railway station in Liverpool, England

Hunts Cross
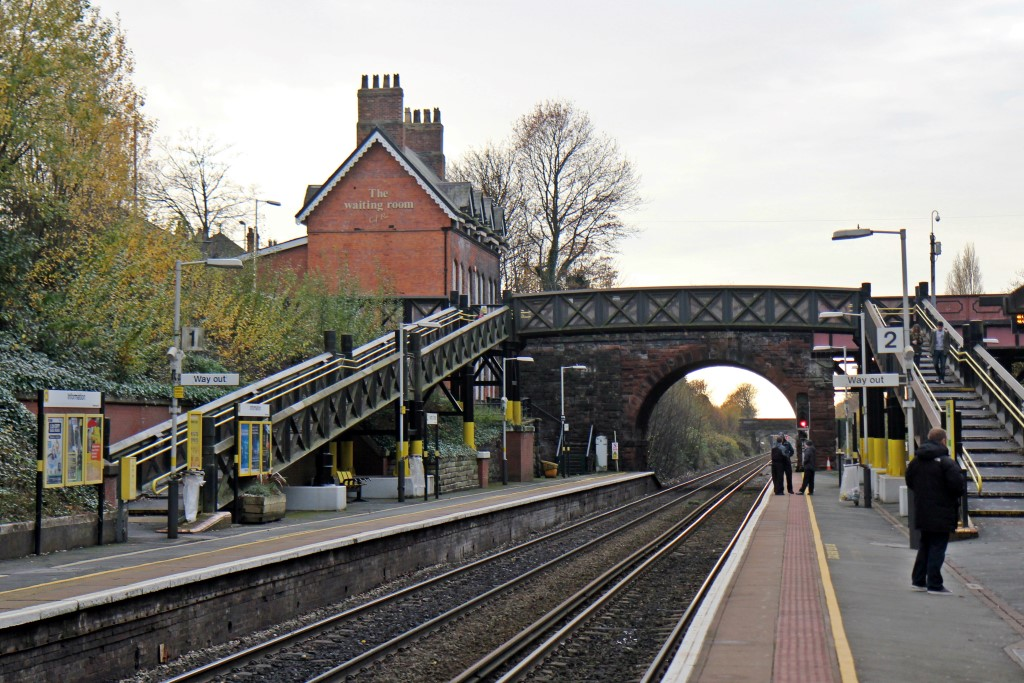
- The station buildings at Hunts Cross.

General information
- Location: Hunt's Cross, Liverpool; England
- Coordinates: 53.3606°N 2.8560°W
- Grid reference: SJ431852
- Manager: Merseyrail
- Transit authority: Merseytravel
- Platforms: 3

Other information
- Station code: HNX
- Fare zone: C2
- Classification: DfT category E

History
- Original company: Cheshire Lines Committee
- Pre-grouping: Cheshire Lines Committee
- Post-grouping: Cheshire Lines Committee

Key dates
- May 1874: Opened
- 1983: Electrified

Passengers
- 2021/22: ▲1.156 million
- Interchange: ▲37,818
- 2022/23: ▲1.308 million
- Interchange: ▼10,359
- 2023/24: ▲1.424 million
- Interchange: ▲17,914
- 2024/25: ▼1.400 million
- Interchange: ▼5,915
- 2025/26: ▲1.535 million
- Interchange: ▲8,297
Location
Notes
- Passenger statistics from the Office of Rail and Road

Hunts Cross railway station is a Grade II listed railway station in Hunt's Cross, Liverpool, England. It is situated on the southern branch of the City Line (Merseytravel)'s Liverpool to Manchester Line route, and is the southern terminus of Merseyrail's Northern Line.

== History ==
Originally built by the Cheshire Lines Committee and opened in May 1874, Hunts Cross was the only four-platform station on the line running between Liverpool Central and Manchester Central stations. It was also a junction at the southern end of the North Liverpool Extension Line to Gateacre, West Derby, north Liverpool docks and Southport. This line was closed in stages from 1952 to 1979 and is now part of National Cycle Network Route 62, the Trans Pennine Trail. The closure of the North Liverpool route left Hunts Cross to be served by the local service from Liverpool Lime Street to Warrington and Manchester.

In 1983, Merseyrail's electrified Northern Line from Liverpool Central was extended to Hunts Cross from its previous terminus at Garston. One of the former Gateacre line platforms was reinstated as a bay platform for terminating electric services. Northern Line trains originally ran through to Kirkby, but in 1984 the timetable was altered and trains continued to Southport instead. The station underwent a £900,000 facelift in 1995, with the improved facilities reopening on 10 May.

When the Merseyrail service was introduced, the service from Liverpool Lime Street to Manchester was cut back to terminate at Hunts Cross. Passengers from Manchester wishing to continue to Liverpool had to change to a Merseyrail train. This arrangement was short-lived and ended in 1989 when the through trains to Lime Street were restored.

From 11 June 2006, the number of Manchester-bound trains stopping at Hunts Cross was reduced from two trains per hour to one. However, during morning and evening peaks the half-hourly frequency is still maintained.

From 11 December 2006, the Monday-Saturday evening Northern Line service was increased to run every 15 minutes. Previously, services had reduced to a half-hourly frequency after 7.30pm.

In the May 2013 'Network News' section of the Northern Line timetable, it was announced that Hunts Cross would shortly receive funding in order to develop improvement schemes at the station.

== Facilities ==
The station is in a cutting and is fully accessible by the addition of lifts to the platforms, opened in 2022. A building on the Southport/Manchester-bound (island) platform (platforms 2&3) contains an accessible toilet and a waiting room. The former main station building has been converted into a bar/restaurant and has been replaced by a modern ticket office (which is staffed throughout the day until end of service, seven days a week). A small car park is available, and bus stops are nearby. Train running information is offered via digital display screens and automated announcements.

== Services ==
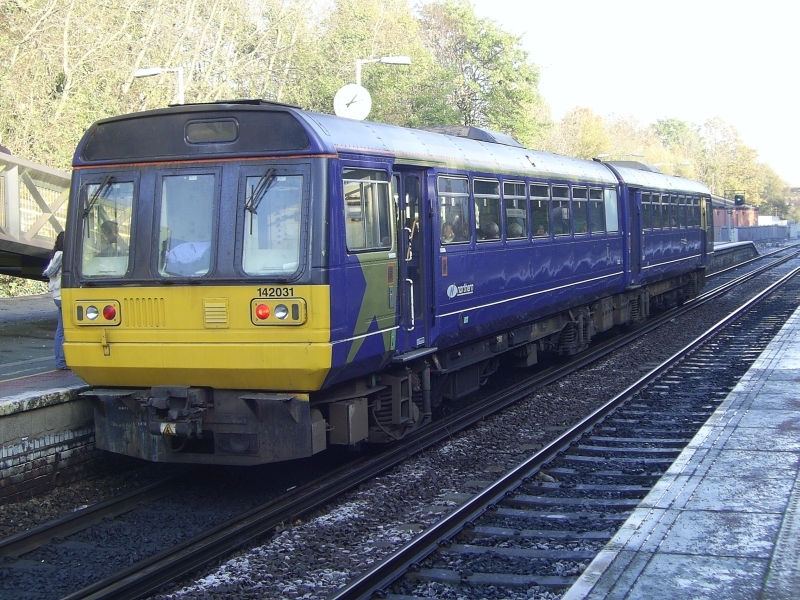
Northern Rail unit 142031 in Platform 2 on a Manchester Oxford Road service.

Hunts Cross is served by diesel Northern Trains services on the City Line between Liverpool Lime Street and Warrington Central. This service has one train per hour with additional calls during peak hours. Merseyrail electric Northern Line services operate from Southport via Liverpool Central every 15 minutes Monday to Saturday, reducing to half-hourly on Sundays.

In addition, a limited number of peak-hour services operated by East Midlands Railway stop here between Liverpool, Manchester and Nottingham/Norwich.

Hunts Cross station currently has three operational platforms.

1. Northern Trains and East Midlands Railway services bound for Liverpool Lime Street (Liverpool to Manchester Line).
2. Northern Trains services bound for Warrington Central and Manchester Oxford Road (Liverpool to Manchester Line).
3. Merseyrail services bound for Liverpool Central and Ormskirk (Merseyrail Northern Line).

Preceding station	National Rail	Following station
Liverpool South Parkway towards Ormskirk	Merseyrail; Northern Line	Terminus
Liverpool South Parkway	Northern Trains; Southern Route (Cheshire Lines)	Halewood
Liverpool South Parkway	East Midlands Railway; Liverpool–Norwich	Widnes
	Historical railways	
Garston; Line open, station closed	Merseyrail; Northern Line	Terminus
	Disused railways	
Garston; Line open, station closed	Cheshire Lines Committee; North Liverpool Extension Line	Gateacre; Line and station closed

The track serving platform 2 is also electrified and can be used by Merseyrail EMUs if the usual platform is blocked. This facility is used rarely, as any terminating train in this platform will block the through line towards Manchester, with potential delays to other services.

== Gallery ==
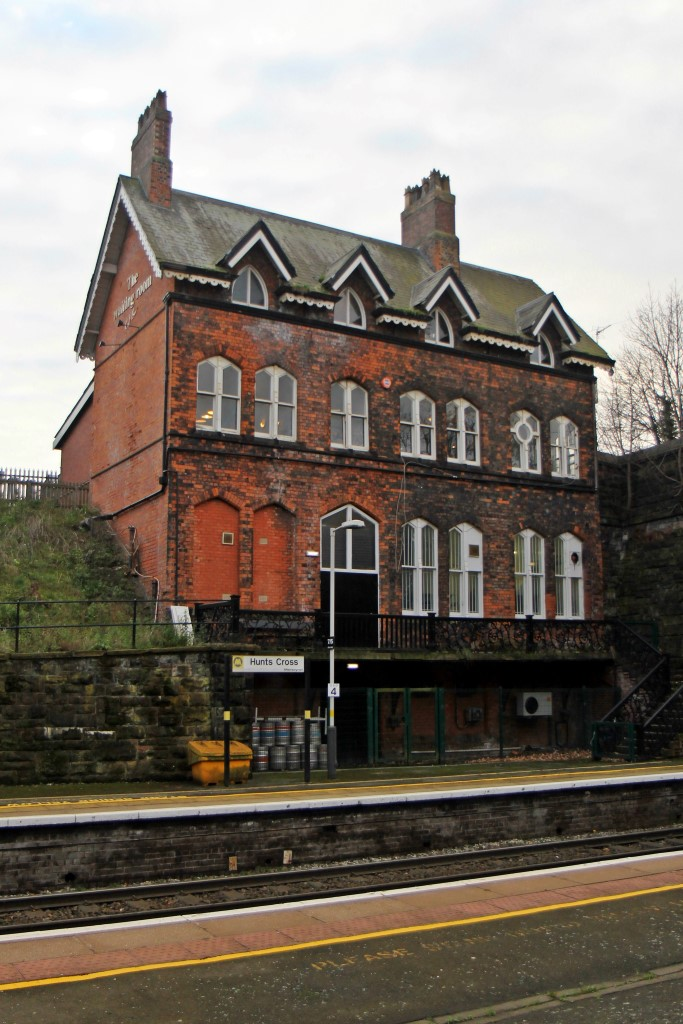
The Waiting Room bar and restaurant, formerly the station building.

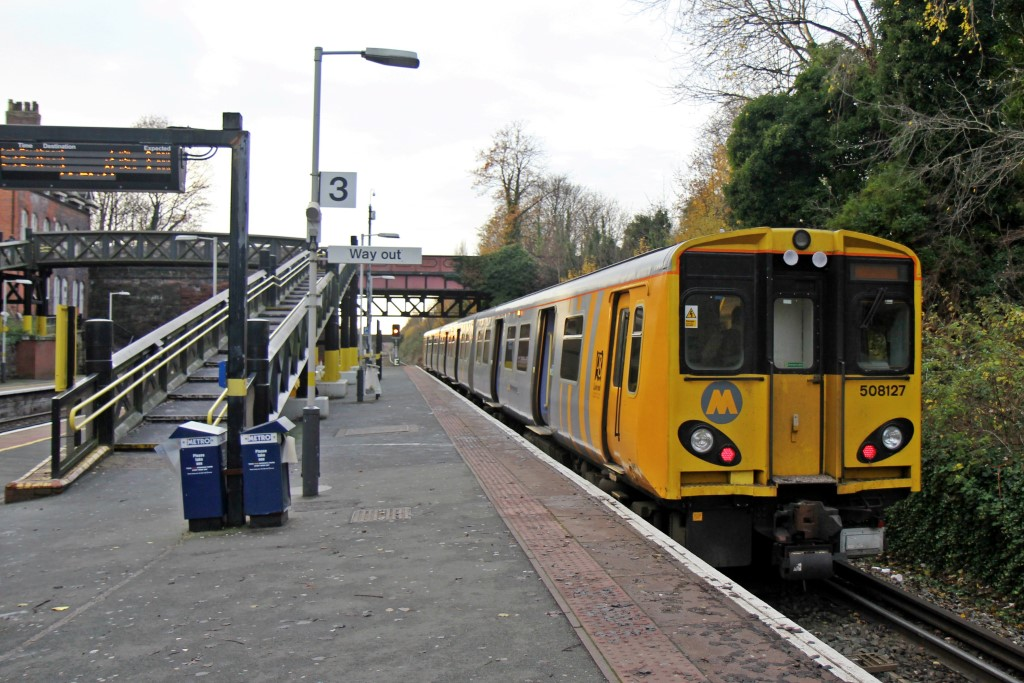
A Merseyrail Class 508 arrives with a service from Liverpool.

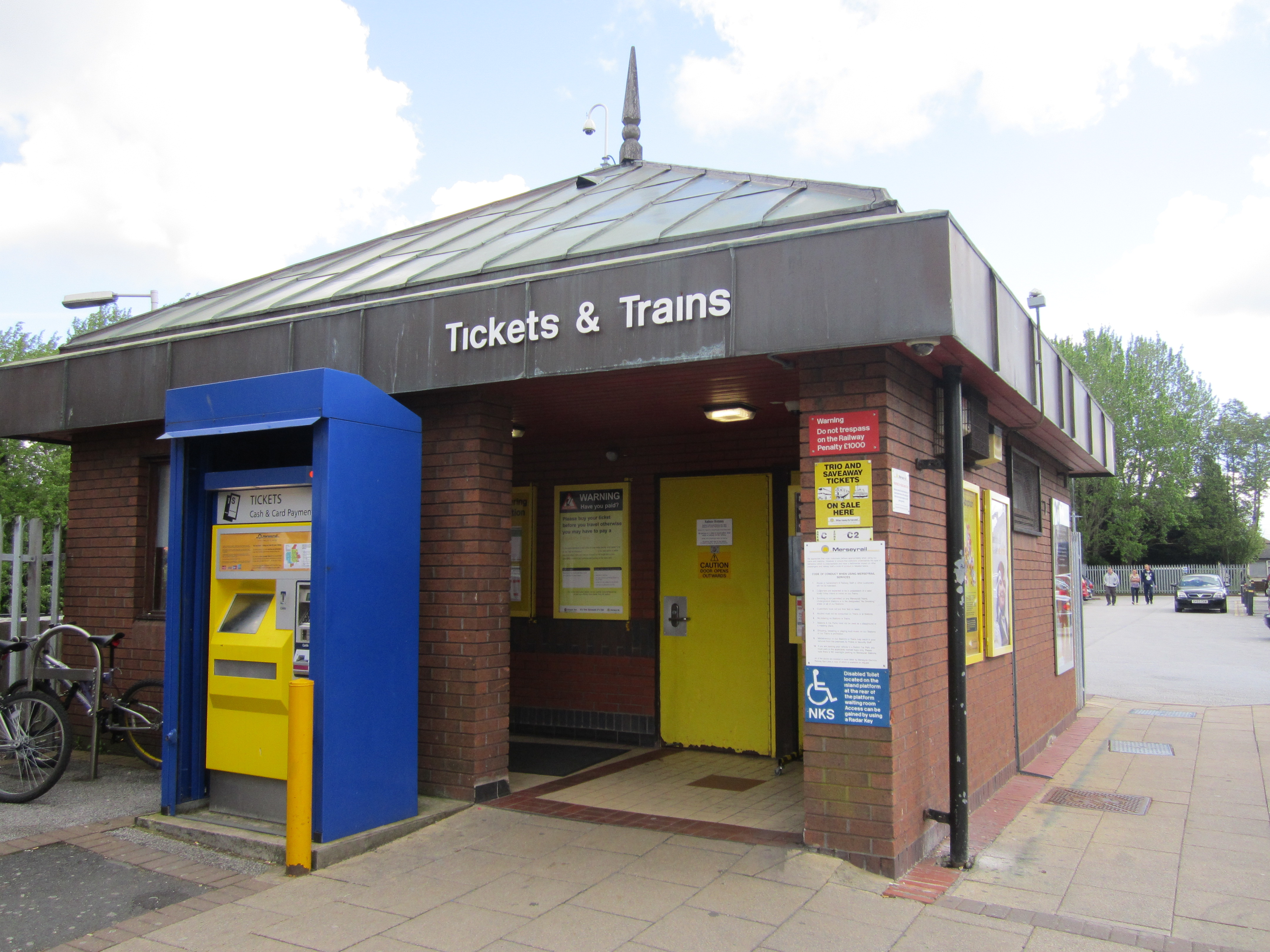
The modern station building.

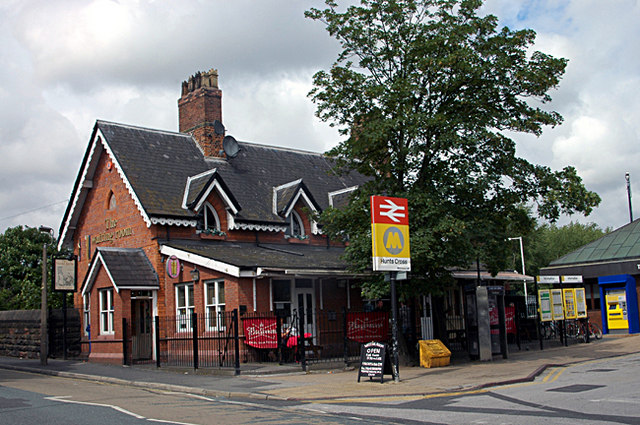
A view of the station, from the street.
