= List of railway stations in Merseyside =

Railway stations in English county

Merseyrail lines shown in Merseyside
Northern line
Wirral line
MT City Lines
Primary route
Secondary route
Rural route
Goods line
Disused line

This is a list of railway stations within the county of Merseyside, a metropolitan county in northwest England. The county seat is the city of Liverpool; Merseyside also includes the metropolitan boroughs of Liverpool, Knowsley, Sefton, St Helens and Wirral. It includes all railway stations in Merseyside that currently have regular timetabled train services.

Merseyrail is the name of the commuter rail network and train operating company which provides the majority of local rail services on Merseyside. The Merseyside Passenger Transport Executive, branded Merseytravel, coordinates public transport in Merseyside. In respect of rail services, it is responsible for awarding the Merseyrail franchise to private operators, and for setting zonal boundaries for season ticket fares. Other regional rail services in the metropolitan county are run by operators such as Northern; Merseytravel also sponsors these services, and the Merseyrail branding is used at the stations which they serve.

== Stations currently in use ==
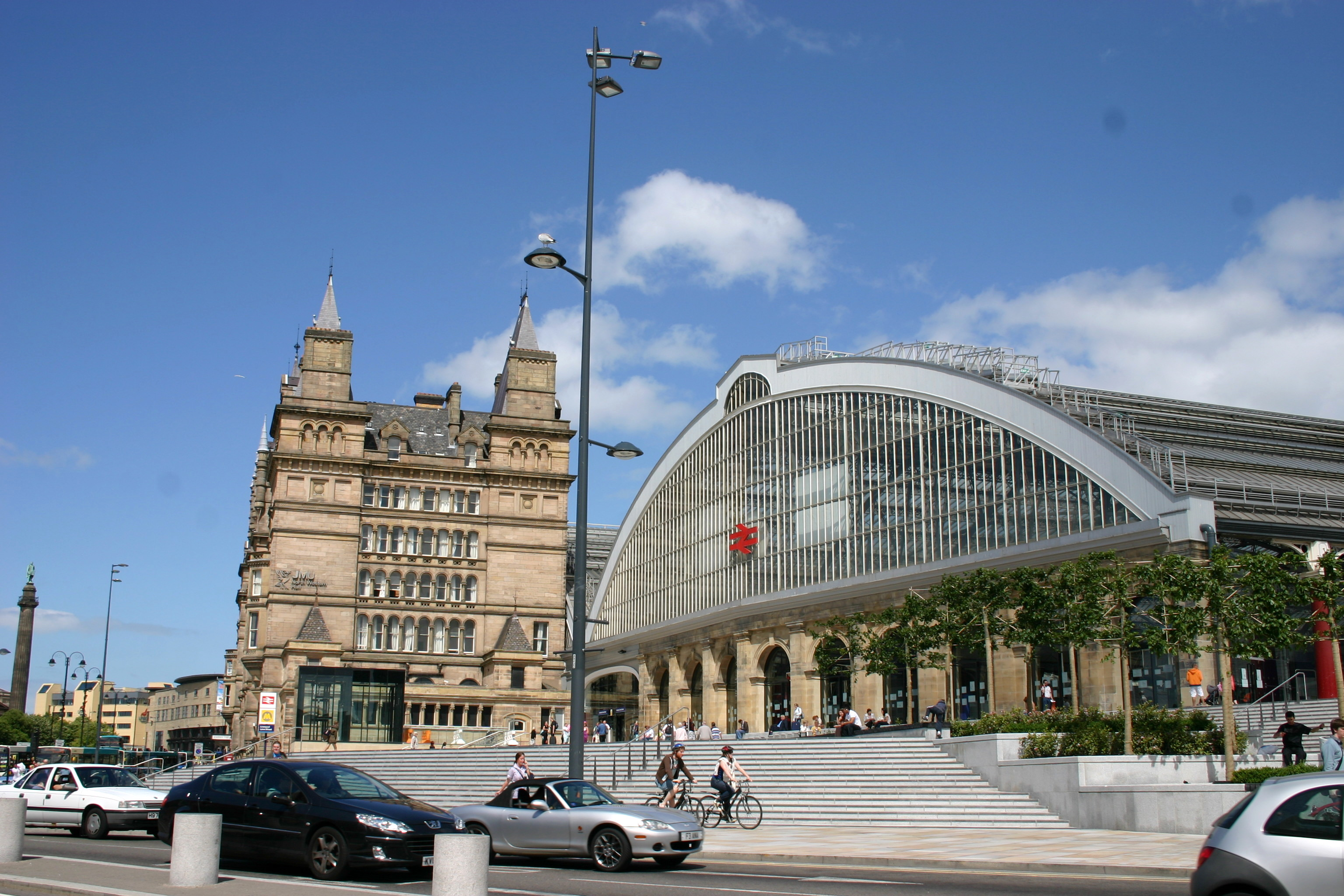
Liverpool Lime Street

Hamilton Square

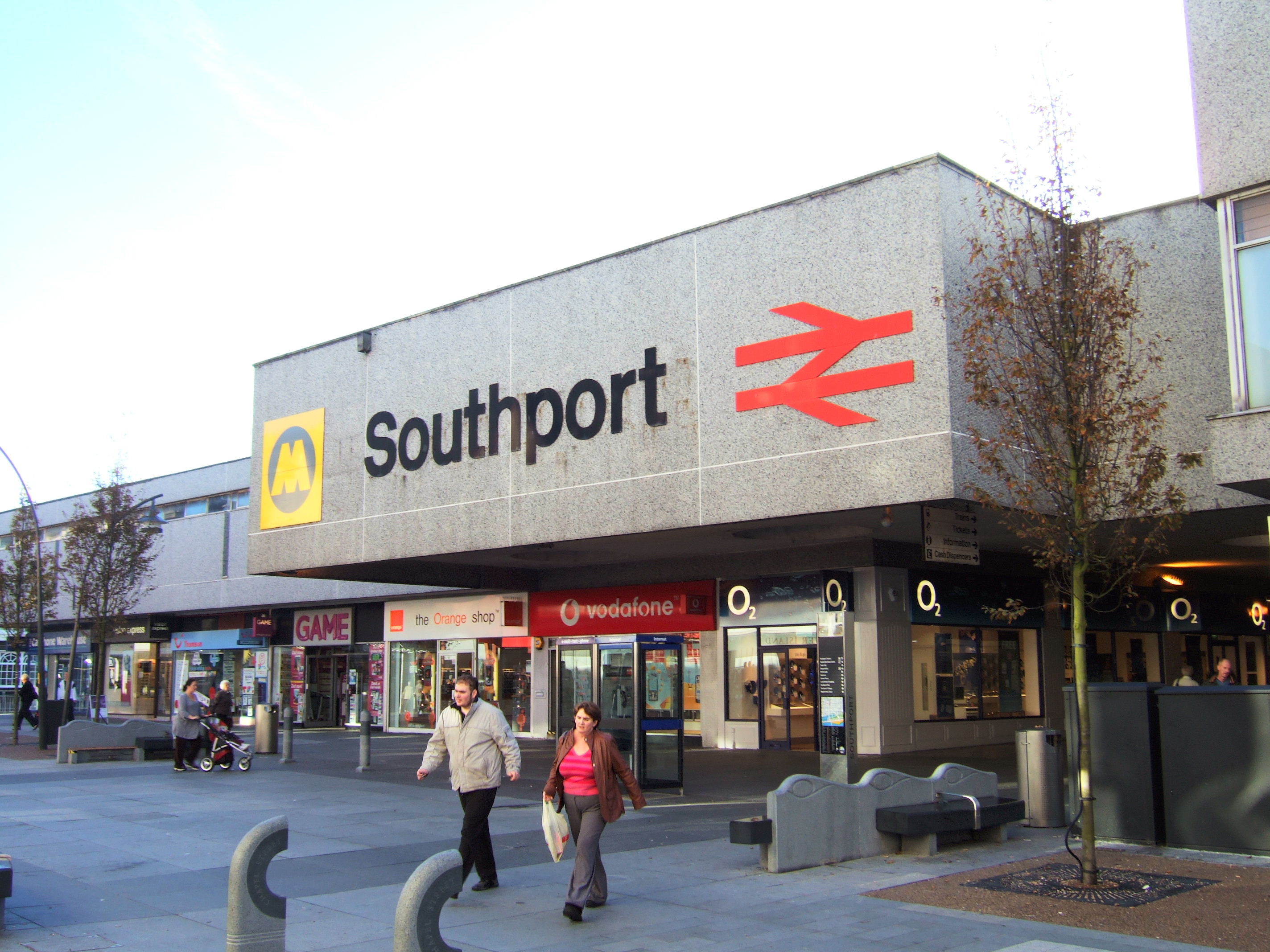
Southport

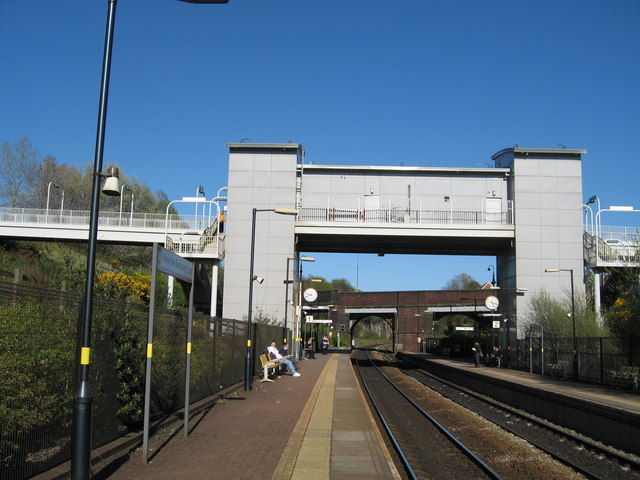
Wavertree Technology Park

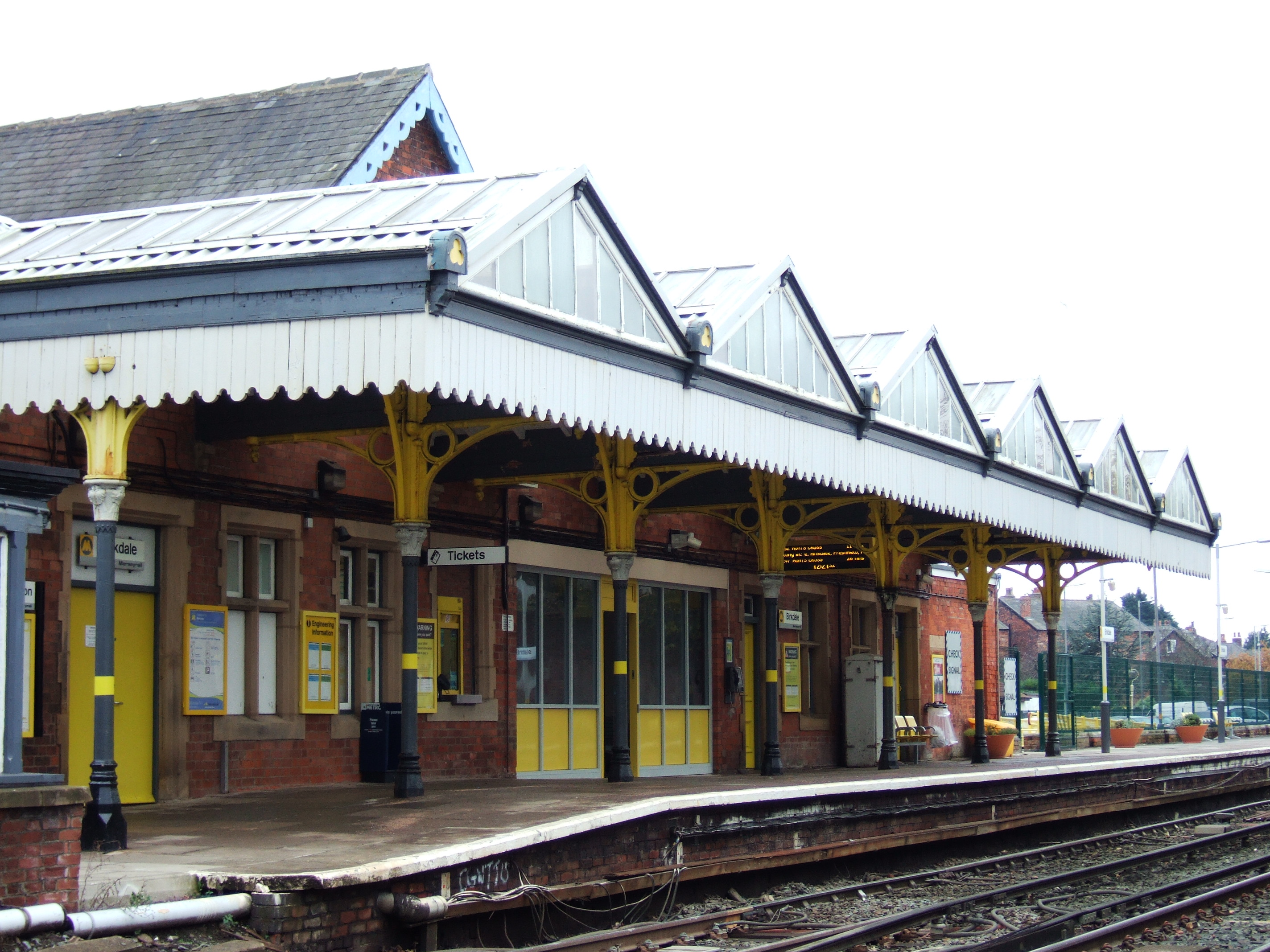
Birkdale

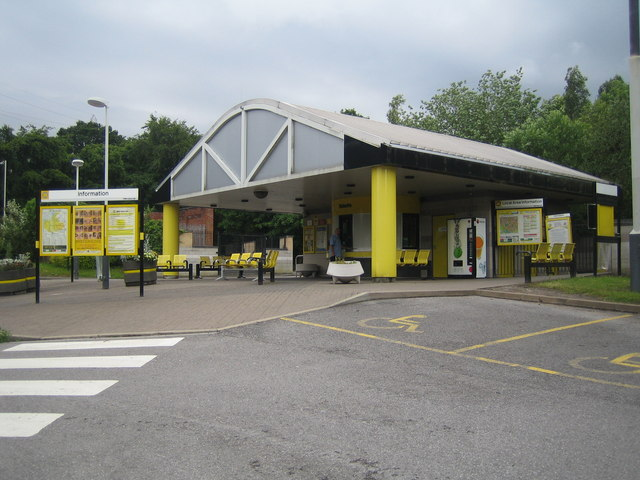
Eastham Rake

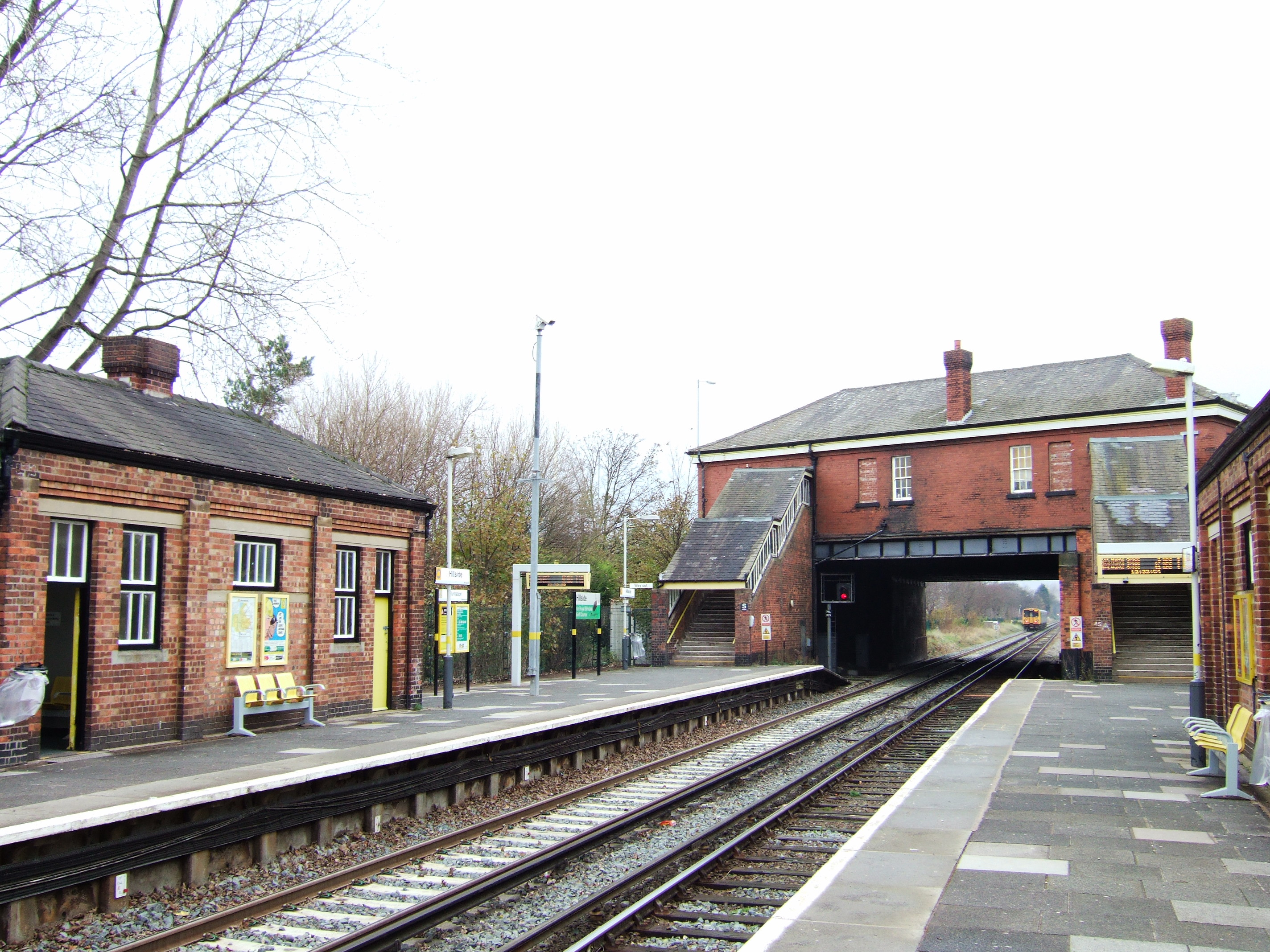
Hillside

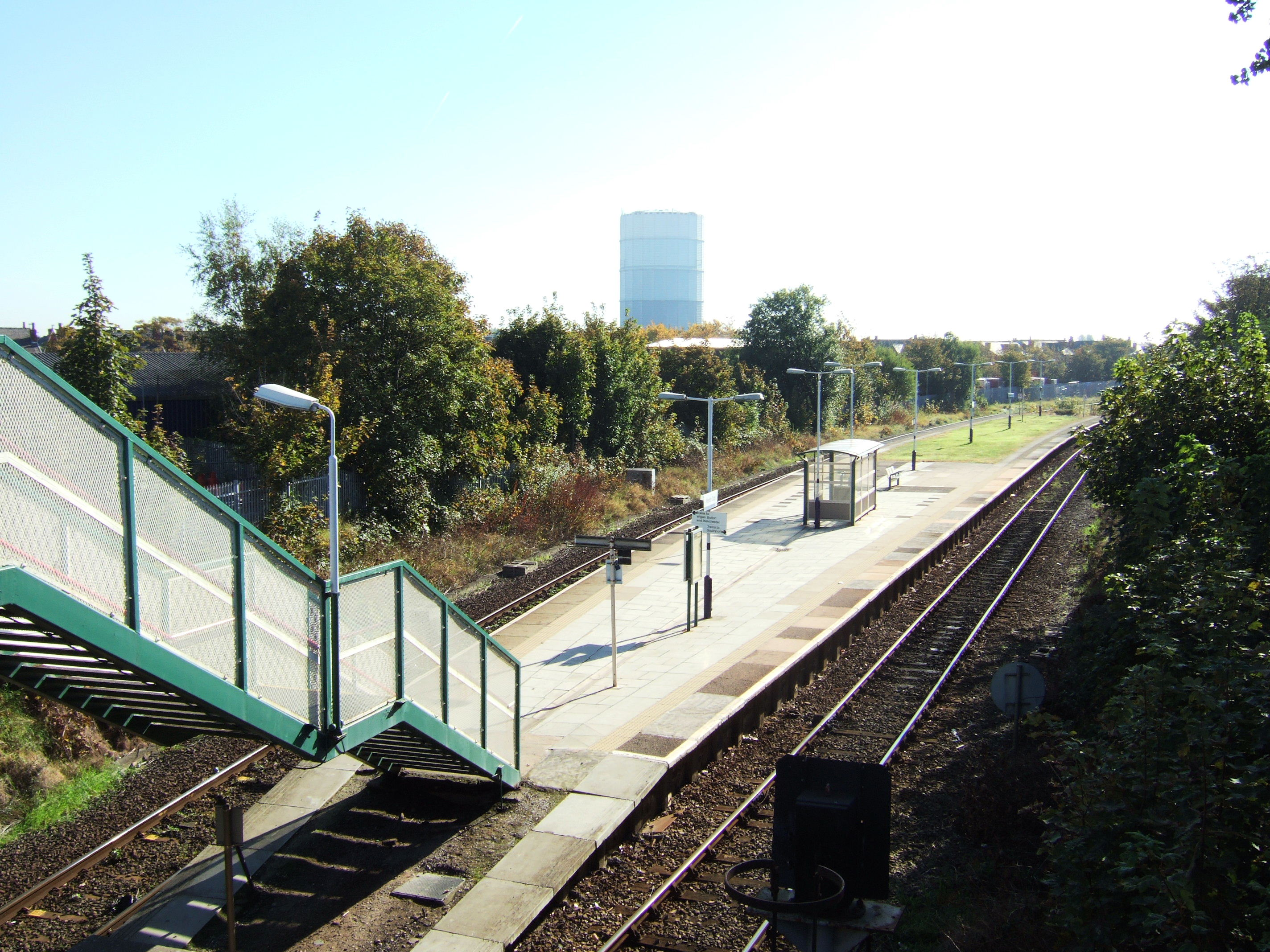
Meols Cop

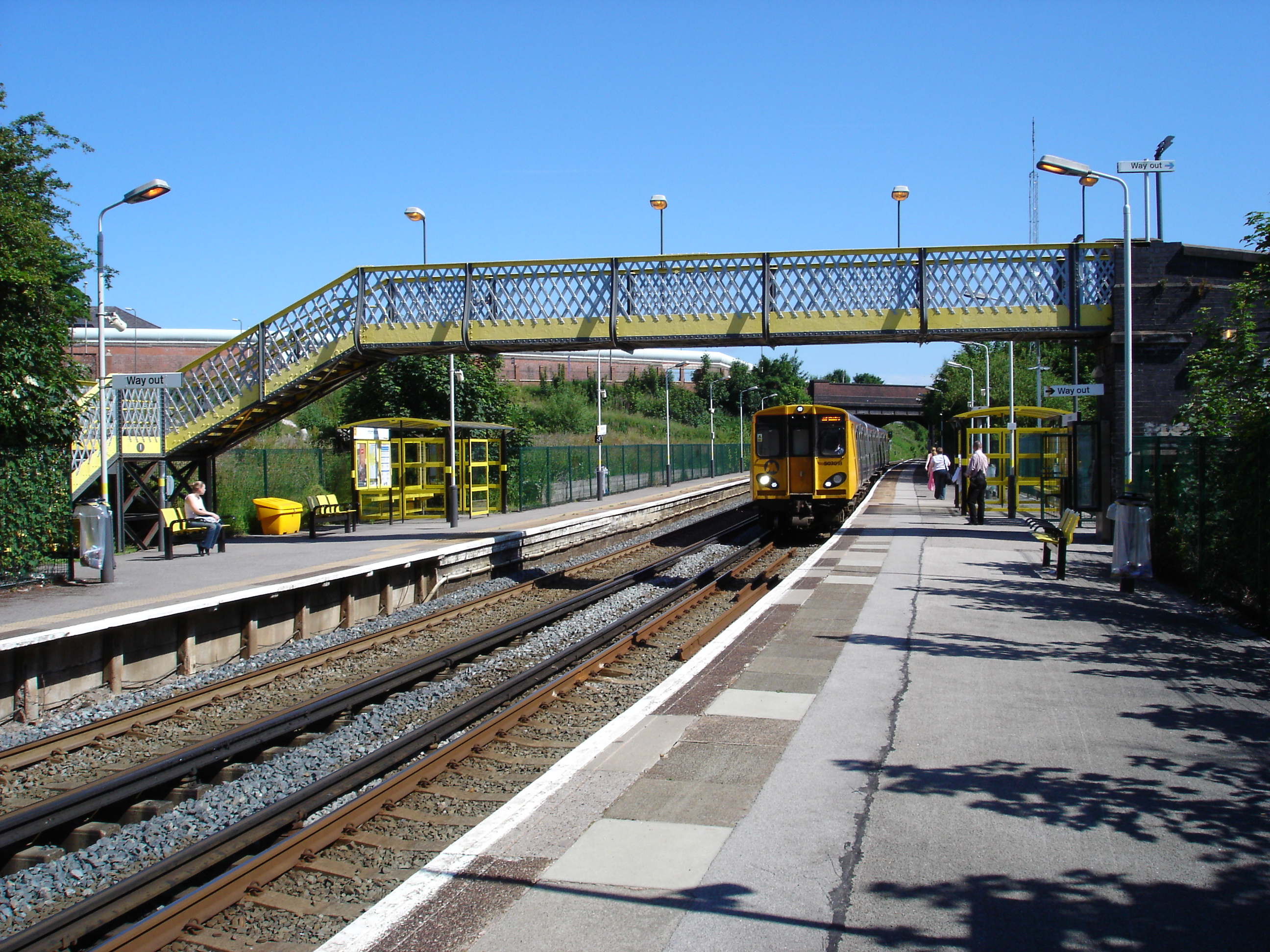
Walton

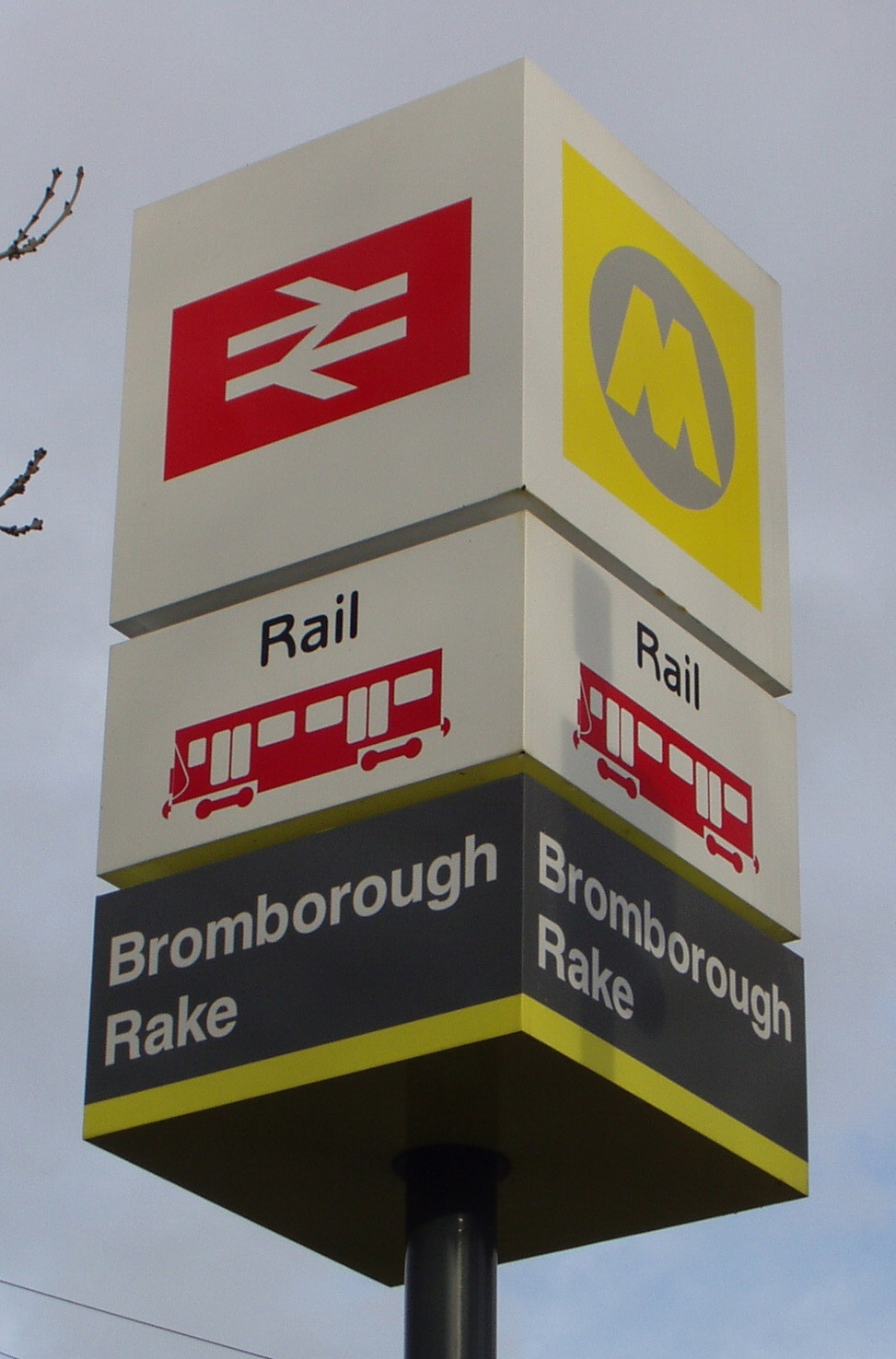
National Rail- and Merseyrail-branded sign at Bromborough Rake

The following table lists the name and three-letter code of each station, the year it first opened, the metropolitan borough in which it lies, the zone(s) in which it is situated, the train operators who currently provide its services and the number of passengers using the station in the 2014–15 and 2015–16 financial years as collated by the Office of Rail Regulation a Government body.

Station and code	Year opened	Metropolitan borough	Zones	Served by	Station users 2014–15	Station users 2015–16
Aigburth (AIG)	1864^{[a]}	Liverpool	C1	Merseyrail	746,784	833,452
Ainsdale (ANS)	1848	Sefton	D1	Merseyrail	1,084,348	1,004,554
Aintree (AIN)	1849	Sefton	C1/C3	Merseyrail	1,084,348	1,059,602
Bank Hall (BAH)	1850	Liverpool	C1	Merseyrail	159,438	159,438
Bebington (BEB)	1838	Wirral	B1	Merseyrail	919,782	924,850
Bidston (BID)	1866	Wirral	B1	Merseyrail; Transport for Wales	321,194	319,994
Birkdale (BDL)	1848	Sefton	D1	Merseyrail	954,774	999,758
Birkenhead Central (BKC)	1886	Wirral	B1	Merseyrail	1,062,924	965,262
Birkenhead Hamilton Square (BKQ)	1886	Wirral	B1	Merseyrail	1,723,020	2,017,478
Birkenhead North (BKN)	1888	Wirral	B1	Merseyrail	744,004	771,214
Birkenhead Park (BKP)	1888	Wirral	B1	Merseyrail	785,566	771,118
Blundellsands & Crosby (BLN)	1850	Sefton	C3	Merseyrail	1,369,650	1,411,140
Bootle New Strand (BNW)	1850	Sefton	C3	Merseyrail	974,574	976,556
Bootle Oriel Road (BOT)	1850	Sefton	C1/C3	Merseyrail	617,332	642,868
Broad Green (BGE)	1830	Liverpool	C1	Northern	575,614	622,400
Bromborough (BOM)	1841	Wirral	B2	Merseyrail	624,938	645,174
Bromborough Rake (BMR)	1985	Wirral	B2	Merseyrail	306,796	306,796
Brunswick (BRW)	1998	Liverpool	C1	Merseyrail	871,856	929,958
Conway Park (CNP)	1998	Wirral	B1	Merseyrail	1,284,510	1,061,164
Cressington (CSG)	1864^{[a]}	Liverpool	C1	Merseyrail	477,112	476,636
Earlestown (ERL)	1830	St Helens	A1	Northern; Transport for Wales	499,118	539,502
Eastham Rake (ERA)	1995	Wirral	B2	Merseyrail	335,508	328,052
Eccleston Park (ECL)	1873	St Helens	A2	Northern	109,834	119,604
Edge Hill (EDG)	1836	Liverpool	C1	Northern	157,568	170,904
Fazakerley (FAZ)	1848	Liverpool	C1	Merseyrail	1,088,202	1,088,808
Formby (FBY)	1848	Sefton	D2	Merseyrail	1,311,918	1,385,228
Freshfield (FRE)	1848	Sefton	D2	Merseyrail	771,648	777,812
Garswood (GSW)	1869	St Helens	A1	Northern	278,362	305,950
Green Lane (GNL)	1886	Wirral	B1	Merseyrail	444,874	405,216
Halewood (HED)	1988	Knowsley	C2	Northern	113,306	117,560
Hall Road (HLR)	1874	Sefton	C3	Merseyrail	259,738	259,346
Headbolt Lane (HBL)	2023	Knowsley	A3/C2/C3	Northern; Merseyrail	N/A	N/A
Heswall (HSW)	1898	Wirral	B2	Transport for Wales	55,860	56,660
Hightown (HTO)	1848	Sefton	D2	Merseyrail	316,878	314,282
Hillside (HIL)	1926	Sefton	D1	Merseyrail	542,006	521,616
Hoylake (HYK)	1866	Wirral	B2	Merseyrail	630,432	504,528
Hunts Cross (HNX)	1873	Liverpool	C2	East Midlands Railway; Merseyrail; Northern	1,364,502	1,410,366
Huyton (HUY)	1830	Knowsley	A3/C1/ C2/C3	Northern	952,688	1,002,732
Kirkby (KIR)	1848	Knowsley	A3/C2/C3	Merseyrail	2,408,810	2,356,170
Kirkdale (KKD)	1848	Liverpool	C1	Merseyrail	866,218	869,870
Lea Green (LEG)	2000	St Helens	A1	Northern; TransPennine Express	393,556	439,500
Leasowe (LSW)	1894	Wirral	B1	Merseyrail	612,230	607,590
Liverpool Central (LVC)	1892^{[b]}	Liverpool	C1	Merseyrail	15,272,837	15,638,894
Liverpool James Street (LVJ)	1886	Liverpool	C1	Merseyrail	3,215,334	3,292,399
Liverpool Lime Street (LIV)	1836^{[c]}	Liverpool	C1	Avanti West Coast; East Midlands Railway; London Northwestern Railway; Merseyrail; Northern; TransPennine Express; Transport for Wales	14,870,920	15,227,344
Liverpool South Parkway (LPY)	2006	Liverpool	C1/C2	East Midlands Railway; London Northwestern Railway; Merseyrail; Northern; TransPennine Express; Transport for Wales	1,803,308	1,893,958
Maghull (MAG)	1849	Sefton	C3	Merseyrail	1,821,492	1,812,534
Maghull North (MNS)	2018	Sefton	C3/F	Merseyrail		
Manor Road (MNR)	1938	Wirral	B2	Merseyrail	271,442	268,532
Meols (MEO)	1866	Wirral	B2	Merseyrail	407,816	415,338
Meols Cop (MEC)	1887	Sefton	D1	Northern	70,476	77,410
Moorfields (MRF)	1977	Liverpool	C1	Merseyrail	6,832,585	6,996,347
Moreton (MRT)	1866	Wirral	B1	Merseyrail	552,346	535,134
Mossley Hill (MSH)	1939	Liverpool	C1	Northern	254,434	262,990
New Brighton (NBN)	1888	Wirral	B1	Merseyrail	934,144	958,432
Newton-le-Willows (NLW)	1830	St Helens	A1	Northern; Transport for Wales; TransPennine Express	747,416	775,864
Old Roan (ORN)	1935	Sefton	C3	Merseyrail	896,562	903,968
Orrell Park (OPK)	1906	Liverpool	C1	Merseyrail	1,040,358	1,032,522
Port Sunlight (PSL)	1838	Wirral	B1	Merseyrail	678,046	700,924
Prescot (PSC)	1871	Knowsley	A3/C2/C3	Northern	363,932	391,294
Rainford (RNF)	1858	St Helens	A2	Northern	49,570	47,464
Rainhill (RNH)	1830	St Helens	A2	Northern	348,864	380,774
Rice Lane (RIL)	1848	Liverpool	C1	Merseyrail	314,362	315,126
Roby (ROB)	1830	Knowsley	C1	Northern	260,570	283,018
Rock Ferry (RFY)	1891	Wirral	B1	Merseyrail	713,364	711,696
Sandhills (SDL)	1850	Liverpool	C1	Merseyrail	1,324,068	1,321,020
Seaforth & Litherland (SFL)	1850	Sefton	C3	Merseyrail	750,192	759,314
Southport (SOP)	1851	Sefton	D1	Merseyrail; Northern	4,129,340	4,147,064
Spital (SPI)	1840	Wirral	B1/B2	Merseyrail	470,258	469,750
St Helens Central (SNH)	1858	St Helens	A1/A2	Northern; TransPennine Express	1,043,808	1,140,198
St Helens Junction (SHJ)	1833	St Helens	A1	Northern	359,030	385,966
St Michaels (STM)	1864^{[a]}	Liverpool	C1	Merseyrail	936,740	977,510
Thatto Heath (THH)	1871	St Helens	A1/A2	Northern	213,968	229,152
Upton (UPT)	1896	Wirral	B1	Transport for Wales	31,460	31,658
Wallasey Grove Road (WLG)	1888	Wirral	B1	Merseyrail	540,574	544,920
Wallasey Village (WLV)	1907	Wirral	B1	Merseyrail	512,908	508,096
Walton (WAO)	1849	Liverpool	C1	Merseyrail	272,784	271,828
Waterloo (WLO)	1848	Sefton	C3	Merseyrail	1,510,596	1,536,244
Wavertree Technology Park (WAV)	1998	Liverpool	C1	Northern	457,942	515,428
West Allerton (WSA)	1839	Liverpool	C1	Northern	93,352	96,652
West Kirby (WKI)	1878	Wirral	B2	Merseyrail	1,145,048	1,150,966
Whiston (WHN)	1990	Knowsley	A3/C2/C3	Northern	361,346	370,380

== Zones ==
The rail network is divided into four lettered areas, which are subdivided into numbered zones:

Area name	Colour	Letter	Zones
Liverpool	Green	C	C1, C2, C3
Sefton	Red	D	D1, D2
St Helens	Brown	A	A1, A2, A3
Wirral	Blue	B	B1, B2

Fares for weekly and longer-period rail, bus and intermodal season tickets are set according to the number of zones and/or areas passed through. Day tickets are issued between individual stations, however.

The Merseyrail area extends into some adjacent boroughs which are not part of Merseyside; for fare-setting purposes, additional zones F (yellow) and G (orange) cover these. The following non-Merseyside stations are served by Merseyrail trains:

Station and code	Local authority	Zones
Aughton Park (AUG)	West Lancashire	F
Town Green (TWN)	West Lancashire	F
Ormskirk (OMS)	West Lancashire	F
Hooton (HOO)	Cheshire West and Chester	B2/G1
Little Sutton (LTT)	Cheshire West and Chester	G1
Overpool (OVE)	Cheshire West and Chester	G1
Ellesmere Port (ELP)	Cheshire West and Chester	G1
Capenhurst (CPU)	Cheshire West and Chester	G1/G2
Bache (BAC)	Cheshire West and Chester	G2
Chester (CTR)	Cheshire West and Chester	G2

Additionally, Maghull North station is in both Zone C3 and Zone F.

== Closed stations ==
Railways around Liverpool in 1921
London & North Western (LNWR)
Lancashire & Yorkshire (LYR)
Cheshire Lines (GCR / MR / GNR)
Midland (MR)
Great Central (GCR)
Wirral & Mersey
Liverpool Overhead
Joint GCR / MR
Joint LYR / LNWR
Joint GWR / LNWR
Lancashire
Cheshire
Flintshire

Station	Year opened	Year closed	Original company	Notes
Ainsdale Beach	1901	1952	Cheshire Lines Committee	Closed between 1917 and 1919
Aintree Central	1880	1960	Cheshire Lines Committee	Open for race traffic until 1963
Aintree Racecourse	c. 1890	1962	Lancashire and Yorkshire Railway	
Alexandra Dock	1881	1948	London and North Western Railway	
Alexandra Dock	1893	1956	Liverpool Overhead Railway	
Allerton	1864	2005	St Helens and Runcorn Gap Railway	Replaced by Liverpool South Parkway
Altcar Rifle Range	1862	1921	London and North Western Railway	Closed between 1893 and 1894
Birkdale Palace	1884	1952	Cheshire Lines Committee	Closed between 1917 and 1919
Birkenhead Monks Ferry	1844	1878	Chester and Birkenhead Railway	
Birkenhead Town	1889	1945	Chester and Birkenhead Railway	
Birkenhead Woodside	1878	1967	Birkenhead Joint Railway	
Blowick	1871	1939	Manchester and Southport Railway	
Bootle Balliol Road	1870	1948	London and North Western Railway	
Bootle Village	Before 1851	c.1876	Liverpool, Crosby and Southport Railway	
Breck Road	1870	1948	London and North Western Railway	
Brocklebank Dock		1956	Liverpool Overhead Railway	
Brunswick (original station)	1864	1874	Garston and Liverpool Railway	New station opened in 1998 on a different site
Brunswick Dock		1956	Liverpool Overhead Railway	
Burton Point	1899	1955	North Wales and Liverpool Railway	
Butts Lane Halt	1907	1938	Liverpool, Southport and Preston Junction Railway	
Canada Dock		1941	London and North Western Railway	
Canada Dock		1956	Liverpool Overhead Railway	
Canning	1893	1956	Liverpool Overhead Railway	
Childwall	1879	1931	Cheshire Lines Committee	
Churchtown	1878	1964	West Lancashire Railway	
Clarence Dock		1956	Liverpool Overhead Railway	
Clubmoor	1927	1960	Cheshire Lines Committee	
Crossens	1878	1964	West Lancashire Railway	
Crown Street	1832	1860	Liverpool and Manchester Railway	
Dingle	1896	1956	Liverpool Overhead Railway	
Edge Lane	1870	1948	London and North Western Railway	
Ford		1951	Lancashire and Yorkshire Railway	
Formby Power Station	c. 1917	c. 1944	Lancashire and Yorkshire Railway	
Garston	1874	2006	Cheshire Lines Committee	Replaced by Liverpool South Parkway
Church Road Garston		1939	London and North Western Railway	
Garston Dock		1947	St Helens and Runcorn Gap Railway	
Gateacre	1879	1972	Cheshire Lines Committee	
Gladstone Dock	1914	1924	Lancashire and Yorkshire Railway	
Gladstone Dock	1930	1956	Liverpool Overhead Railway	
Grange Lane	1840	1844	Chester and Birkenhead Railway	Temporary terminus; closed when the railway was extended to Birkenhead Monks Ferry
Great Howard Street	1844	1850	Lancashire and Yorkshire Railway and East Lancashire Railway	Joint terminus. Replaced by Liverpool Exchange
Halewood (original station)	1874	1951	Cheshire Lines Committee	New station opened in 1988 on a different site
Herculaneum Dock	1893	1956	Liverpool Overhead Railway	
Hesketh Park	1878	1964	West Lancashire Railway	
Heswall (Birkenhead Railway)	1886	1956	Birkenhead Joint Railway	The station now called Heswall (on the Borderlands Line) was called Heswall Hills until 1973
Huskisson		1886	Cheshire Lines Committee	
Huskisson Dock		1956	Liverpool Overhead Railway	
Huyton Quarry	1832	1958	London and North Western Railway	
James Street		1956	Liverpool Overhead Railway	
Kew Gardens	1887	1938	Liverpool, Southport and Preston Junction Railway	
Kirby Park	1891	1954	Birkenhead Joint Railway	
Knotty Ash		1960	Cheshire Lines Committee	
Langton Dock		1956	Liverpool Overhead Railway	
Linacre Road		1951	Lancashire and Yorkshire Railway	
Liscard and Poulton		1960	Wirral Railway	
Liverpool Central High Level	1874	1972	Cheshire Lines Committee	
Liverpool Crown Street	1830	1836	Liverpool and Manchester Railway	
Liverpool Exchange	1850	1977	Lancashire and Yorkshire Railway and East Lancashire Railway	Joint terminus
Liverpool Riverside	1895	1971	Mersey Docks and Harbour Board	Used by boat trains only
Liverpool St James	1874	1917	Cheshire Lines Committee	
Miller's Bridge	Before 1851	c.1876	Liverpool, Crosby and Southport Railway	
Nelson Dock		1956	Liverpool Overhead Railway	
Otterspool		1951	Cheshire Lines Committee	
Pier Head		1956	Liverpool Overhead Railway	
Princes Dock		1956	Liverpool Overhead Railway	
Rainford Village	1858	1951	St Helens Railway	
Rock Lane	1846	1862	Chester and Birkenhead Railway	
Sandon Dock	1893	1896	Liverpool Overhead Railway	
Seacombe		1960	Wirral Railway	
Seaforth Sands		1956	Liverpool Overhead Railway	
Sefton and Maghull		1952	Cheshire Lines Committee	
Sefton Park	1892	1960	London and North Western Railway	
Southport Ash Street	1887	1902	West Lancashire Railway	
Southport Central	1882	1901	West Lancashire Railway	
Southport Eastbank Street	1848	1851	Liverpool, Crosby and Southport Railway	Temporary terminus. Replaced by Southport Chapel Street
Southport London Street	1855	1857	Manchester and Southport Railway	Services transferred to Southport Chapel Street
Southport Lord Street	1884	1952	Cheshire Lines Committee	
St Luke's	1883	1968	Manchester and Southport Railway	
Spellow		1948	London and North Western Railway	
Speke		1930	St Helens Railway	
St Helens Central	1900	1952	Liverpool, St Helens and South Lancashire Railway	
Stanley	1870	1948	London and North Western Railway	
Storeton	1896	1951	Manchester, Sheffield and Lincolnshire Railway and Wrexham, Mold and Connah's Quay Railway	
Thurstaston		1954	Birkenhead Joint Railway	
Toxteth Dock		1956	Liverpool Overhead Railway	
Tranmere	1846	1857	Chester and Birkenhead Railway	Also known as Lime Kiln Lane and St. Paul's Road.
Tue Brook		1948	London and North Western Railway	
Walton & Anfield		1948	London and North Western Railway	
Walton on the Hill		1918	Cheshire Lines Committee	
Wapping Dock		1956	Liverpool Overhead Railway	
Warbreck		1960	Cheshire Lines Committee	
Warren	1888	1915	Seacombe Hoylake and Deeside Railway (Wirral Railway)	
Wavertree		1958	London and North Western Railway	
West Derby		1960	Cheshire Lines Committee	
West Kirby (Birkenhead Joint branch station)	1886	1956	Birkenhead Joint Railway	
Woodvale		1952	Cheshire Lines Committee	

== See also ==
- For current stations by borough, see the categories Railway stations in Knowsley, Railway stations in Liverpool, Railway stations in Sefton, Railway stations in St Helens and Railway stations in Wirral.
- For current stations by line, see Borderlands Line, Liverpool to Manchester Line, Liverpool to Wigan Line, Northern Line, and Wirral Line.

== Footnotes ==
- ^{[a]} Aigburth, Cressington and St Michaels were closed between 1972 and 1978.
- ^{[b]} High Level station opened 1874 and closed 1972. Low Level station opened 1892, closed 1975 and reopened 1977. Deep Level platform opened 1977.
- ^{[c]} Low Level platform opened 1977.
