= Herculaneum (disambiguation) =

Herculaneum was an ancient Roman city.

Herculaneum may also refer to:

== Places ==
- Herculaneum (crater), on Mars
- Herculaneum, Missouri, a city in Jefferson County
- Băile Herculane, a spa town in Caraș-Severin, Romania
- Herculaneum Dock, in Liverpool, UK

== Other uses ==
- Herculaneum papyri, more than 1,800 papyrus scrolls found in the 18th century in the Herculaneum Villa of the Papyri
- Herculaneum Pottery, a pottery based in Toxteth, Liverpool, England. between 1793/94 and 1841
- Herculaneum, a fictional metal in the universe of Blake's 7 which comprises the hull of the Liberator

== See also ==
- Ercolano, an Italian town that surrounds and is named after the Roman city
