= George Fosbery Lyster =

Irish civil engineer (1821–1899)

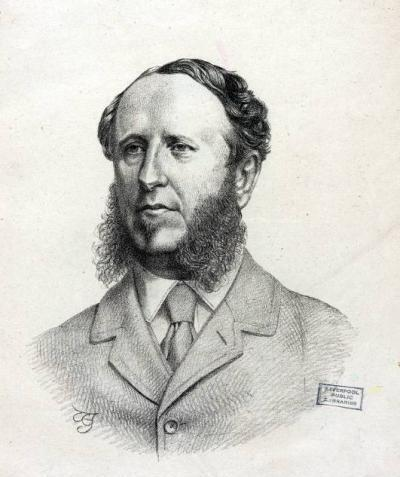
George Fosbery Lyster

George Fosbery Lyster FRSE (1821–1899) succeeded John Hartley as Engineer in Chief to the Mersey Docks and Harbour Board. He is usually referred to as G. F. Lyster.

== Life ==
He was born on 7 September 1821 at Mount Talbot in County Roscommon in Ireland. He was the third son of Col. Anthony Lyster of Lysterfield and Bushey Park (1775–1841), and his wife, Jane Fosbery, the daughter of George Fosbery of Kildimo.

He was educated at King William's College on the Isle of Man. He was apprenticed as an engineer under James Meadows Rendel.

He was responsible for most of the Birkenhead docks and docks at the north end of the dock estate. He also built the Herculaneum Dock, Harrington Dock and Toxteth Dock. He widened the River Shannon and in the 1850s built the Great Harbour of Refuge at Holyhead.

In 1861 he succeeded John Bernard Hartley as Engineer-in-Chief to Liverpool Docks.

In 1886 he was elected a Fellow of the Royal Society of Edinburgh. His proposers were Thomas Stevenson, James Leslie, George Miller Cunningham and David Alan Stevenson.

He died of acute pneumonia on 11 May 1899.

== Family ==
He married twice: firstly, in 1848, to Martha E. Sanderson; secondly, in old age, in 1898 to Blanche E. I. Maude.

He was father to Anthony George Lyster (1852-1920), also a harbour engineer.

Business positions
Preceded by John Bernard Hartley	Engineer to Mersey Docks and Harbour Board; 1861-1897	Succeeded by Anthony George Lyster
