= Huskisson (disambiguation) =

William Huskisson (1770–1830) was a British statesman and diplomat from Liverpool, who met his death as the first notable person to be run over by a railway locomotive.

Huskisson may also refer to:

- Huskisson, New South Wales, a town in Australia, named after William Huskisson
- Huskisson Parish, New Brunswick, Canada
- Huskisson Dock on the River Mersey in Liverpool, named after William
- Huskisson Dock railway station, a former Liverpool Overhead Railway station next to the dock.
- Huskisson railway station, a former railway station near the dock
- Thomas Huskisson, naval officer and half-brother of William
