= Canada Dock (disambiguation) =

Canada Dock can refer to a number of places:

- Canada Dock, dock on the River Mersey and part of the Port of Liverpool, England.
- Canada Dock Branch, a railway line in Liverpool, England
- Canada Dock railway station, the passenger terminus of the Canada Dock Branch, situated near Canada Dock, Liverpool, England
- Canada Dock railway station (Liverpool Overhead Railway) (1893–1956), Liverpool, England
- Canada Dock, now known as Canada Water, former dock of the Surrey Commercial Docks of the Port of London, England
