= Herculaneum Dock railway station =

Former railway station in England

Herculaneum Dock
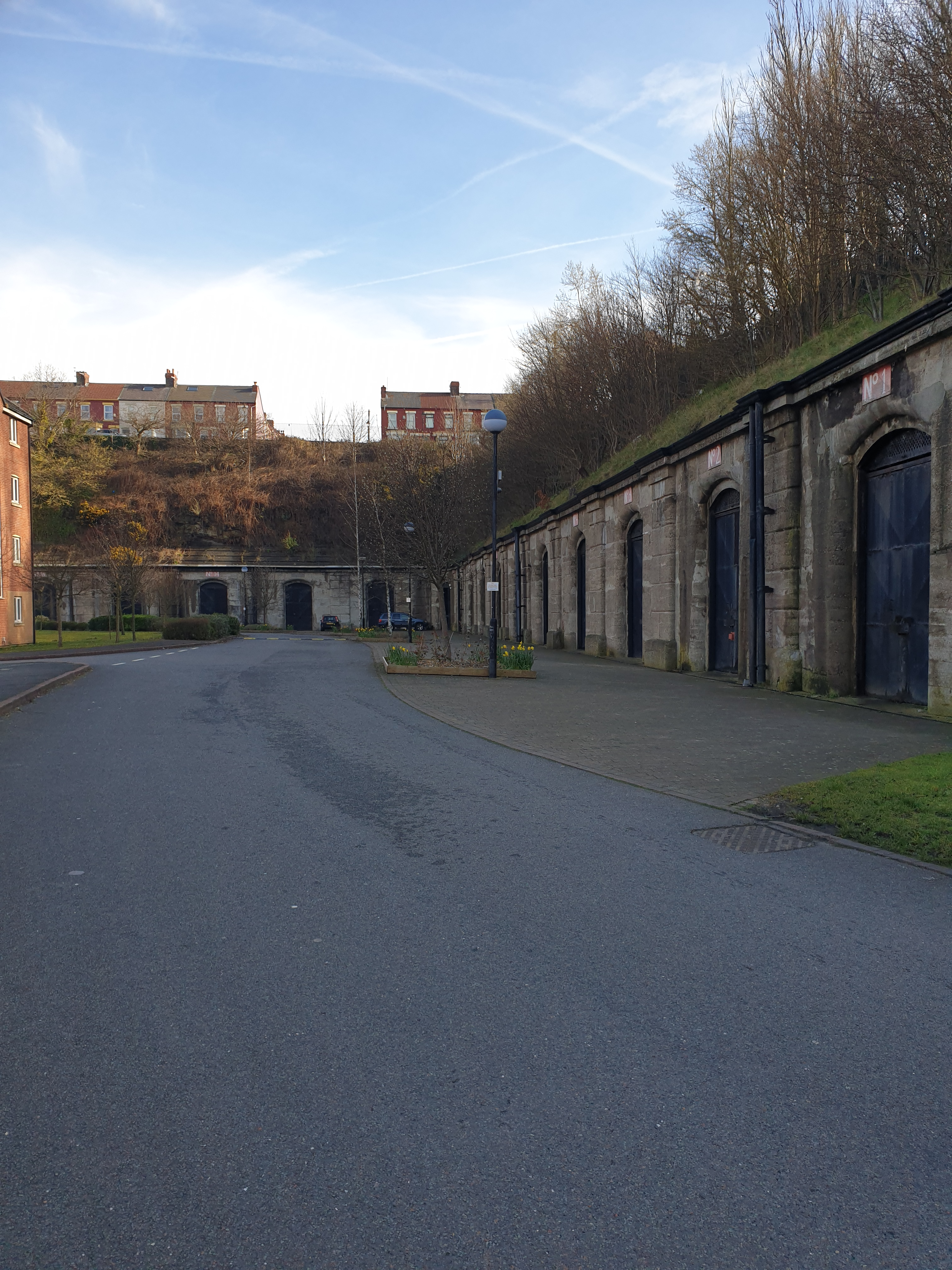

General information
- Location: Liverpool; England
- Coordinates: 53.3808°N 2.9738°W

Other information
- Status: Disused

History
- Original company: Liverpool Overhead Railway

Key dates
- 6 March 1893: Terminus station opened
- 21 December 1896: Replaced by through station
- 30 December 1956: Station closed
Location

Herculaneum Dock railway station was the original southern terminus for the Liverpool Overhead Railway. Actually adjacent to Harrington Dock it was named after Herculaneum Dock, a somewhat larger dock beyond the end of the line. It was opened on 6 March 1893 by the Marquis of Salisbury.

The station became a carriage shed on 21 December 1896, upon the LOR's southern extension through the cliffside to Dingle and the subsequent construction of a 'through' station by the same name slightly north of the original.

The station closed, along with the rest of the line on 30 December 1956. No evidence of this station remains.

Preceding station	Disused railways	Following station
Dingle	Liverpool Overhead Railway	Toxteth Dock
