= Toxteth Dock =

Former dock on the River Mersey, England

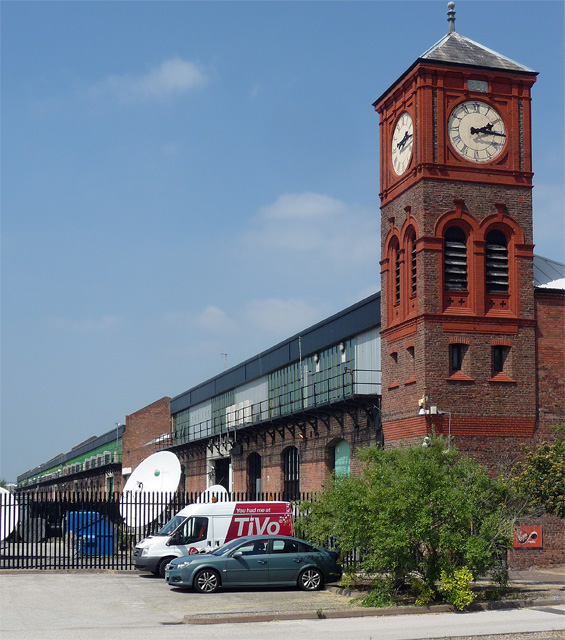
- Former transit shed, Toxteth Dock

Location
- Location: Toxteth, Liverpool, United Kingdom
- Coordinates: 53.3839°N 2.9797°W
- OS grid: SJ348879

Details
- Opened: 1888
- Closed: 1972
- Type: Wet dock
- Area: 1 acre (0.40 ha), 469 sq yd (392 m^{2}) (in 1858)
- Width at entrance: 40 ft (12 m) (in 1858)
- Quay length: 393 yd (359 m) (in 1858)

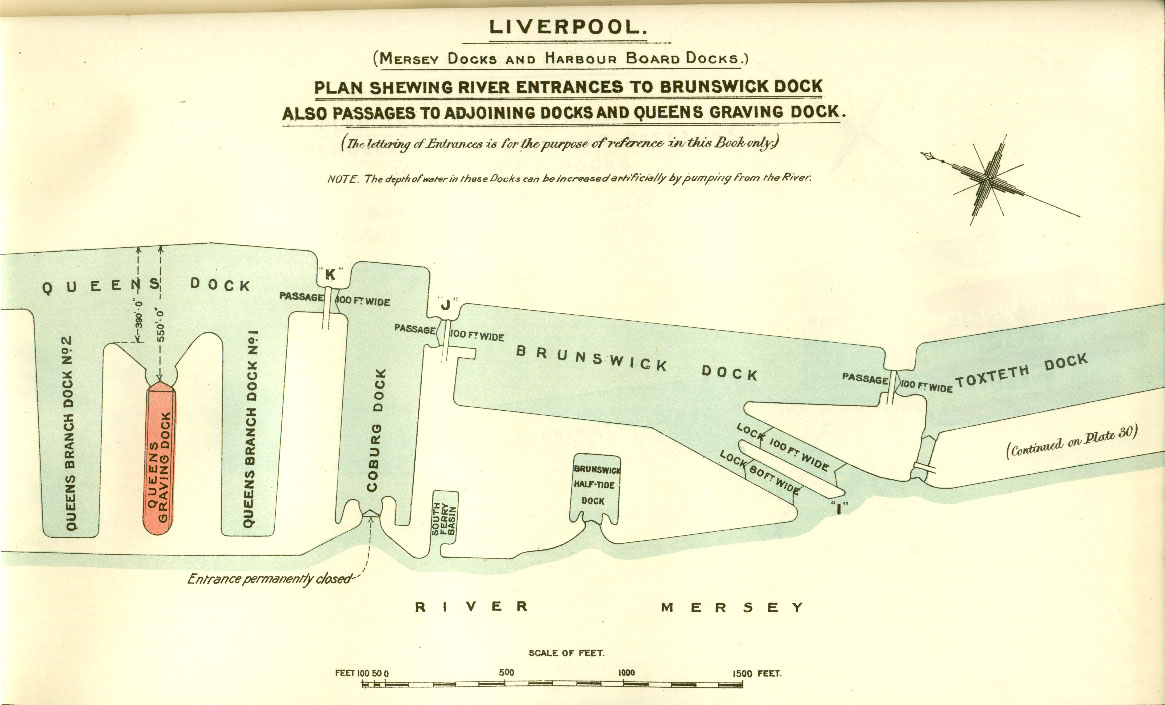
British Empire Dockyards and Ports, 1909: docks to the north

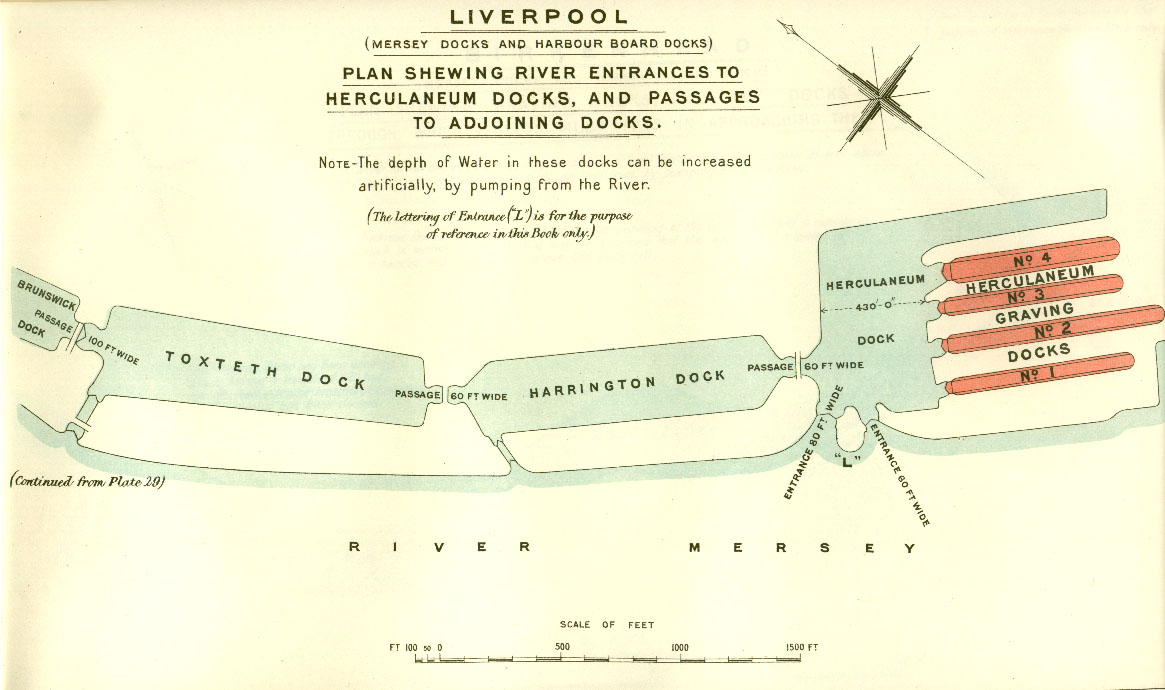
Docks to the south

Toxteth Dock was a dock on the River Mersey that was part of the Port of Liverpool. Part of the southern dock system, it was connected to Brunswick Dock to the north and Harrington Dock to the south.

== History ==
The dock was originally opened in 1841, enlarged between 1882-8 by George Fosbery Lyster and reopening in 1888.Toxteth Dock railway station was opened in 1893 as part of the Liverpool Overhead Railway. It closed in 1956 and was demolished in 1957. For many years, the dock was home to the Harrison Line. The dock closed in 1972 and has since been filled in.

== Present use ==
Most of the dock buildings still exist and are split up into small business units as part of Brunswick Business Park. The Hydraulic Station is Grade II listed, and in modern day in use as a training facility for the British Red Cross. They have drawings and historical documents on display detailing the buildings former use. These list Edmund Kirby as being involved in the refurbishment in 1983.
