= Anthony George Lyster =

British civil engineer (1852–1920)

Anthony Lyster
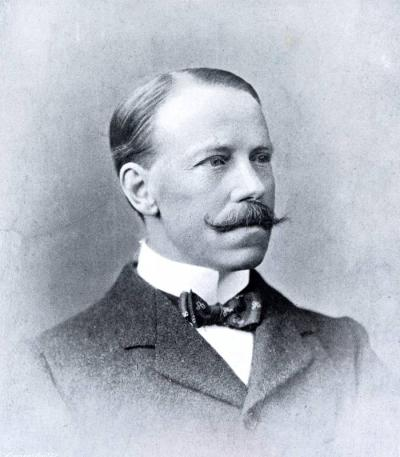
- Born: 1852; Holyhead, Wales
- Died: 17 March 1920 (aged 67–68); Regent's Park, London
- Spouse: Frances Laura Arabella
- Engineering career
- Discipline: Civil
- Institutions: Institution of Civil Engineers (president),
- Projects: Mersey Docks and Harbour, Brunswick Entrance Locks, Vittoria Dock, Stanley Dock Tobacco Warehouse

Anthony George Lyster (1852 – 17 March 1920) was a Welsh-born civil engineer. He was engineer-in-chief to the Mersey Docks and Harbour Board from 1898, when he succeeded his father, George Fosbery Lyster, until his retirement from that role in 1913, when he was honoured with the presidency of the Institution of Civil Engineers, and joined the firm of Sir John Wolfe Barry and Partners.

== Early life and education ==
Born in Holyhead, Wales on 6 April 1852, Lyster was the second son of George Fosbery Lyster, also an engineer. He was educated at Harrow School between 1867 and 1871, followed by a year in Bonn, Germany. He then began his engineering education becoming a pupil of his father who was engineer to the Mersey Docks and Harbour Board.

== Career ==
After his pupilage, he spent time at the firm of Sir W G Armstrong and Company in Newcastle before returning to Liverpool where from 1877 he was in charge of the construction of the north and south dock extension. This was a substantial project with a cost of about £4 million and involving six miles (10 km) of quay.

In 1890, he was appointed Acting Engineer-in-Chief to the Mersey Docks and Harbour Board undertaking significant works to a value of £3.5 million over the next eight years. In 1898 he was confirmed as Engineer-in-Chief. He would hold that post for the next 15 years. His Mersey works included Brunswick Entrance Locks, opened in 1905 and Vittoria Dock, opened in 1909. His last dock before relinquishing his role as Engineer-in-Chief was the Graving Dock at Gladstone Dock in 1913.

However, Lyster is particularly known for the Stanley Dock Tobacco Warehouse completed in 1901. This was, and is, the largest brick warehouse in the world, and when completed was claimed to be the world's largest building by area. It extends along the whole of the south front of Stanley Dock covering 36 acres (15 ha). It is now part of a UNESCO World Heritage Site and has been converted to apartments.

Through his Mersey work, Lyster became a particular expert on the dredging of harbour channels, and alongside his work on the Mersey Docks he was consulted on other harbour works including at New York, Bombay, Port Elizabeth and Shanghai.

In 1908 Lyster was appointed a member of the International Technical Commission for the Suez Canal.

Effective 1 January 1913, Lyster joined the firm of Sir John Wolfe Barry and Partners to work alongside Sir John Wolfe Barry, Edward Cruttwell, and Kenneth Arthur Wolfe Barry. However, Lyster remained Consulting Engineer to the Mersey Docks and Harbour Board continuing a relationship between the Lysters and the Mersey Docks that spanned 50 years and involved spend of £13 million.

== Institutions ==
Lyster was elected a full member of the Institution of Civil Engineers in 1882, and joined its Council in 1904. He became President for the year 1913-1914, the same year in which he had joined Sir John Wolfe Barry and Partners. He was a Vice-President of the Liverpool Engineering Society.

In 1911, his contribution to Liverpool was acknowledged with the Honorary Degree of Master of Engineering being conferred on him by the University of Liverpool, where he was also Associate Professor of Dock and Harbour Engineering.

== Personal life ==
On 3 December 1892, he married Frances Laura Arabella, former wife of the explorer and author Harry de Windt, and sister of the 1st Viscount Long of Wraxall. There were no surviving children from the union, although two children were born, but did not survive long. Lyster died at 10 Gloucester Gate, Regent's Park, London, on 17 March 1920, and was buried at Bradenham, near High Wycombe, Buckinghamshire. His estate was left in trust for a nephew, subject to the life interest of his widow.

Professional and academic associations
Preceded by Robert Elliott-Cooper	President of the Institution of Civil Engineers; November 1913 – November 1914	Succeeded by Benjamin Hall Blyth
Business positions
Preceded by George Fosbery Lyster	Engineer to Mersey Docks and Harbour Board; 1897-1913	Succeeded by
