= Harrington Dock =

Former dock on the River Mersey, England

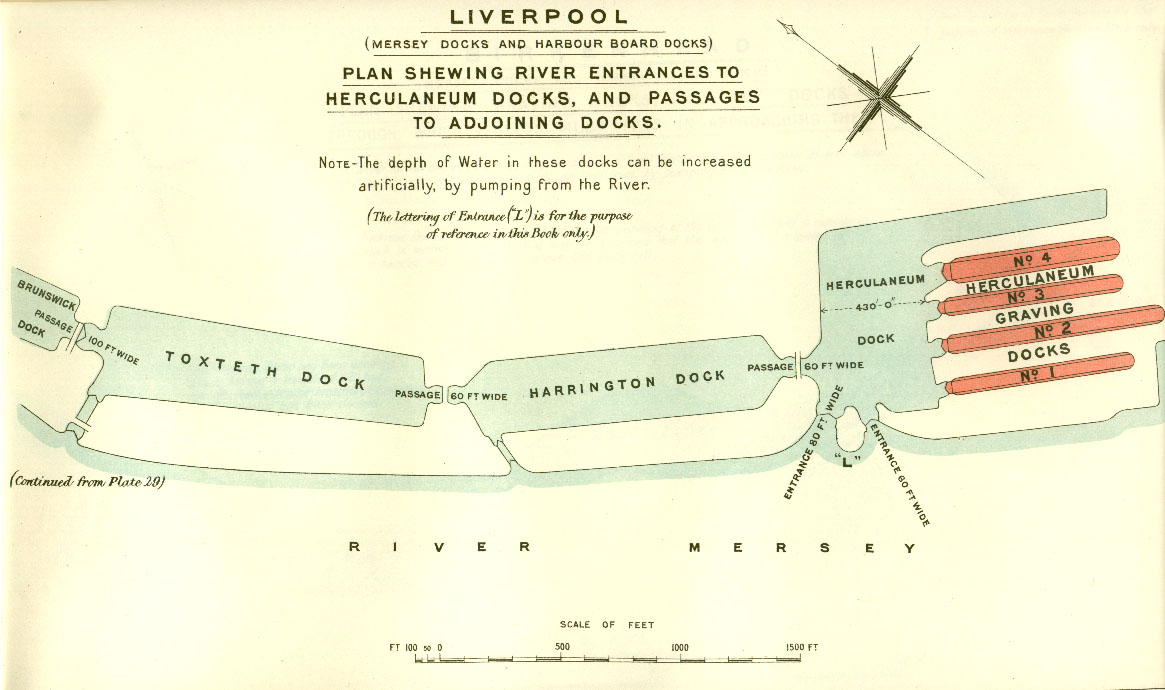
- British Empire Dockyards and Ports, 1909

Location
- Location: Dingle, Merseyside, United Kingdom
- Coordinates: 53.3808°N 2.9753°W
- OS grid: SJ351875

Details
- Opened: 1844
- Closed: 1972
- Type: Wet dock
- Area: 3,740 sq yd (3,130 m^{2}) (in 1858)
- Width at entrance: 29 ft 9 in (9.07 m) (in 1858)
- Quay length: 315 yd (288 m) (in 1858)

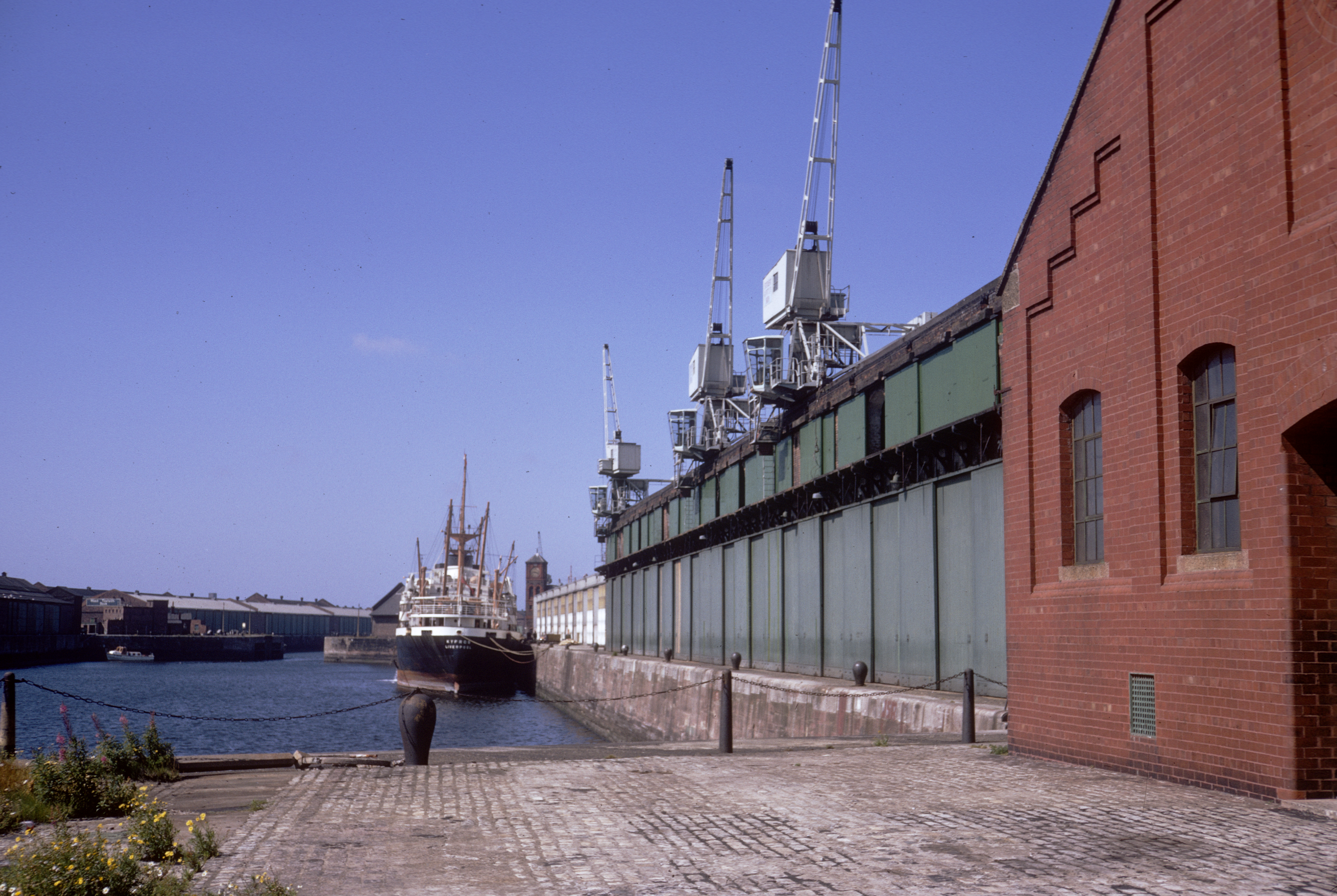
Harrington Dock, view towards the north-west (NW)

Harrington Dock was a dock on the River Mersey and part of the Port of Liverpool. Situated in the southern dock system, it was connected to Toxteth Dock to the north and Herculaneum Dock to the south.

== History ==
The first dock on the site was known as Egerton Dock, named after the Dukes of Bridgewater, built between 1837-9. The first dock was small, with a 20 ft (6.1 m)-wide entrance, and intended for river and canal boats moving timber. In 1839, Jesse Hartley and his son were employed by a separate private company to design two further small basins on the site, known as Harrington Dock and Harrington Dry Basin. The name of the dock can be traced to the district of Harrington, intended for a planned overflow town for Liverpool which never came to fruition. The district of Harrington, itself, was named in honour of Lady Isabella Stanhope, daughter of William Stanhope, 2nd Earl of Harrington and wife of Charles Molyneux, 1st Earl of Sefton who owned the former Royal Forest of Toxteth Park. The dock was bought and opened in 1844, although not commercially successful. By 1858, the dock primarily traded with the west coast of South America. The land was eventually acquired by the Liverpool Dock Trust. Harrington Dock was enlarged by George Fosbery Lyster between 1875-83 and the new Harrington Dock was opened in 1882.

A tunnel from the Garston and Liverpool Railway emerged at the dock, and the second Herculaneum Dock railway station of the Liverpool Overhead Railway was adjacent to the dock from 1896. The dock was further improved in 1898, by widening the entrances and deepening the dock. Harrington Dock was used by the Elder Dempster Lines and its associated businesses.

The dock closed in 1972 and has since been filled in. Most of the dock buildings still exist and are divided into small business units as part of Brunswick Business Park.
