= Leonard Campbell Taylor =

British artist

- Leonard Campbell Taylor by Bassano Ltd, 1929
- Born: 12 December 1874; Oxford, England
- Died: 1 July 1969 (aged 94)
- Education: Royal Academy School; Cheltenham College; Ruskin School; St John's Wood Art School
- Known for: Painting

Leonard Campbell Taylor RA (12 December 1874 – 1 July 1969) was a British painter, mainly of portraits and interiors in a traditional style. Among his patrons was the founding family of Courtaulds and the Courtauld Institute of Art. He was a member of the Royal Academy.

== Biography ==
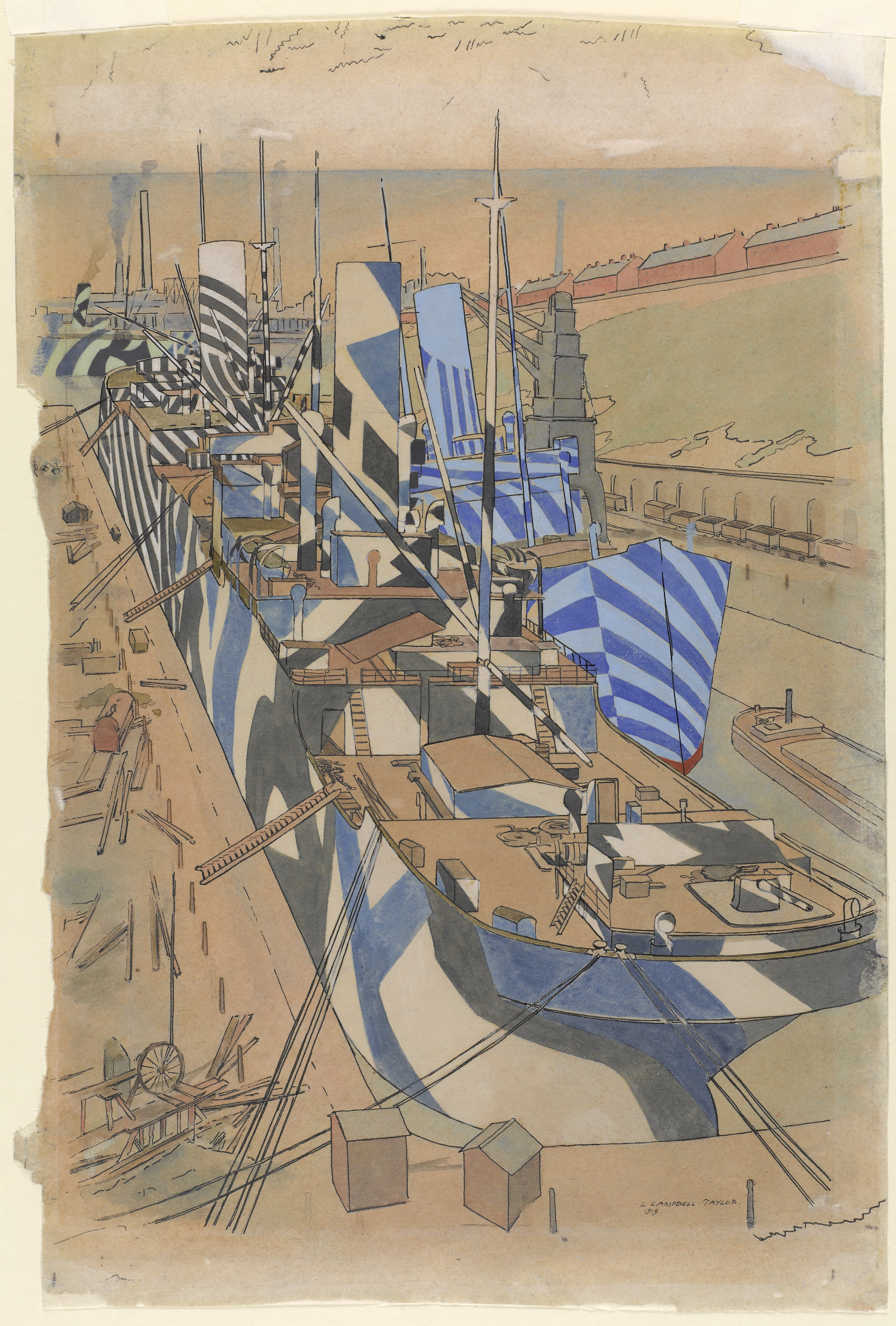
Herculaneum Dock, Liverpool

Taylor was born on 12 December 1874 in Oxford, England. He was the son of James Taylor, organist at New College, Oxford and for the University of Oxford. He studied at the Dragon School preparatory school when it was still located in Crick Road under its first headmaster, Rev. A. E. Clark. He was the second of four brothers at the school, and designed a front cover for the school magazine, The Draconian, in 1900. From 1895 to 1900, he was a student as the Royal Academy School. He went on to study at Cheltenham College with a scholarship and then the Ruskin School in Oxford, before moving on to the St John's Wood Art School, in London in 1905.

During the First World War, he served as an official war artist. He served with the Surrey Volunteer Regiment from 1916 to 1917; he became a lieutenant with the Royal Navy Volunteer Reserve in 1918. His war art is primarily "documentary" in nature and painstakingly accurate. In 1919, he painted Herculaneum Dock, a depiction of ships in dazzle camouflage at Liverpool's docks, rendered in accurate detail.

Taylor exhibited primarily in London and Paris, and lived in Suffolk. He first exhibited at the Royal Academy in 1899, and became a full member in 1931.
