= Wapping Dock railway station =

Former railway station in England

Wapping Dock
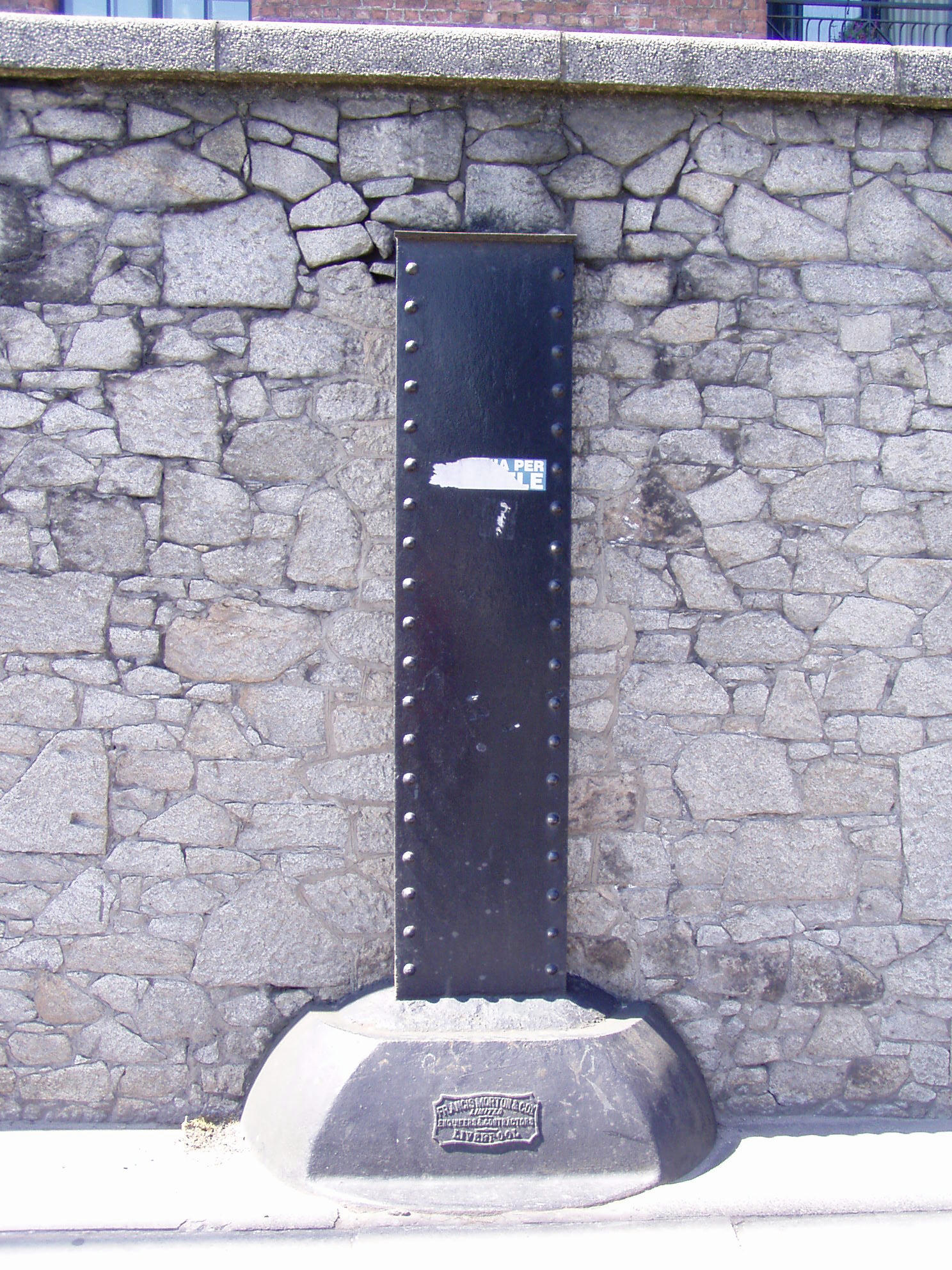

General information
- Location: Liverpool, Liverpool, Merseyside; England
- Coordinates: 53.3962°N 2.9852°W
- Grid reference: SJ345893
- Platforms: 2

Other information
- Status: Disused

History
- Post-grouping: Liverpool Overhead Railway

Key dates
- 6 March 1893: Opened
- 31 December 1956: Closed completely
Location

Wapping Dock railway station was on the Liverpool Overhead Railway, adjacent to the dock of the same name. It was primarily used for access to the large warehouses nearby.

It was opened on 6 March 1893 by the Marquis of Salisbury. The station received some damage during the Liverpool Blitz.

The station closed, along with the rest of the line on 31 December 1956. No evidence of this station remains, save for a small number of supporting columns set into the walls at Wapping.

Preceding station	Disused railways	Following station
Brunswick Dock	Liverpool Overhead Railway	Canning
