= Clarence Dock railway station =

Former railway station in England

Clarence Dock

General information
- Location: Liverpool, Liverpool, Merseyside; England
- Coordinates: 53.4205°N 3.0004°W
- Platforms: 2

Other information
- Status: Disused

History
- Post-grouping: Liverpool Overhead Railway

Key dates
- 6 March 1893: Opened
- 30 Dec 1956: Closed completely
Location

Clarence Dock was a railway station on the Liverpool Overhead Railway, adjacent to the dock of the same name.

It was opened on 6 March 1893 by the Marquis of Salisbury.

The station closed, along with the rest of the line on 30 December 1956. No trace of this station remains.

Preceding station	Disused railways	Following station
Princes Dock	Liverpool Overhead Railway	Nelson Dock
