= Sandon Dock railway station =

Former railway station in England

Coordinates: 53.4288°N 2.9982°W

Sandon Dock

General information
- Location: Liverpool, Liverpool, Merseyside; England
- Platforms: 2

Other information
- Status: Disused

History
- Post-grouping: Liverpool Overhead Railway

Key dates
- 6 March 1893: Opened
- May 1896: Closed
Location

Sandon Dock was a railway station on the Liverpool Overhead Railway, adjacent to the dock of the same name.

It was opened on 6 March 1893 by the Marquis of Salisbury. The station had a hydraulic lift bridge which enabled a section of track to be lifted up to allow large vehicles to pass underneath.

The station was an early closure, closing in 1896, to be replaced by nearby Huskisson Dock and Nelson Dock, located to the north and south respectively. No trace of this station remains.

| Preceding station | Disused railways | Following station |
|---|---|---|
| Nelson Dock | Liverpool Overhead Railway | Huskisson Dock |
