= Nelson Dock railway station =

Former railway station in England

Nelson Dock

General information
- Location: Liverpool, Liverpool, Merseyside; England
- Coordinates: 53.4239°N 3.0005°W
- Platforms: 2

Other information
- Status: Disused

History
- Post-grouping: Liverpool Overhead Railway

Key dates
- May 1896: Opened
- 30 December 1956: Closed completely
Location

Nelson Dock was a railway station on the Liverpool Overhead Railway, adjacent to the dock of the same name.

It was opened in May 1896 and replaced nearby Sandon Dock, which was closed at the same time.

The station closed, along with the rest of the line on 30 December 1956. No evidence of this station remains.

Preceding station	Disused railways	Following station
Clarence Dock	Liverpool Overhead Railway	Sandon Dock
