= Langton Dock railway station =

Disused railway station in England

Langton Dock

General information
- Location: Liverpool, Liverpool, Merseyside; England
- Coordinates: 53.4461°N 3.0038°W
- Platforms: 2

Other information
- Status: Disused

History
- Post-grouping: Liverpool Overhead Railway

Key dates
- May 1896: Opened
- 5 March 1906: Closed completely
Location

Langton Dock was a railway station on the Liverpool Overhead Railway, adjacent to the dock of the same name.

It was opened in May 1896 due to demand from the busy nature of the dock. The station had a hydraulic lift bridge which enabled a section of track to be lifted up to allow large vehicles to pass underneath.

The station closed on 5 March 1906. No evidence of this station remains.

Preceding station	Disused railways	Following station
Brocklebank Dock	Liverpool Overhead Railway	Alexandra Dock
