= James Street railway station (Liverpool Overhead Railway) =

Former railway station on the Liverpool Overhead Railway in Liverpool, England

James Street

General information
- Location: Liverpool, Liverpool, Merseyside; England
- Coordinates: 53.4040°N 2.9926°W
- Grid reference: SJ341902
- Platforms: 2

Other information
- Status: Disused

History
- Post-grouping: Liverpool Overhead Railway

Key dates
- 6 March 1893: Opened
- 30 December 1956: Closed completely
Location

James Street was a railway station on the Liverpool Overhead Railway, located just south of its namesake, within the city centre, close to the still-open Merseyrail James Street station.

It was opened on 6 March 1893 by the Marquess of Salisbury. The station was primarily used by workers travelling to the shipping offices and the Corn Exchange. Passengers could also use it to change for the Merseyrail station of the same name.

The station closed, along with the rest of the line, on 30 December 1956. No evidence of this station remains.

Preceding station	Disused railways	Following station
Canning	Liverpool Overhead Railway	Pier Head
