= Mount Talbot =

Mountain in Alberta and British Columbia, Canada

- Location within Alberta Location within British Columbia Location within Canada

Highest point
- Elevation: 2,373 m (7,785 ft)
- Prominence: 234 m (768 ft)
- Listing: Mountains of Alberta; Mountains of British Columbia
- Coordinates: 53°36′56″N 119°43′00″W

Geography
- Country: Canada
- Provinces: Alberta and British Columbia
- Parent range: Front Ranges
- Topo map: NTS 83E12 Pauline Creek

Mount Talbot is located on the northern side of Shale Pass on the Alberta-British Columbia border. It was officially named on 4 November 1925 after Senator Peter Talbot (1854-1919), an early pioneer of the Lacombe region of central Alberta. A teacher and farmer, he turned to politics and became an elected representative of the Northwest Territories and later the province of Alberta. In 1906, Sir Wilfrid Laurier appointed him to the Senate of Canada.

== See also ==
- List of peaks on the Alberta–British Columbia border
