= Brunswick Dock railway station =

Disused railway station in England

Brunswick Dock

General information
- Location: Liverpool, Liverpool, Merseyside; England
- Coordinates: 53.3905°N 2.9815°W
- Grid reference: SJ348886
- Platforms: 2

Other information
- Status: Disused

History
- Post-grouping: Liverpool Overhead Railway

Key dates
- 6 March 1893: Opened
- 30 December 1956: Closed completely
Location

Brunswick Dock railway station was on the Liverpool Overhead Railway, adjacent to Brunswick Dock and in close proximity to the Cheshire Lines Committee's extensive goods yard of the same name.

It was opened on 6 March 1893 by Robert Cecil, 3rd Marquess of Salisbury. The station had a hydraulic lift bridge which enabled a section of track to be lifted up to allow large vehicles to pass underneath. It was heavily bombed during the Liverpool Blitz.

The station closed, along with the rest of the line on 30 December 1956. No evidence of the station remains.

| Preceding station | Disused railways | Following station |
|---|---|---|
| Toxteth Dock | Liverpool Overhead Railway | Wapping Dock |
