= Princes Dock railway station =

Former railway station in England

Princes Dock

General information
- Location: Liverpool, Liverpool, Merseyside; England
- Coordinates: 53.4117°N 2.9993°W
- Grid reference: SJ336911
- Platforms: 2

Other information
- Status: Disused

History
- Post-grouping: Liverpool Overhead Railway

Key dates
- 6 March 1893: Opened
- 13 March 1941: Closed completely
Location

Princes Dock was a railway station on the Liverpool Overhead Railway, adjacent to the dock of the same name.

It was opened on 6 March 1893 by the Marquis of Salisbury.

The station closed, on 13 March 1941, due to extensive damage during the World War II Blitz. No evidence of this station remains.

| Preceding station | Disused railways | Following station |
|---|---|---|
| Pier Head | Liverpool Overhead Railway | Clarence Dock |
