= Pier Head railway station =

Former railway station in Liverpool, England

Pier Head

General information
- Location: Liverpool, Liverpool, Merseyside; England
- Coordinates: 53.4060°N 2.9951°W
- Grid reference: SJ339904
- Platforms: 2

Other information
- Status: Disused

History
- Post-grouping: Liverpool Overhead Railway

Key dates
- 6 March 1893: Opened
- 30 December 1956: Closed completely
Location

Pier Head was a railway station on the Liverpool Overhead Railway. Opened on 6 March 1893 by the Marquis of Salisbury, it was located close to the landing stage of the Mersey Ferry, and next to the land on which the Royal Liver Building was built in 1911.

The station was the busiest railway station on the overhead network, providing connections to trams, buses and ferries. When constructed it was expected to be this busy, and so additional staircases were built.

The station closed, along with the rest of the line on 30 December 1956. No evidence of this station remains.

Preceding station	Disused railways	Following station
James St. (LOR)	Liverpool Overhead Railway	Princes Dock
