= Herculaneum Pottery =

Pottery manufacturer based in Liverpool, England

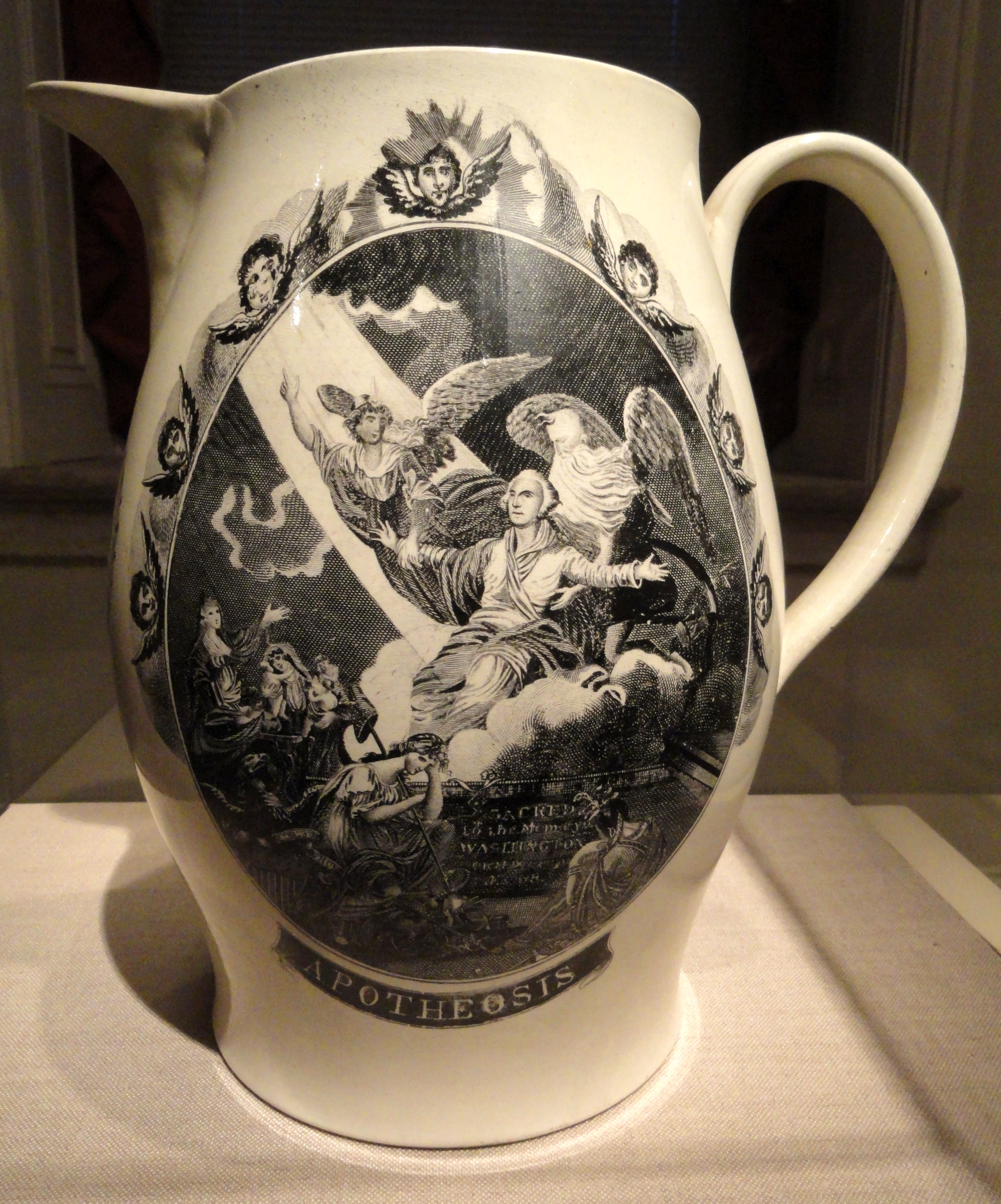
Apotheosis of George Washington, pitcher by Herculaneum Pottery, c. 1800–1805.

The Herculaneum Pottery was based in Toxteth, Liverpool, England. between 1793/94 and 1841. They made creamware and pearlware pottery as well as bone china porcelain.

About 1793-4 Richard Abbey, who had been apprenticed to John Sadler, an engraver, started a pottery at Toxteth Park, on the north side of the River Mersey, along with a Scotsman named John Graham. In 1796 they sold the business to Worthington, Humble & Holland, who engaged as manager Ralph Mansfield, of Burslem. He left them after some years' service, and commenced a small pottery on his own account. In addition to Mansfield, the new company engaged about forty men from the Staffordshire potteries, and they were transported there by boat. The buildings acquired from Abbey were considerably enlarged and improved, and as Wedgwood had called his new colony "Etruria", the company christened theirs "Herculaneum".

The first productions were transfer-printed earthenware, which was carefully potted and of a somewhat deeper shade than that of Wedgwood. The company must have done a good trade with America, because there are many pieces bearing American designs and emblems. Some services had the embossed basket rims, and one of these was printed with views of well-known English scenery. Terra-cotta vases and statuettes in black basaltes were also made, as were also jugs with relief figures. In 1800 the manufactory was considerably enlarged, and again in 1806. Early in the 19th century china was produced, and its manufacture was continued to the close of the works.

In 1833 the company was dissolved, and sold for £25,000 ($125,000) to Mr. Ambrose Lace, who leased the premises to Thomas Case and James Mort. They introduced as a trademark the Liver, which is the crest of the borough of Liverpool. In 1836 they were succeeded by Mort & Simpson, who continued until the close of the works in 1841. Early wares were marked "HERCULANEUM".

The company gave its name to the Herculaneum Dock which occupied the site later.

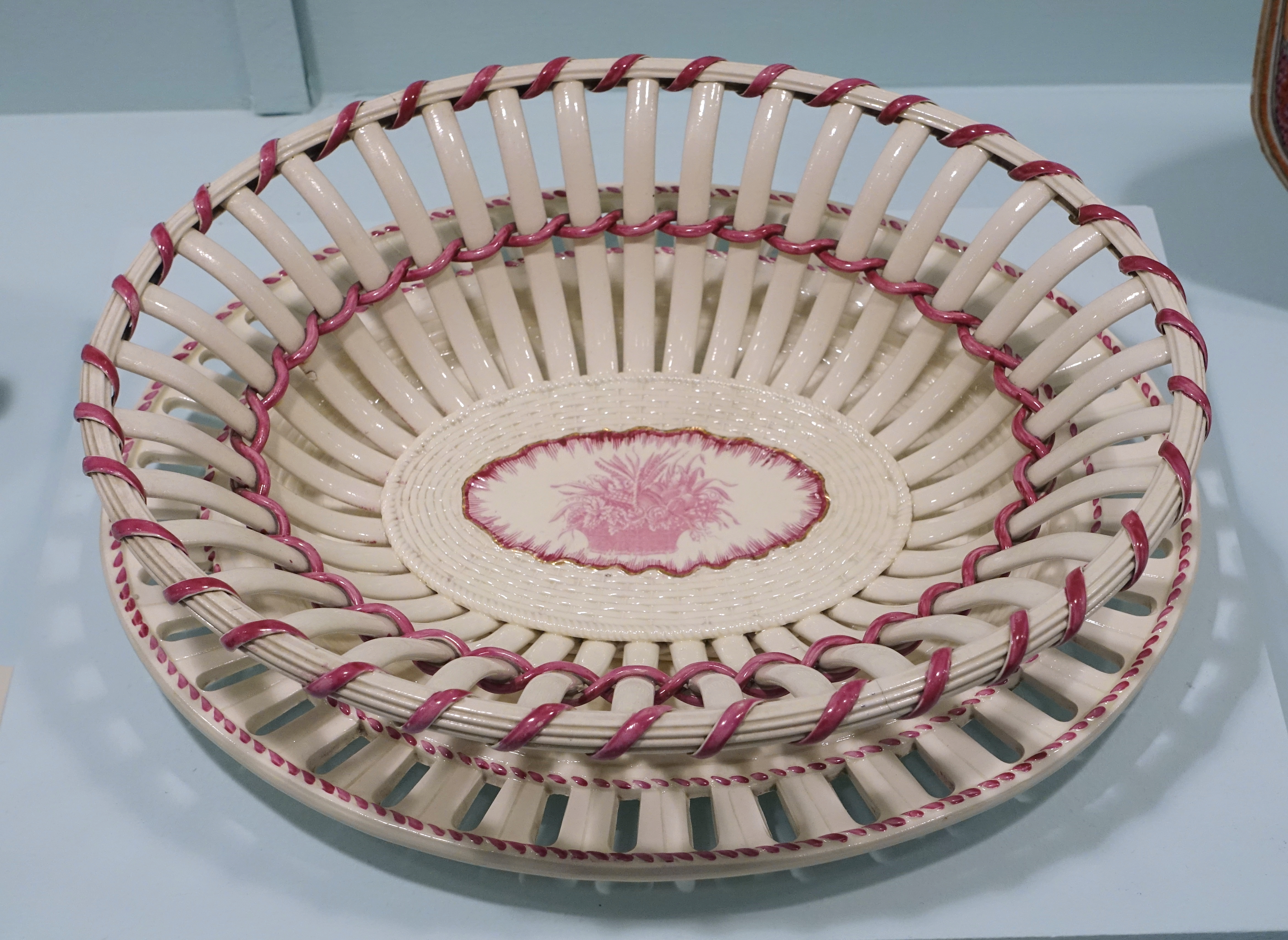
Creamware basket and stand, c. 1796–1805

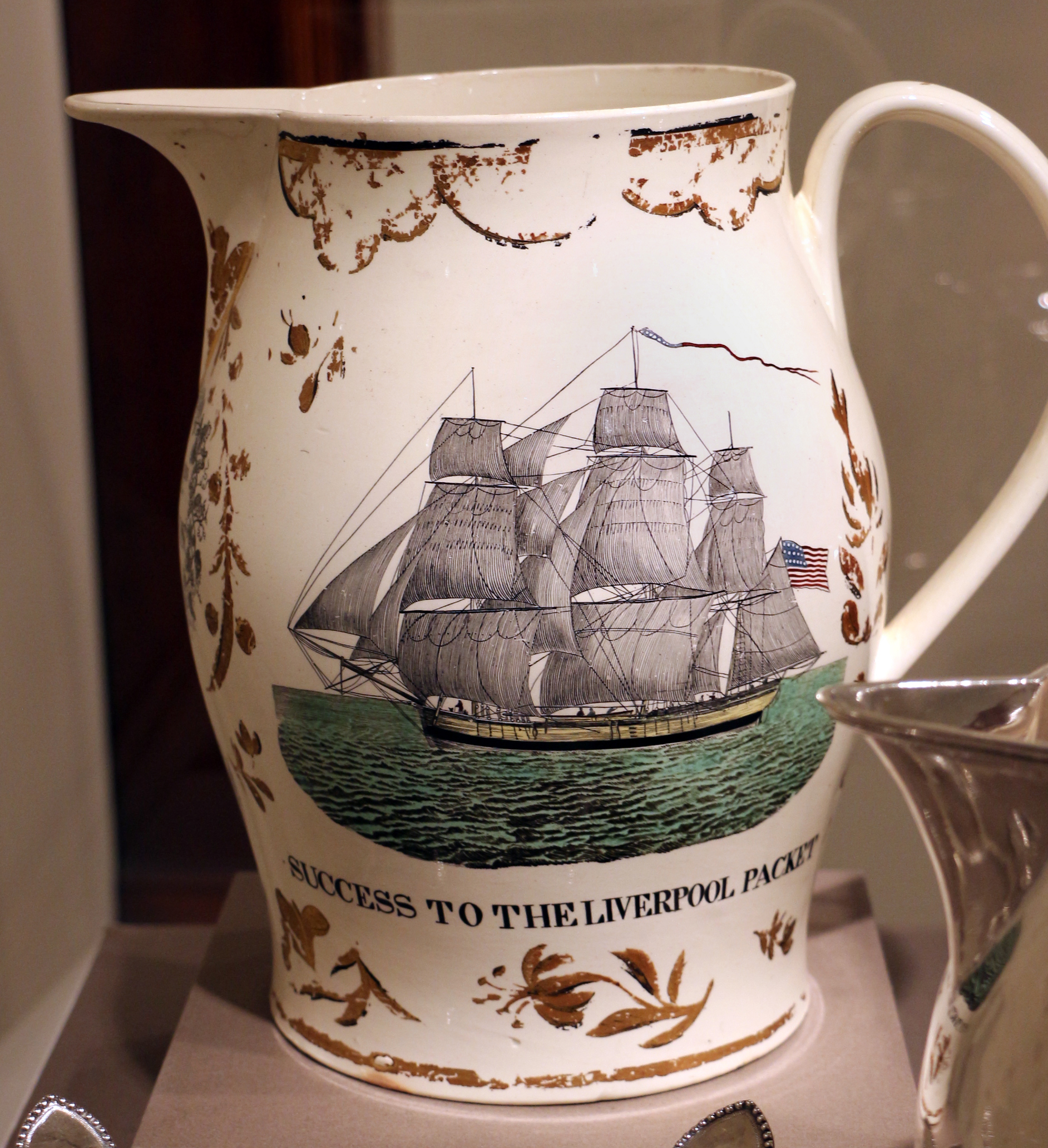
Jug 1880-05 "Success to the Liverpool Packet", which flies an American flag. Inscribed "presentation" wares for ships were a speciality of Liverpool potters.

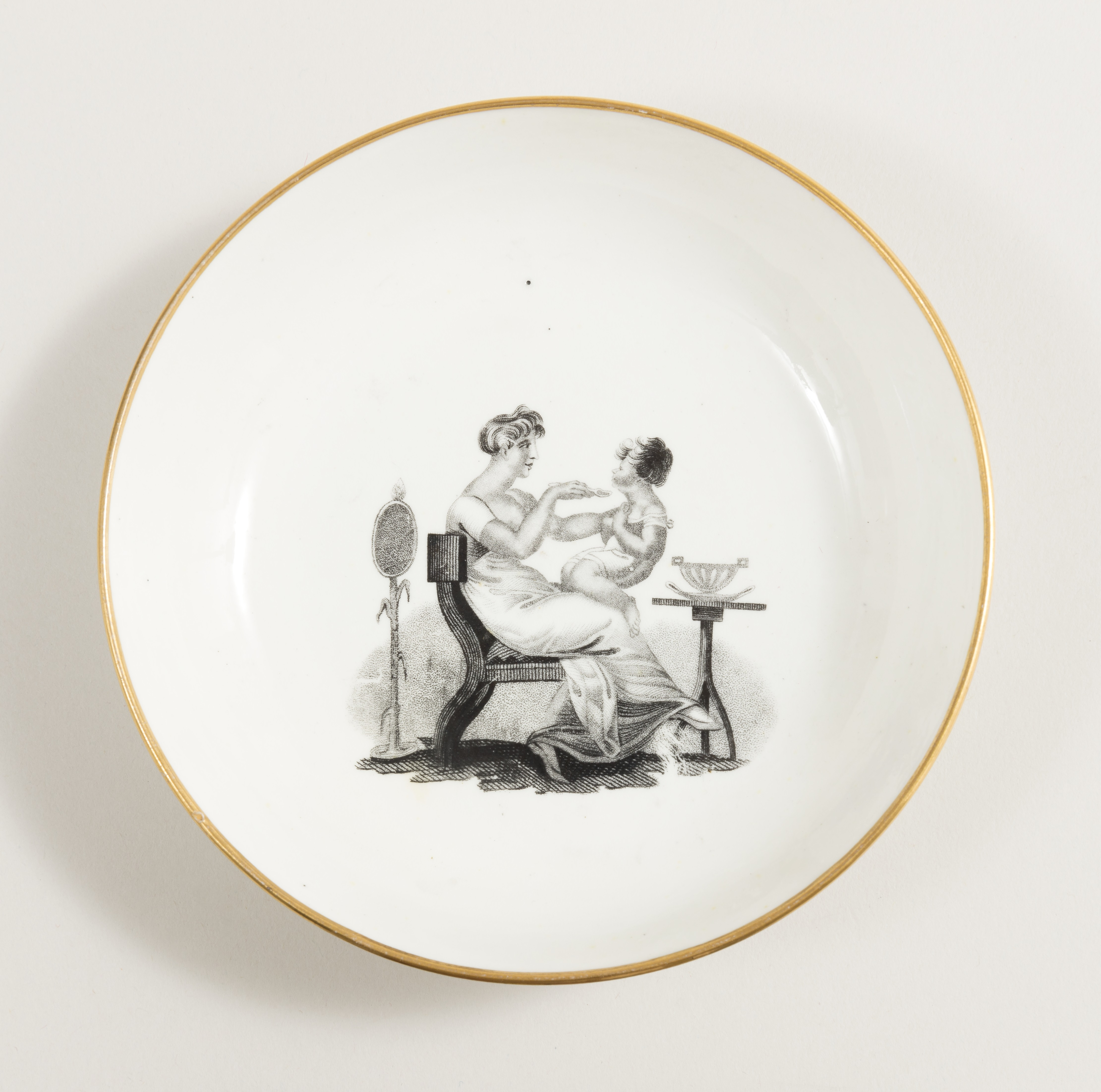
Transfer-printed dish, c. 1810

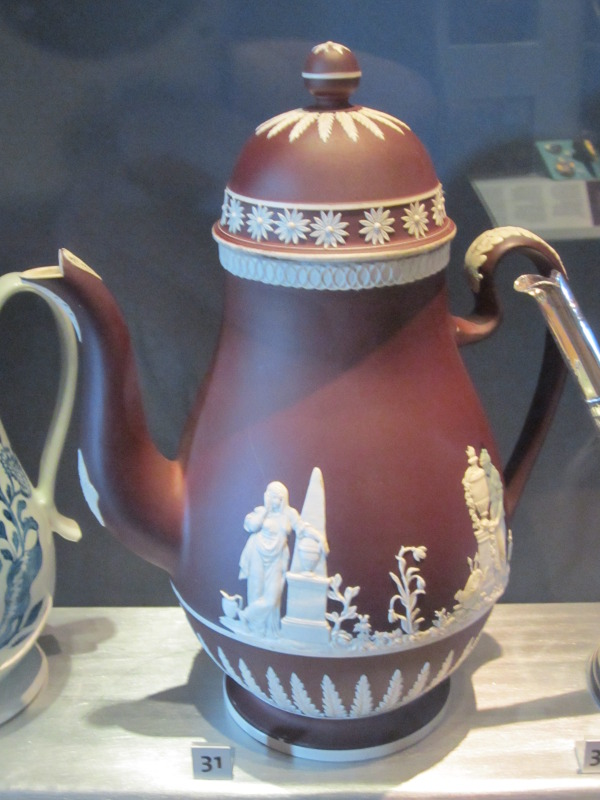
Imitation jasperware coffeepot, 1800–1810
