= Canning railway station =

Disused railway station in England

Canning

General information
- Location: Liverpool, Liverpool, Merseyside; England
- Coordinates: 53.4021°N 2.9899°W
- Grid reference: SJ343898
- Platforms: 2

Other information
- Status: Disused

History
- Post-grouping: Liverpool Overhead Railway

Key dates
- 6 March 1893: Opened
- 30 December 1956: Closed completely
Location

Canning railway station (previously Custom House station) was a railway station on the Liverpool Overhead Railway.

It was opened on 6 March 1893 by the Marquis of Salisbury, originally as Custom House station, due to its nearby location to Custom House, Liverpool, which was heavily bombed during The Blitz. After Customs moved to a new building the station was renamed Canning in 1947, so as not to confuse passengers. Providing access to Custom House and a number of other busy work locations, Canning was one of the busiest stations on the railway.

The station closed, along with the rest of the line on 30 December 1956. No evidence of this station remains.

Preceding station	Disused railways	Following station
Wapping Dock	Liverpool Overhead Railway	James St. (LOR)
