= Toxteth Dock railway station =

Former railway station in England

Toxteth

General information
- Location: Liverpool, Liverpool; England
- Coordinates: 53.3849°N 2.9788°W
- Grid reference: SJ349880
- Platforms: 2

Other information
- Status: Disused

History
- Original company: Liverpool Overhead Railway

Key dates
- 6 March 1893: Station opened
- 30 December 1956: Station closed
Location

Toxteth Dock railway station was on the Liverpool Overhead Railway, adjacent to the dock of the same name and the Brunswick Goods station on the Cheshire Lines railway, England. It was situated above a London Midland & Scottish goods railway station.

It was opened on 6 March 1893 by the Marquis of Salisbury and closed, along with the rest of the line, on 30 December 1956. No evidence of this station remains.

Preceding station	Disused railways	Following station
Herculaneum Dock	Liverpool Overhead Railway	Brunswick Dock
