= Brocklebank Dock railway station =

Disused railway station in England

Brocklebank Dock

General information
- Location: Liverpool, Liverpool, Merseyside; England
- Coordinates: 53.4434°N 3.0020°W
- Platforms: 2

Other information
- Status: Disused

History
- Post-grouping: Liverpool Overhead Railway

Key dates
- 6 March 1893: Opened
- 30 Dec 1956: Closed completely
Location

Brocklebank Dock was a railway station on the Liverpool Overhead Railway, adjacent to the dock of the same name. It became particularly busy after Langton Dock station was closed in 1906, with workers of the Langton Dock using it instead.

It was opened on 6 March 1893 by the Marquis of Salisbury.

The station closed, along with the rest of the line on 30 December 1956. No evidence of this station remains.

Preceding station	Disused railways	Following station
Canada Dock	Liverpool Overhead Railway	Langton Dock
