= Herculaneum Dock =

Part of the Port of Liverpool

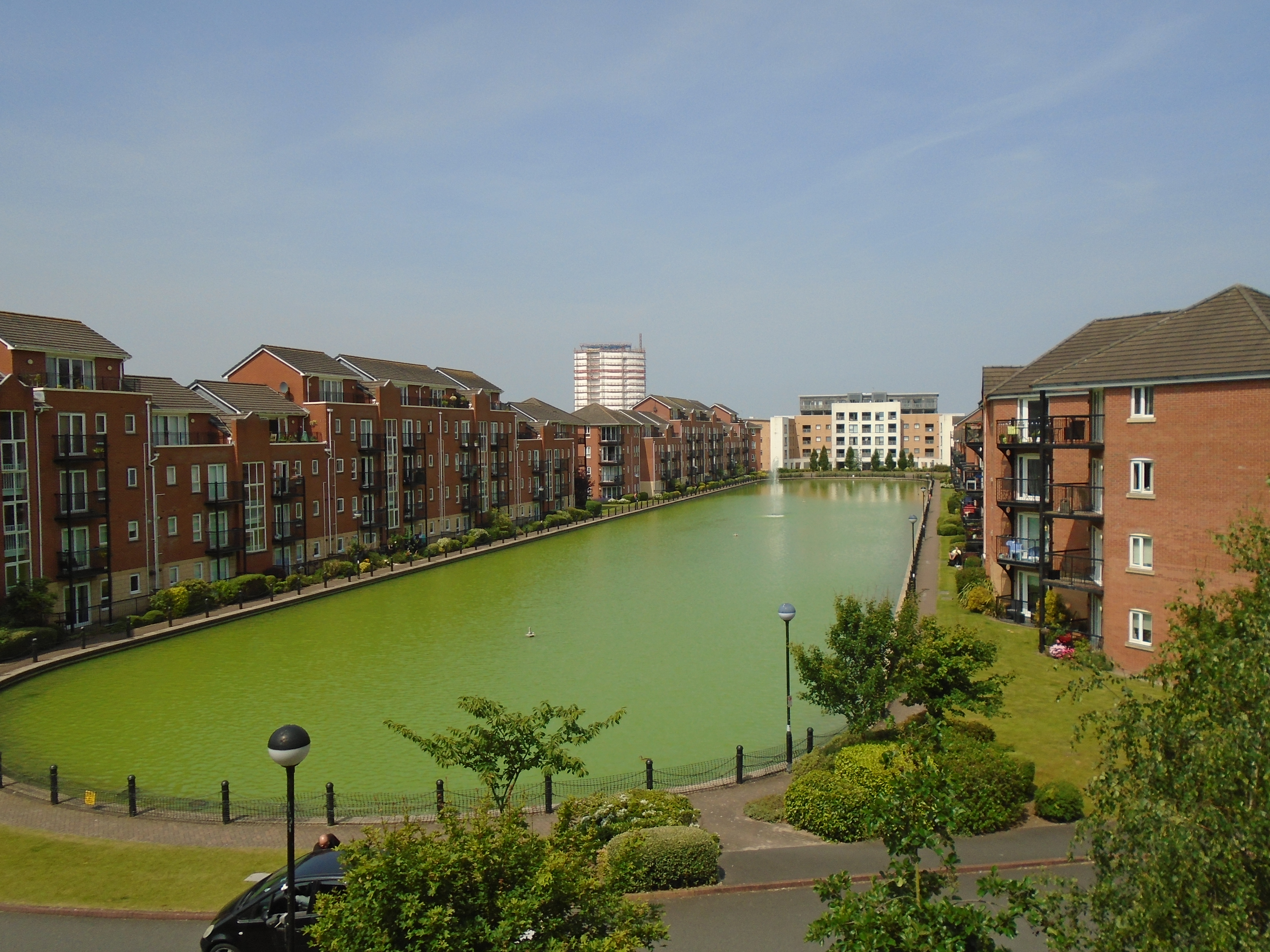
- Housing development on the site of the former Graving Dock No. 4

Location
- Location: Riverside, Liverpool, Merseyside, United Kingdom
- Coordinates: 53.3786°N 2.9701°W
- OS grid: SJ354873

Details
- Opened: 1866
- Closed: 1972
- Type: Wet dock

Herculaneum Dock was part of the Port of Liverpool in Liverpool, England. It was at the south end of the Liverpool dock system, on the River Mersey. To the north it was connected to Harrington Dock. The dock was named after the Herculaneum Pottery Company that had previously occupied the site.

== History ==
From 1767, a tidal basin in the area that would become the dock was used for unloading copper for a smelting works. Between 1794 and 1841 it was the site of a pottery. In 1864, a new dock designed by George Fosbery Lyster was blasted from the foreshore, providing two graving docks. This dock opened in 1866. Ten years later, a third graving dock was added.

Beginning in 1873, the dock handled petroleum. In 1878, specialist casemates were built to store this and other volatile cargo within the sandstone cliffs above. The dock continued in this capacity until the task of oil handling was transferred across the river to Tranmere Oil Terminal and Stanlow Oil Refinery. During 1881 the dock facility was enlarged further and a fourth graving dock was constructed in 1902.

Liverpool remained an important port during the Second World War, with Herculaneum Dock acting as a terminus for the North Atlantic Convoys.

Herculaneum Dock was formerly served by its own station on the Liverpool Overhead Railway. The station (and railway) closed on 30 December 1956. By 1958 demolition of the station had been completed.

Herculaneum Dock closed in 1972, being filled in during the 1980s to create a car park.

== After closure ==
The area south of the dock contained a tank farm; this was reclaimed for the Liverpool Garden Festival and residential properties.

In 2004, the site was bought by national property developer David McLean Homes and a riverside residential development, called City Quay, Liverpool was built on the dock.

Since the closing of Herculaneum Dock, what was the main dock area now comprises car parks, a fitness club, a Car dealership and residential buildings. Graving docks 1 2 and 3 are now occupied by residential buildings. Graving Dock no.4 has been restored as a water feature within the residential estate. The map of 1901 shows the entrance to the dock with the letter 'L'. A restaurant has since been built on this.

== Images of Herculaneum Dock ==
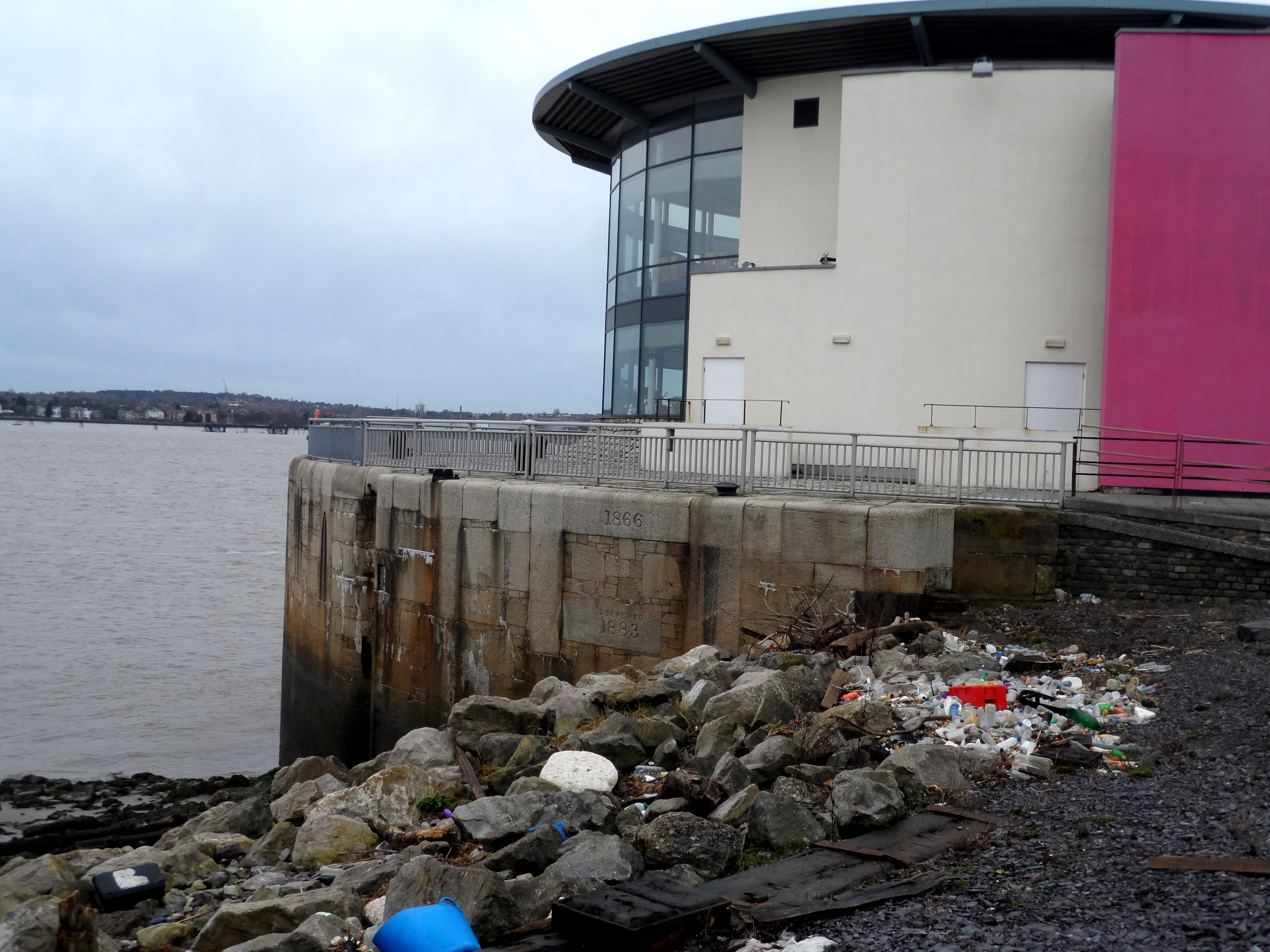
The infilled entrance to Herculaneum Dock in 2014

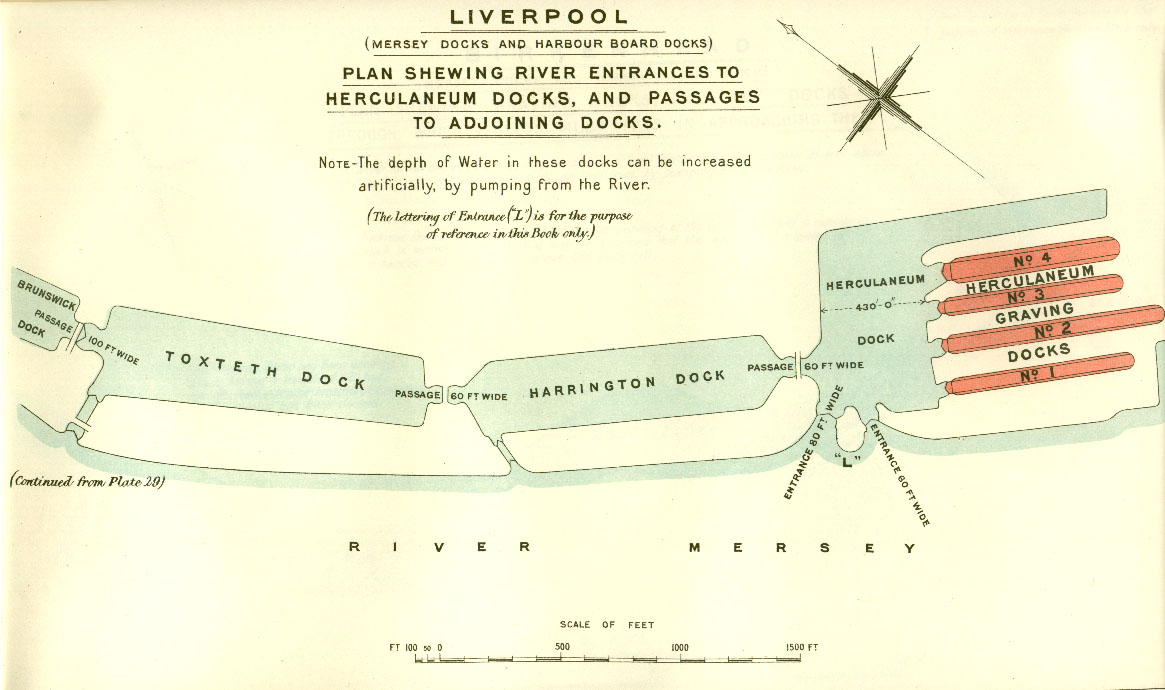
British Empire Dockyards and Ports, 1909

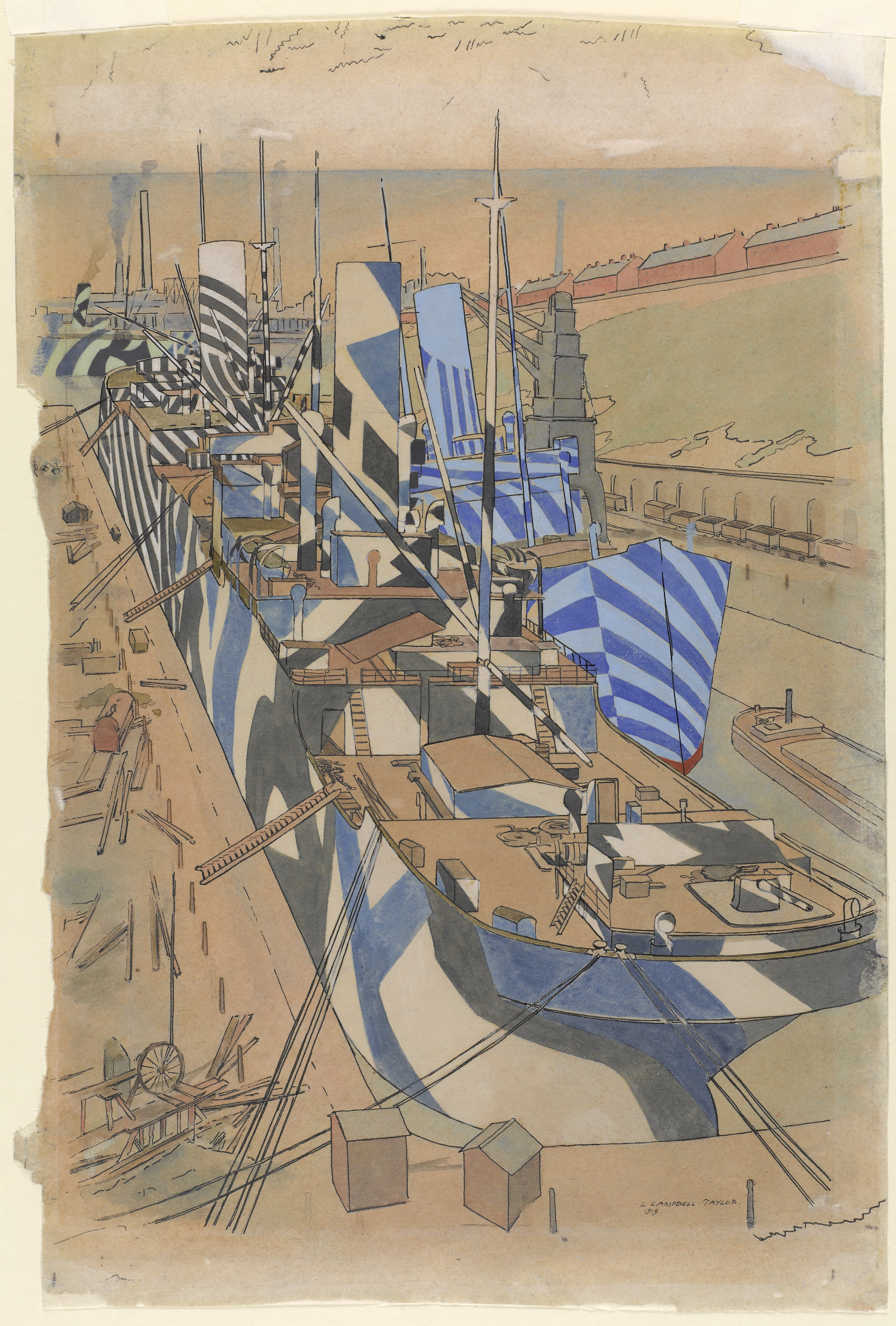
Herculaneum Dock with Dazzle painted merchant ships by Leonard Campbell Taylor

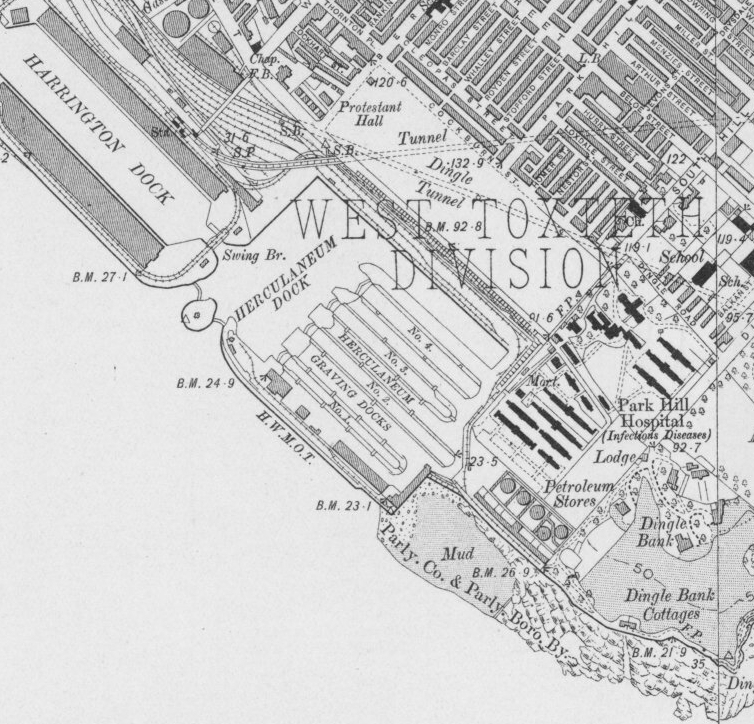
Map showing context of Herculaneum Dock

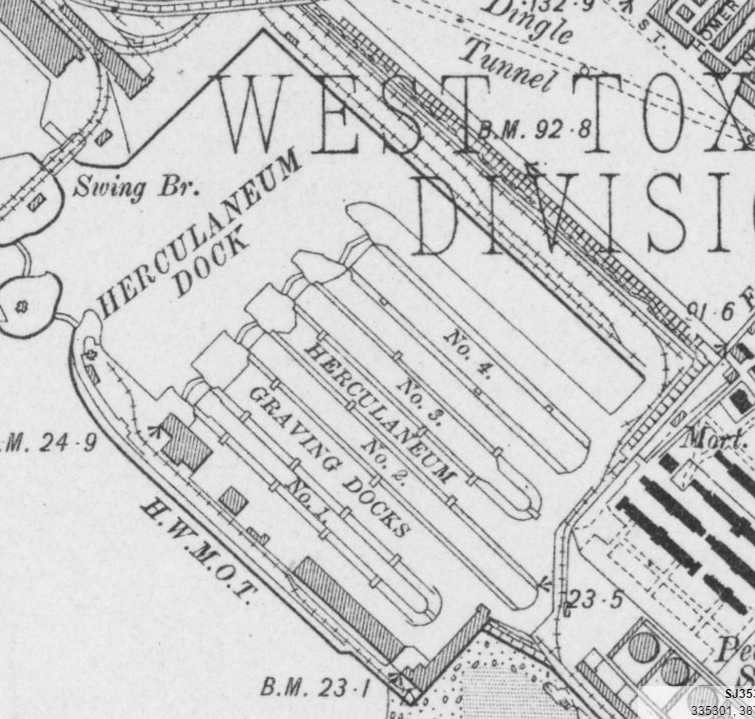
Map showing layout of Herculaneum Dock

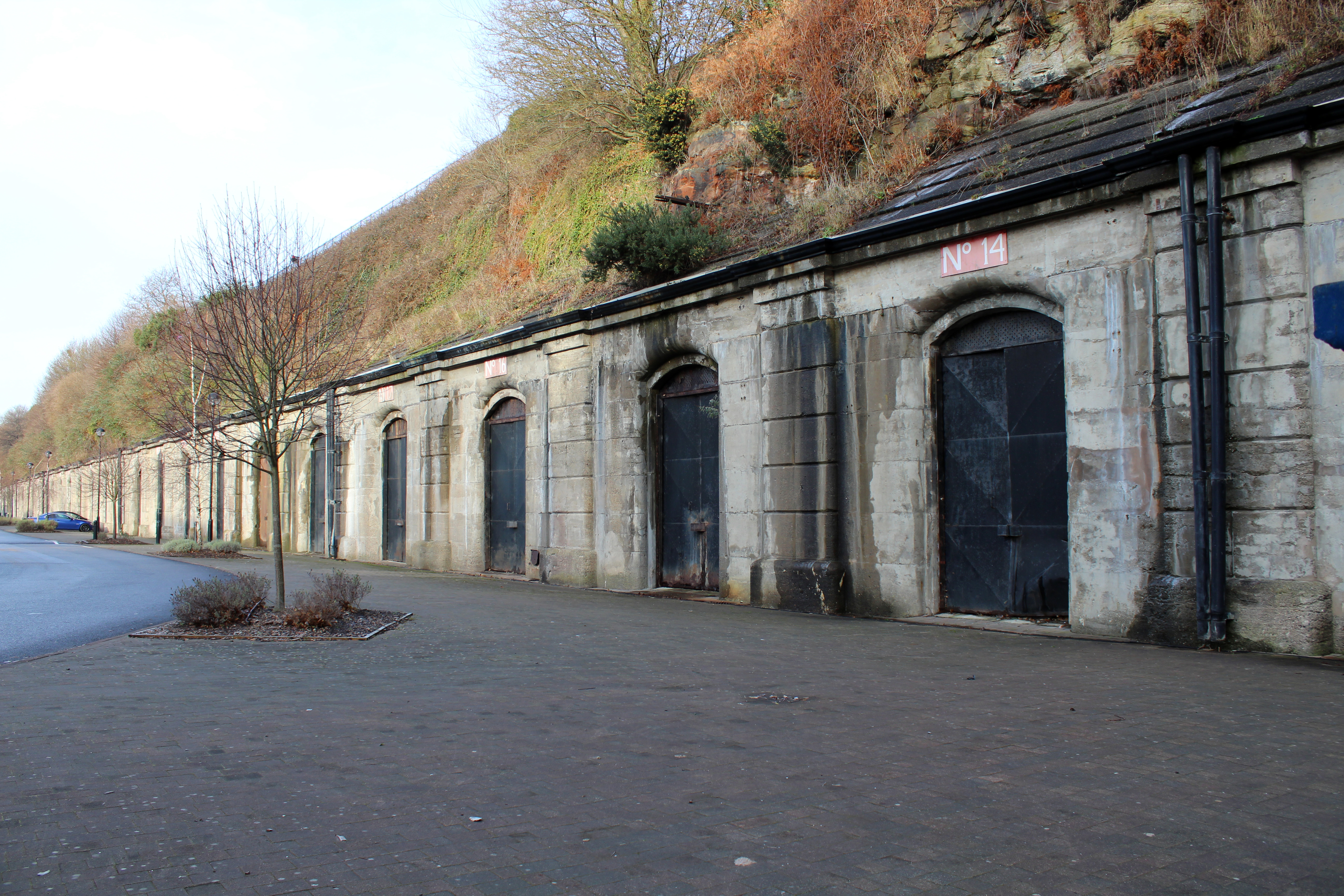
View north along the oil casemates, which are Grade II listed
