= Huskisson Dock railway station =

Disused railway station in England

Coordinates: 53.4301°N 2.9982°W

Huskisson Dock

General information
- Location: Liverpool, Liverpool; England
- Platforms: 2

Other information
- Status: Disused

History
- Post-grouping: Liverpool Overhead Railway

Key dates
- May 1896: Opened
- 30 December 1956: Closed completely
Location

Huskisson Dock was a railway station on the Liverpool Overhead Railway, adjacent to the dock of the same name. It was primarily used for access to the passenger liners, particularly those of Cunard and Ellerman.

It was opened in May 1896 and replaced nearby Sandon Dock station, which was closed at the same time.

The station closed, along with the rest of the line on 30 December 1956. No evidence of this station remains.

| Preceding station | Disused railways | Following station |
|---|---|---|
| Sandon Dock | Liverpool Overhead Railway | Canada Dock |
