= Canada Dock railway station (Liverpool Overhead Railway) =

Disused railway station in England

Canada Dock

General information
- Location: Liverpool, Liverpool, Merseyside; England
- Coordinates: 53.4348°N 2.9985°W
- Grid reference: SJ336937
- Platforms: 2

Other information
- Status: Disused

History
- Post-grouping: Liverpool Overhead Railway

Key dates
- 6 March 1893: Opened
- 30 Dec 1956: Closed completely
Location

Canada Dock station was on the Liverpool Overhead Railway, situated sixteen feet above street level between Canada Branch Dock No.1 dock to its west and the LNWR's Canada Dock goods station to the east; the LNWR's Canada Dock passenger station lay immediately east of the goods station.

The station was originally intended for transatlantic passengers, though the dock became a centre for timber trading. It was opened on 6 March 1893 by the Marquis of Salisbury. During the December 1940 Liverpool Blitz the station received heavy damage, including a direct hit to track close to the station.

The line and station closed on 30 December 1956, being demolished a year later. Nothing remains of the station.

Preceding station	Disused railways	Following station
Huskisson Dock	Liverpool Overhead Railway	Brocklebank Dock
