= History of Merseyrail =

The history of Merseyrail dates back to the 19th century with the original formation of the Mersey Railway in 1886. Merseyrail, created in 1963, became a single network in 1977 and was developed from lines previously owned by a number of companies. The 1970s Loop and Link project, consisting of two tunnels under Liverpool's city centre, was designed to increase capacity and improve service. When Merseyrail originally opened, there were 50 stations on the network; this has since expanded to almost 70, with plans for a network expansion, battery-powered trains, the reopening of lines, and the reuse of track and tunnels.

== First Mersey railways (19th century – 1930s) ==
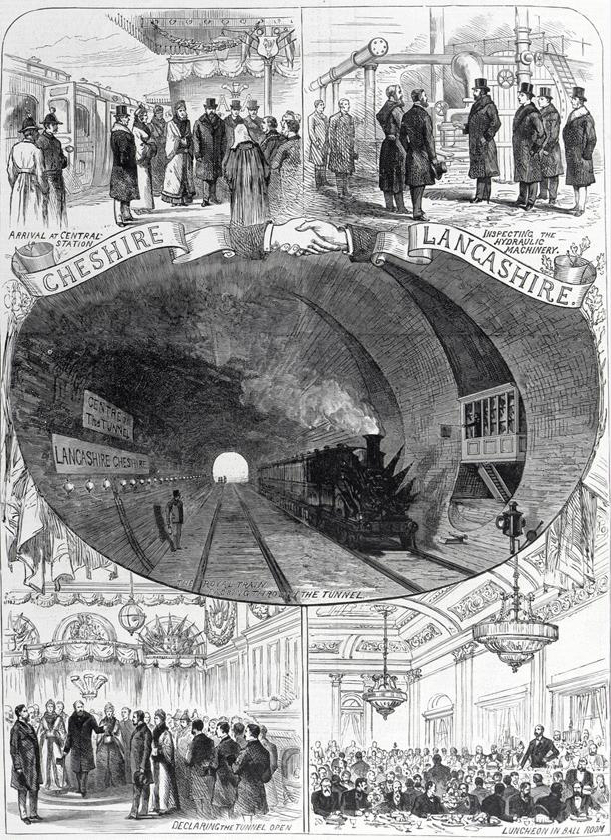
30 January 1886 Illustrated London News montage of the opening of the Mersey Railway Tunnel

The Merseyrail network is a merger of five former rail systems:

- The Mersey Railway (Liverpool Central to Rock Ferry, Birkenhead Park)
- The Cheshire Lines Committee railway (Liverpool Central to Hunts Cross section)
- The Lancashire and Yorkshire Railway (Liverpool Exchange to Kirkby, Ormskirk and Southport sections)
- The Wirral Railway (Birkenhead Park to New Brighton and West Kirby)
- The Birkenhead Joint Railway (Rock Ferry to Hooton and Chester section and the Ellesmere Port branch).

The central Mersey Railway opened and ran originally from Liverpool James Street to Green Lane through the 1886 Mersey Railway Tunnel, one of the world's first underwater railway tunnels. During the 1880s and 1890s, the network was expanded to include Liverpool Central (1890) and Birkenhead Park railway station (1888) to connect with the Wirral Railway. This led to the network's expansion to Rock Ferry railway station and the connection to the Chester Line in 1891.

In 1903, the Mersey Railway was electrified; this was the world's first full electrification of a steam railway. It was followed by the electrification of the Lancashire and Yorkshire Railway line from the Liverpool Exchange railway station to Southport railway station three years later. In 1937, electrification of the Wirral Railway lines to New Brighton railway station and West Kirby railway station enabled service into Liverpool via the Mersey Railway Tunnel.

== Creation of Merseyrail (1963–1977) ==
The early-1960s Beeching cuts triggered widespread railway closures, targeting key routes such as Liverpool–Southport, Liverpool–Wigan Wallgate, and the stations of Liverpool Exchange, Liverpool Central (High Level) and Birkenhead's Woodside station. The Liverpool City Council proposed a contrasting strategy in response, advocating the preservation of suburban services integrated into a new regional electrified rapid-transit network. This initiative aimed to link all lines via tunnels under Liverpool and Birkenhead, facilitating transportation across Merseyside. The Merseyside Area Land Use and Transportation Study (MALTS) supported this idea, leading to the establishment of Merseyrail when the city council's proposal was adopted. Merseyrail was conceived to streamline urban travel, ensuring convenient access to Liverpool Lime Street for long-haul routes by diverting local services underground in Liverpool's centre. The government opposed closure of the Liverpool-Southport and Liverpool-Wigan Wallgate lines but approved the shutdown of multiple stations, consolidating Liverpool's rail operations at Lime Street and curtailing the electrified section between Southport and Crossens in 1964.

The 1969 Merseyside Passenger Transport Authority (later Merseytravel) was tasked with overseeing local rail lines destined for inclusion in the newly-envisioned Merseyrail network. Initially, Liverpool operated separate entities for electric and diesel lines. Lines for the new Merseyrail system were categorised as the Northern Line (from Exchange and Central High Level), Wirral Line (from Central Low Level), and City Line (from Lime Street station). The 1973 Strategic Plan for the North West (SPNW) envisioned comprehensive electrification and integration of lines into Merseyrail by 1991, including the Outer Loop, Edge Hill Spur, and connections to St. Helens, Wigan, and Warrington.

Four construction projects were outlined to create the rapid-transit network:

- Loop Line: Extending the Wirral lines in a loop around Liverpool's city centre
- Link Line: A tunnel linking northern and southern lines under Liverpool's city centre to form the Northern Line
- Edge Hill Spur: Reusing the recently-closed 1830 Wapping Tunnel from Edge Hill to Central Station for the eastern lines' access to the underground city centre
- Outer Rail Loop: A comprehensive suburban loop around Liverpool, split into northern and southern segments, with plans for a six-platform underground station at Broad Green where the two loops and the St.Helens–Wigan line met.

The Loop Line and Link Line were completed, establishing the electrified Northern and Wirral Lines; the Edge Hill Spur and Outer Rail Loop projects were shelved, leaving the City Line isolated. This hindered its integration into Merseyrail, maintaining local service into Lime Street and using platforms needed for long-haul routes. Efforts to complete these projects faced political hurdles, and progress was only made on the electrification of Lime Street to the Manchester and Wigan lines in 2015; the line to Warrington retained diesel traction. Merseytravel initially sponsored Merseyrail branding in stations and liveries on local services; the latter ended with British Rail's privatisation, allowing operators to adopt individual corporate liveries.

== Loop and Link Project ==
The loop line (Wirral Line) and link line (Northern Line), built under Liverpool in 1977

The engineering works required to create the Northern and Wirral lines, known as the Loop and Link Project, consisted of two tunnels. The Loop was the Wirral Line tunnel, and the Link the Northern Line tunnel; both are under Liverpool's city centre. The main works were begun between 1972 and 1977. Another project, as the Edge Hill Spur, would have integrated the city lines into the city-centre underground network. This would have meshed the eastern section of the city into the underground city-centre section of the electric network, releasing platforms at the mainline Lime Street station for mid- to long-haul routes.

=== Loop line (Wirral line) ===
The Loop Line is a single-track loop tunnel under Liverpool's city centre, serving the Wirral line branches. It was built to provide greater capacity and a wider choice of destinations for Wirral Line users, which included the city centre's business and shopping districts and the mainline Lime Street station. The loop extension offered direct mainline-station access to Wirral residents after the decommissioning of the mainline Woodside terminal station in Birkenhead.

Trains from Wirral arriving via the original Mersey Railway tunnel enter the loop beneath Mann Island in Liverpool, continuing clockwise through James Street, Moorfields, Lime Street and Central and returning to the Wirral via the James Street station. The loop tunnel provided interchanges for Wirral line passengers to the Northern Line at Moorfields and Central stations. A burrowing junction was built at Birkenhead Hamilton Square station to increase the Wirral line's capacity by eliminating the flat junction west of the station; this included a new station tunnel at Hamilton Square for the lines to New Brighton and West Kirby.

=== Link line (Northern line) ===
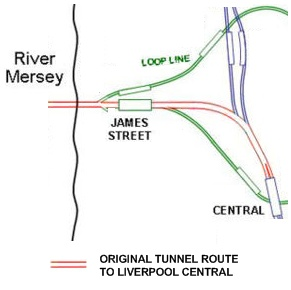
The original Mersey Railway tunnel, from James Street to Central station (in red), still exists. The Link line is in blue, and the Loop line in green.

The Link Tunnel was designed to connect Liverpool's north and south urban lines, creating a north-south Northern line. This line was the western section of a proposed double-track electrified suburban orbital line, the Outer Rail Loop, although budget cuts prevented eastern-section construction.

The Link Tunnel is a double-track tunnel connecting two lines: one running south from the city centre to Hunts Cross and another running north to Southport, with branches to Ormskirk and Kirkby. This line provides direct access from north and south Liverpool to the city centre's shopping and business districts via two underground stations, Liverpool Central and Moorfields, which connect to the Wirral line's Loop line.

Liverpool Central's Northern Line underground station was originally the Mersey Railway terminus at Central Low Level. A section of the original 1880s tunnel between James Street and Central stations was repurposed for the Link Tunnel. The remaining section, between Paradise Street Junction and Derby Square Junction, is a rolling-stock interchange between the Northern and Wirral lines and a reversing siding for Wirral line trains terminating at James Street when the Loop Tunnel is inactive. This interchange tunnel section is not used for passenger traffic.

A new track layout south of Liverpool Central eased connections between the former Mersey and Cheshire Lines railways, allowing the extension of the Northern line to Garston and (later) Hunts Cross. A tunnel was dug, connecting the high- and low-level tracks. Engineers also built short tunnels to prepare for a potential future project (the Edge Hill Spur) that would create a new connection without disrupting current service. The future junction would function similarly to the Hamilton Square burrowing junction and increase capacity.

== Expansion (1977–present) ==
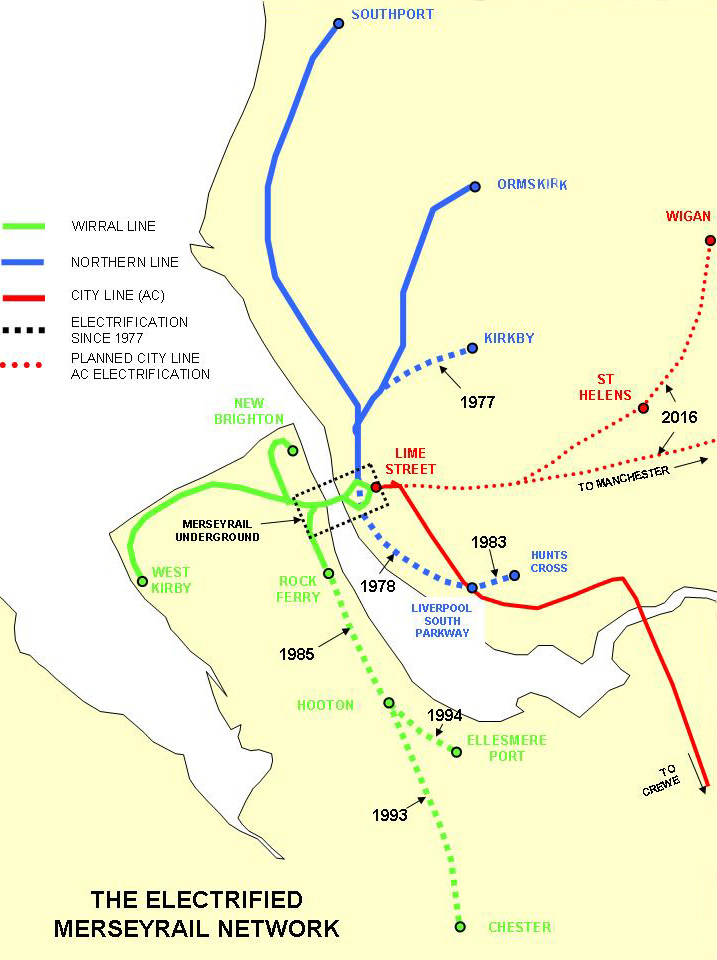
Electrification since 1977

Since the Loop and Link project concluded, Merseyrail has made expansions, electrification and new stations.

=== Early electrification (1977–1978) ===
On 30 April 1977, the Liverpool Exchange terminus was closed as part of the Link tunnel project to create Merseyrail's electrified north–south Northern line. The new tunnel under Liverpool's city centre enabled a continuous rail line, with the nearby Moorfields underground station replacing Liverpool Exchange.

In 1978, electrification of the line from Walton to Kirkby created a Northern-line branch terminus at Kirkby. This cut the northern Liverpool-to-Manchester route into two sections with different modes of traction: 750 V DC third-rail electric on the Merseyrail network and diesel on the Northern Rail network.

Merseyrail's Northern line was extended south that year from Liverpool Central, terminating at Garston instead of Gateacre (which had been abandoned in 1972). The new line linked the tunnel into Central High Level with the lower-level tunnel entering Central Low Level. This connection was originally envisaged when the Mersey Railway was extended to Central from James Street in the 1890s, with the two tunnels on the same alignment. A short extension to Hunts Cross in 1983 enabled passenger interchange between the Northern line, the Merseyrail City Line, and mainline service from Lime Street.

=== Rock Ferry to Hooton, Chester and Ellesmere Port (1985–1994) ===
Rock Ferry had been a terminus for Wirral-line service since the Mersey Railway was extended there from Green Lane in 1891. Passengers for the lines to Chester and Helsby would change trains at this station from the electric service to mainline steam and diesel services. Rock Ferry became a terminal for the Merseyrail Wirral line.

Hooton is a junction station where the line to Helsby via Ellesmere Port branches off the main Chester line. The line from Hooton to Chester was electrified in 1993, making Chester a terminus of the Wirral line.

=== Kirkby to Headbolt Lane ===
In 2023, Headbolt Lane replaced Kirkby as the terminus of the Kirkby-Headbolt Lane line. This network expansion is the UK's first passenger BEMU fleet; there is no electrification past Kirkby except batteries.

=== New stations ===
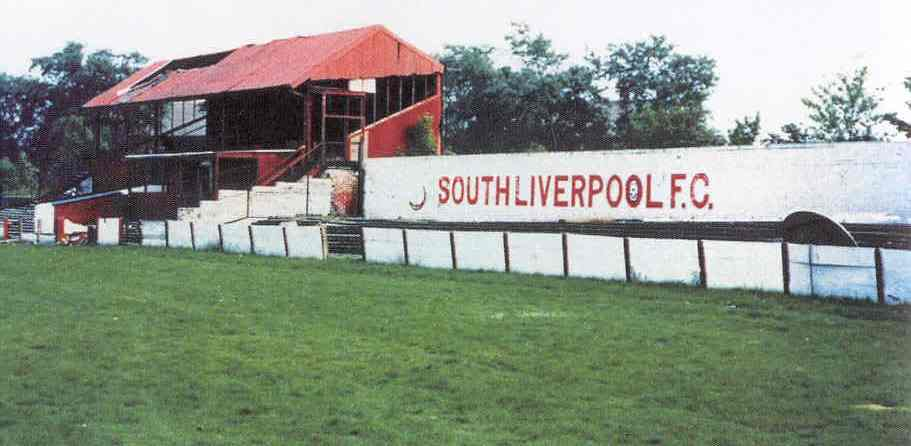
Former Holly Park Football ground in 2009, where Liverpool South Parkway Station now stands

- Bache opened in 1983 as a replacement for the closed Upton-by-Chester.
- Bromborough Rake, opened in 1985, was part of the electrification to Chester and Ellesmere Port.
- Overpool opened in 1988 as part of the electrification.
- Eastham Rake opened in 1995.
- Brunswick, opened after renovations in 1998 to fill the gap between St Michaels and the city.
- Conway Park opened in 1998 as an alternative station for passengers trying to get to Birkenhead town centre.
- Liverpool South Parkway opened in 2006 as an amalgamation of Allerton and Garston, and to serve Liverpool John Lennon Airport.
- Maghull North opened in 2017 to serve a housing estate under construction.
- Headbolt Lane opened in 2023 to better serve the local area and as a testing ground to ensure that plans for a railway link to Skelmersdale could proceed.
- Liverpool Baltic is planned to open in 2028.

== Future plans ==
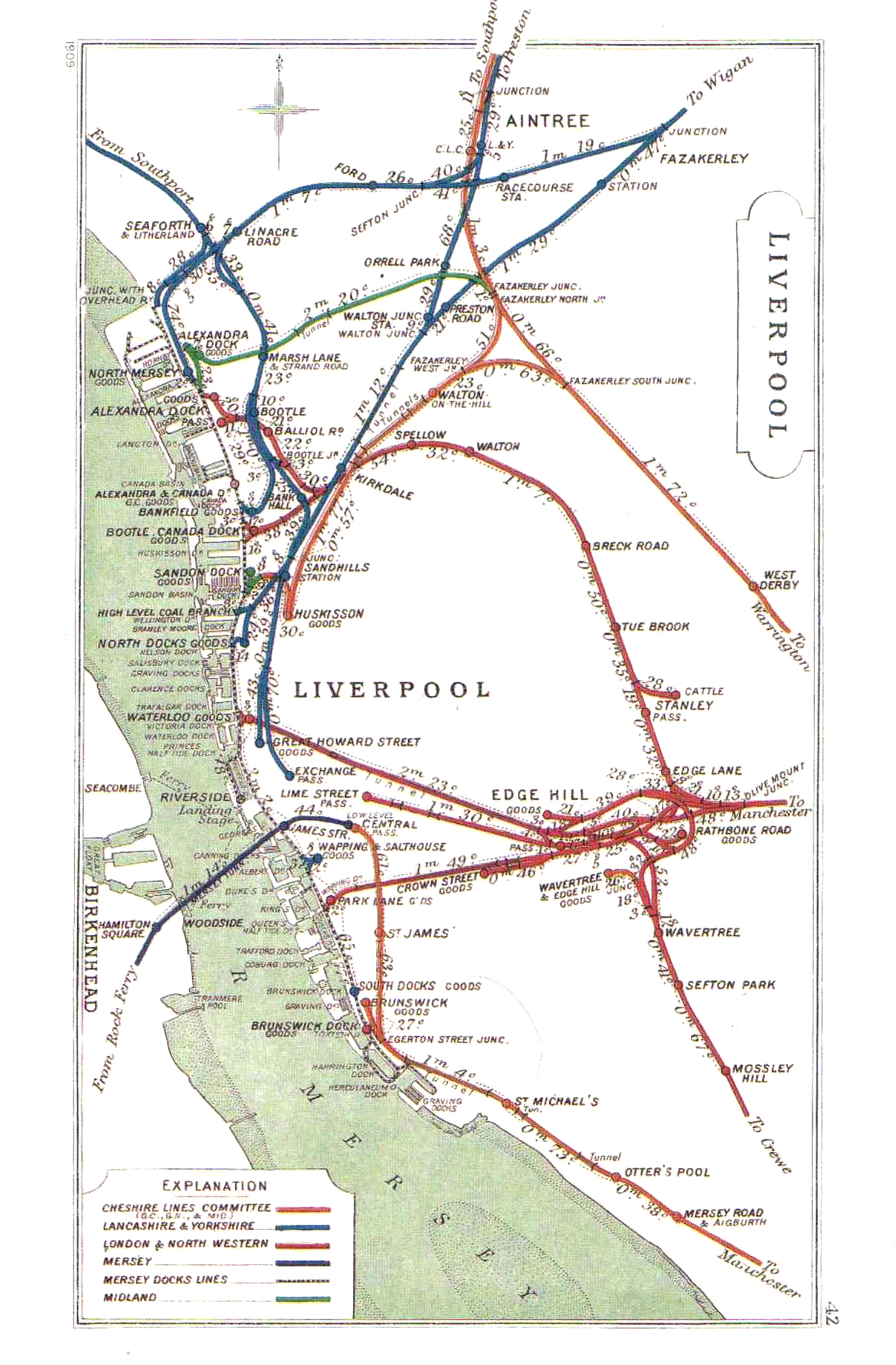
1909 map of rail lines around Liverpool

Since 2014, plans have existed to use bi-modal trains to expand the Merseyrail along existing former lines or lines with significant links to Merseyside. The plans were expedited by the introduction of Class 777, with provisions for batteries or pantographs on the units. A 2020 rail-strategy report included plans to increase rail connectivity to Shotton and Wrexham, Skelmersdale and Wigan, and Burscough Junction and (possibly) Preston.

=== Use of battery powered trains ===
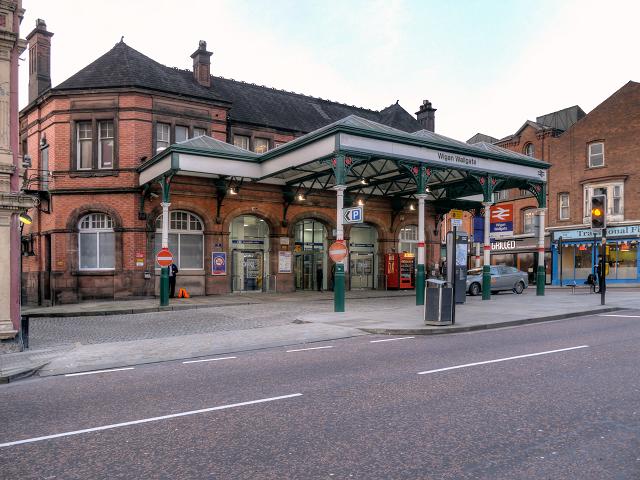
Wigan Wallgate station

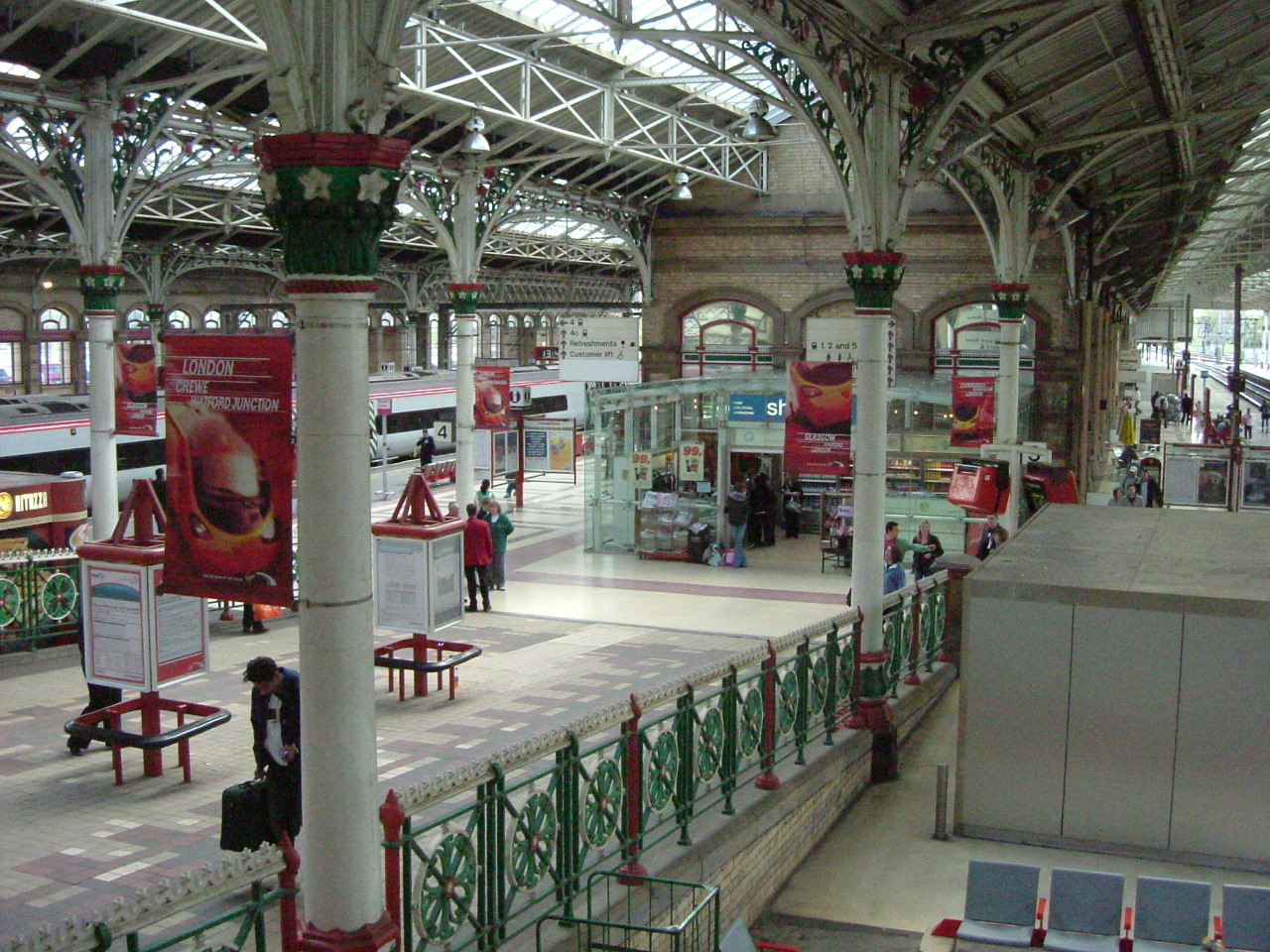
Preston station

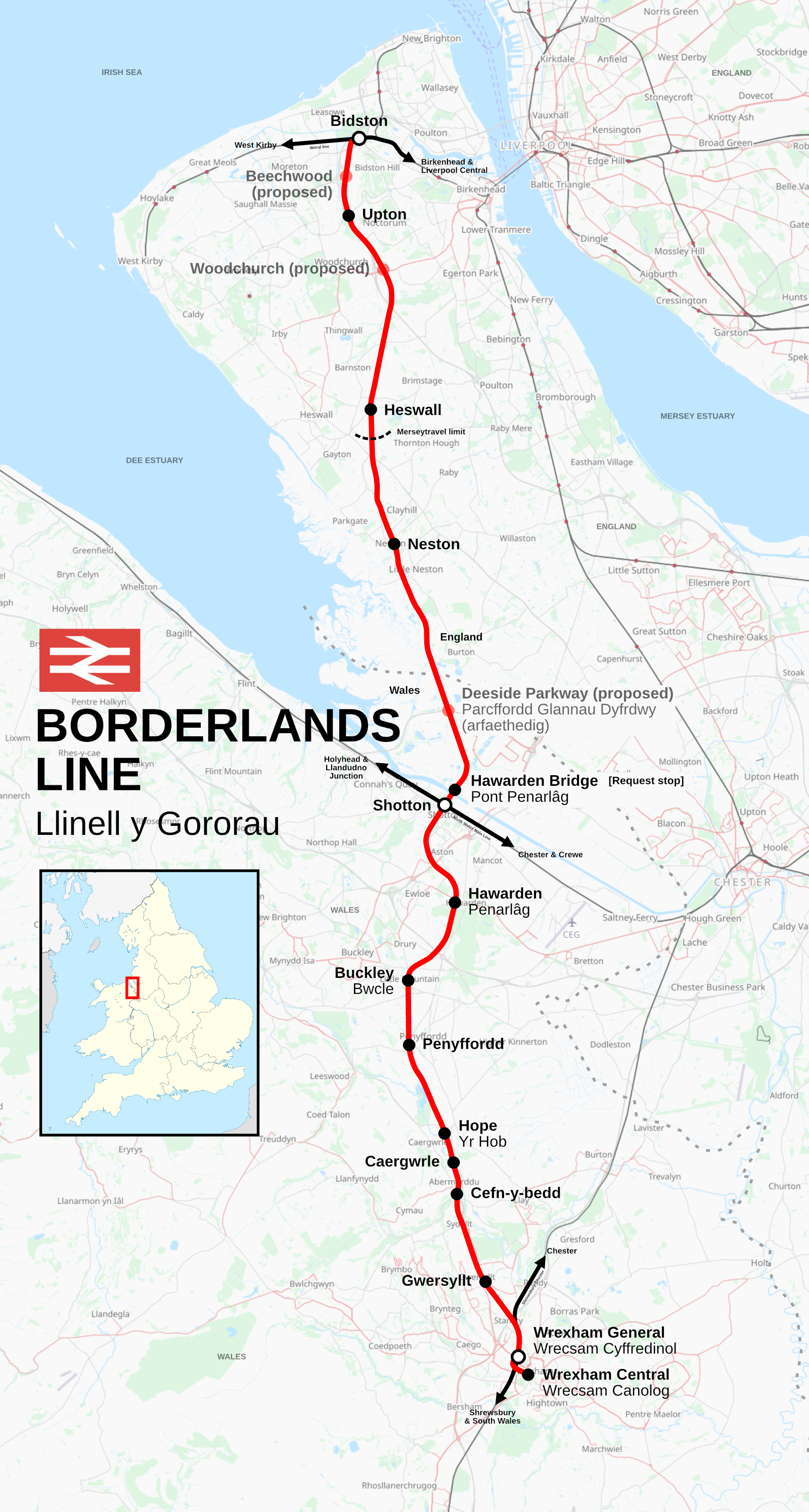
Liverpool City Region mayor Steve Rotheram hopes to expand Merseyrail to Runcorn and Warrington via Chester with HS2 and Northern Powerhouse Rail interchanges.

Battery technology has been discussed to expand the Merseyrail network by using existing track, re-using old track, or laying new track. Plans include:

- Ellesmere Port to Helsby: According to page 37 of the October 2017 Liverpool City Region Combined Authority Long Term Rail Strategy document, a trial of new Merseyrail battery trains would be undertaken to incorporate the 5.2-mile (8.4 km) stretch of track from Ellesmere Port to Helsby interchange station into the Merseyrail network. A successful outcome might make Helsby a terminals on the Wirral line (replacing Ellesmere Port), with the Stanlow and Thornton and Ince and Elton stations brought into the network.
- Ormskirk to Preston: The same page of the above-mentioned document suggested the incorporation of Preston into Merseyrail by extending its Northern line over 15 miles (24 km) from Ormskirk to the Preston interchange station to make Preston a Northern line terminal, with the Burscough Junction, Rufford and Croston stations added to the network. The document read, "The potential use of battery powered Merseyrail units may improve the business case. This will be reviewed after the Merseyrail units have been tested for battery operation in 2020."
- Headbolt Lane to Wigan or Skelmersdale: Extending the Northern line to Wigan Wallgate has been a long-term goal. Network Rail identified this extension as a route that would benefit from electrification and enable new patterns of passenger service. The Electrification Task Force prioritised the Kirkby to Salford Crescent electrification in 2015. Hybrid battery trains make extending to Wigan feasible without costly electrification, using battery power from Headbolt Lane to Wigan. There are also plans to add to the already existing line, in the form of re-opening Skelmersdale branch and running trains to Skelmersdale.
- Bidston to Wrexham: The line, currently run by Transport for Wales, has been in battery trials with Class 230 battery units. However, Metro Mayor Steve Rotheram, has suggested Merseyrail Class 777 battery units could take over this line, and increase services between Liverpool and Wrexham.
- Hunts Cross to Warrington: The 1973 Strategic Plan for the North West (SPNW) envisaged that the Liverpool-to-Warrington line would be electrified and integrated into Merseyrail's Northern line by 1991, making Warrington Central a terminus. In March 2015, the electrification task force placed electrifying the line from Liverpool to Manchester via Warrington Central in its Tier 1 priority category. The Liverpool City Region's Long Term Rail Strategy hopes to extend the network to Warrington, introducing Class 777 trains.
- Southport to Wigan: This line has been identified by Network Rail as a route where electrification in conjunction with extension of electrification from Ormskirk to Preston and reinstatement of the Burscough Curves would enable new patterns of passenger service to operate. In March 2015, the electrification task force placed electrification of the line from Southport to Salford Crescent via Wigan in its Tier 1 priority category.

=== Reopening lines and track ===
==== Burscough Curves ====
The Burscough Curves were short rail chords linking the Ormskirk-Preston line with the Manchester-Southport line, enabling direct travel from Ormskirk and Preston to Southport. Passenger service ended in 1962, and the tracks were removed. Reinstating the curves would enable direct Preston-Southport and Ormskirk-Southport service (offering an alternative Liverpool-Southport route via Ormskirk), and Network Rail has recommended development of a strategy to do so. During a 27 April 2011 parliamentary debate, the transport minister expressed interest in discussing the curves' reinstatement with former Southport MP John Pugh.

The new Class 777 Merseyrail trains, capable of battery operation, may be considered for use on the Burscough Curves. Merseytravel's long-term strategy puts the opening of the curves in Network Rail's CP7 control period.

==== Edge Hill to Bootle ====
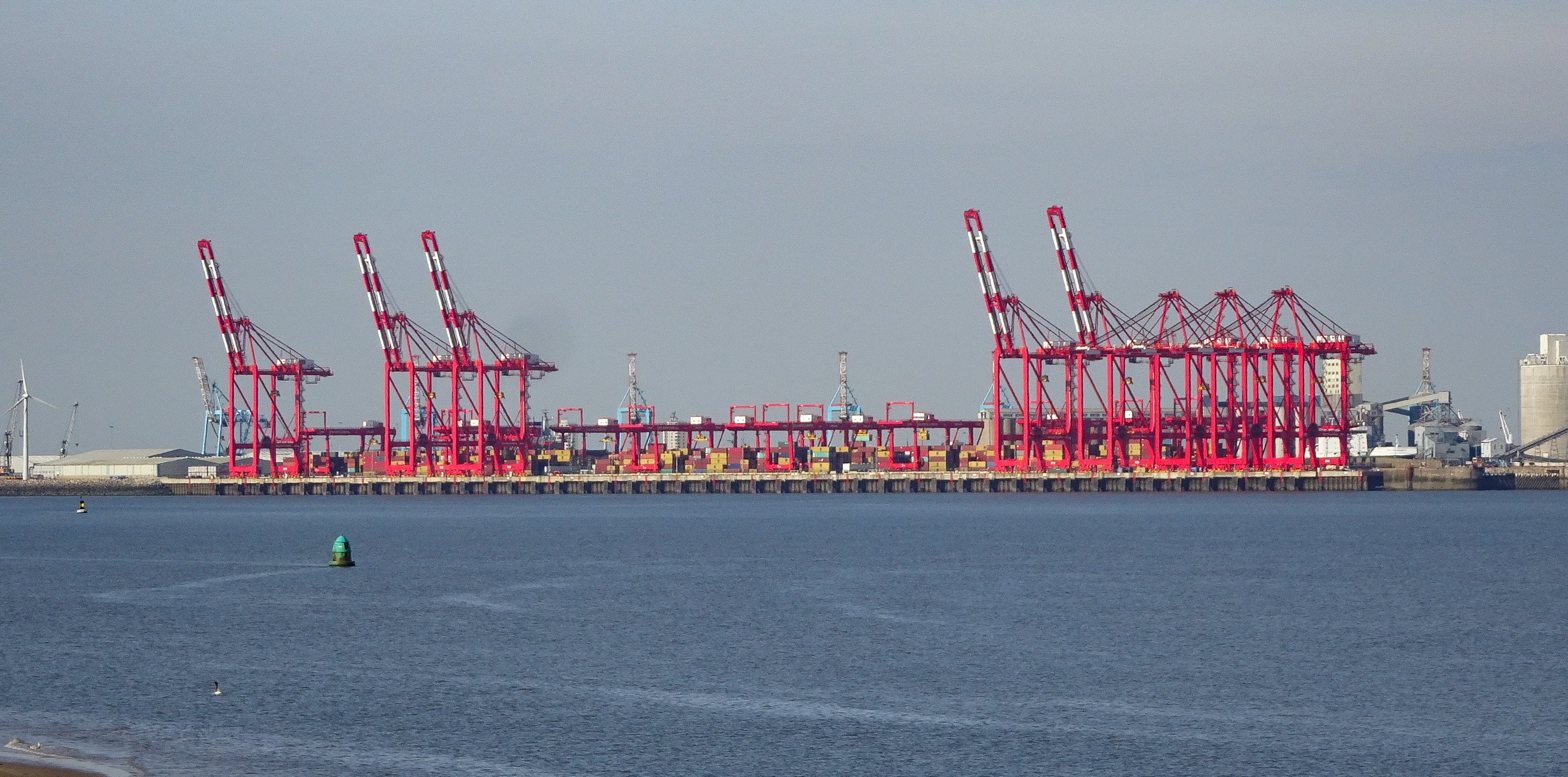
Liverpool2 Container terminal extension, served by the Bootle Branch

The Canada Dock Branch, also known as the Bootle Branch, is an unelectrified line running from Edge Hill Junction in east Liverpool on a curve to the container terminal to the north. Passenger trains were withdrawn in 1977, but it remains in use for freight to the Seaforth Container Terminal. Proposals have been made to electrify and reopen the line for passengers, potentially reopening stations such as Spellow, Walton & Anfield, Breck Road, Tuebrook, Stanley, and Edge Lane.

Network Rail's March 2009 Route Utilisation Strategy for Merseyside found that the benefits of new infrastructure on the Canada Dock Branch did not justify the investment. However, the Department for Transport's July 2009 rail-electrification document stated that the route to Liverpool Docks would be electrified with overhead wires. The document noted that electrifying this route would enable electric freight transport, creating an alternative access to Liverpool docks for electrically-powered trains. It was also expected to enhance electrified connectivity to the planned freight terminal at Parkside, near Newton-le-Willows.

Initial phases of electrification scheduled until 2016 did not list the line. Local residents campaigned for increased rail transport of containers to ease road congestion and pollution, which could increase rail traffic. The Liverpool City Region Combined Authority's October 2017 Long Term Rail Strategy outlined a proposal to introduce passenger service on the Bootle Branch to Lime Street, noting on page 37: "An initial study is required to understand fully the freight requirements for the line and what the realistic potential for operating passenger services over the line is." It was announced in December 2019 that the Liverpool City Council had commissioned a feasibility study to explore reopening the line to passenger traffic.

==== North Mersey Branch ====
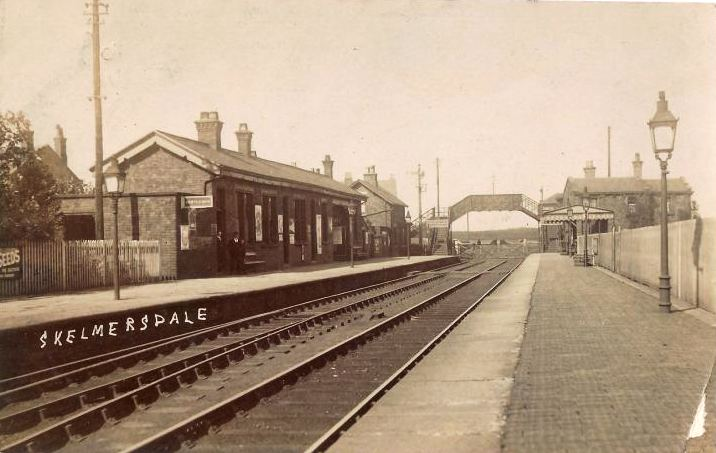
The original, demolished Skelmersdale station, whose track was removed in 1963

The North Mersey Branch, from Bootle to Aintree, is currently used by engineering trains accessing Merseyrail tracks. Merseytravel intends to eventually reopen and electrify the line. The Merseyside Route Utilisation Strategy (RUS) said that reopening the line was not currently recommended, although future development and regeneration could increase demand for the service. The RUS noted that any implementation must ensure current and future freight needs, and there may be long-term potential in using other infrastructure (such as the unused Wapping and Waterloo tunnels) for new travel opportunities.

==== Outer Rail Loop ====
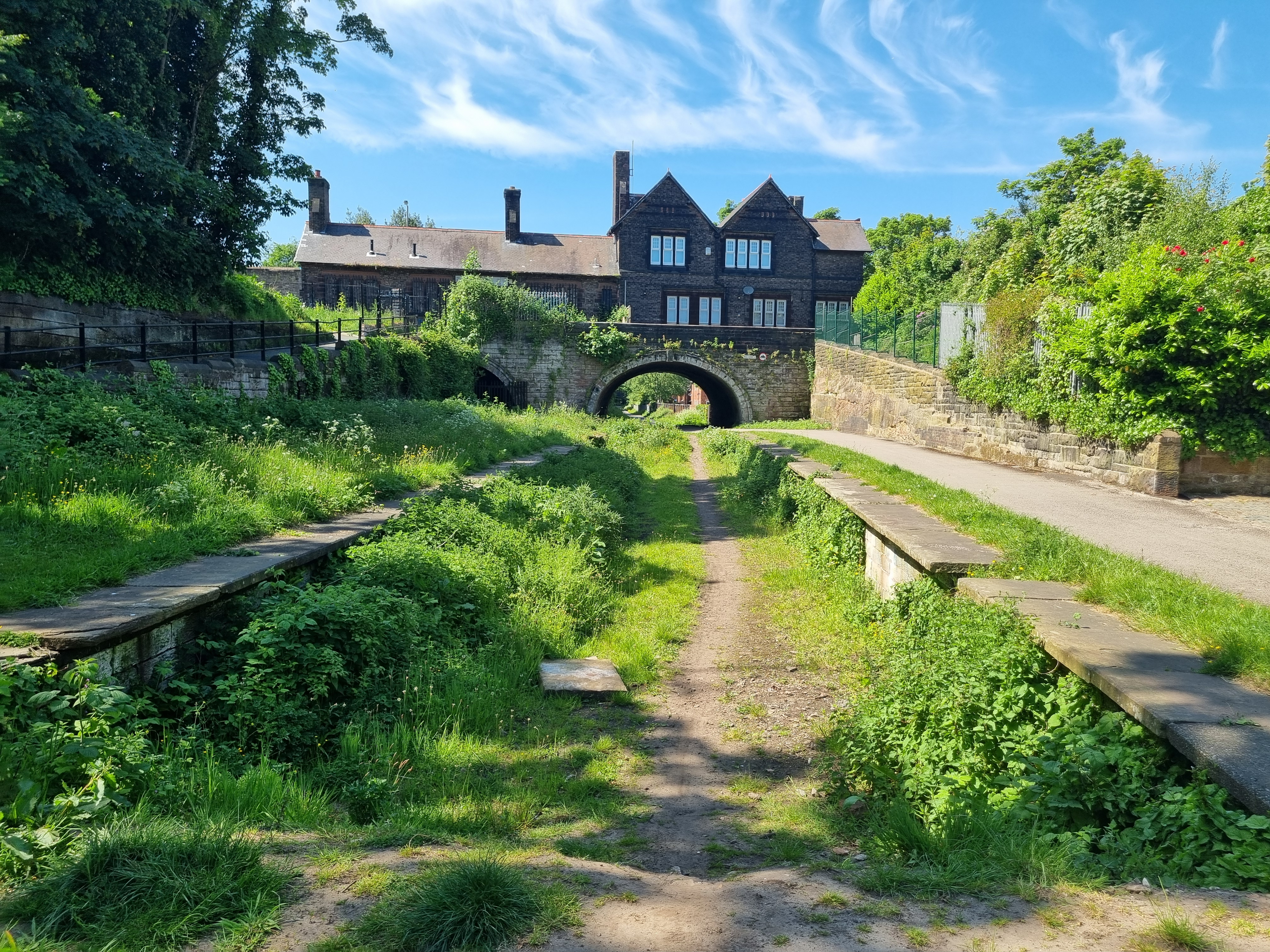
The West Derby station on the North Liverpool Extension, planned as part of the Outer Loop

The Orbital Outer Rail Loop, designed to circle the outer edges of Liverpool with existing rail lines, was part of the original 1970s Merseyrail plans. Liverpool's semi-circular layout has the city centre on its western edge, on the River Mersey. The loop's western section, paralleling the river through the city centre, was the only part completed and is part of the Northern line.

The concept of using the former Cheshire Lines Committee's North Liverpool Extension Line through the eastern suburbs dated back to before World War II. The proposal was a belt line using the former Liverpool Overhead Railway, which ran along the river front, as its western section. The idea evolved during the 1960s into the Outer Rail Loop, a rapid-transit line combining new and existing electrified lines with a tunnel under the city centre. This would have allowed passengers from eastern and southern mainline routes to transfer at two parkway interchange stations, including Liverpool South Parkway (which opened three decades after the original proposal). Passengers would be able to reach the suburbs without entering the city centre, easing congestion at the Lime Street station.

The Outer Loop was intended to connect eastern suburbs such as Gateacre, Childwall, Broad Green, Knotty Ash, West Derby, Clubmoor, and Walton with the city centre. The final plan had two sub-loops for the northern and southern suburbs, providing direct city-centre access from the east. The eastern section was cancelled in the late 1970s due to delays, cost overruns, and political opposition, and only the western section was completed. The eastern section is the Liverpool Loop Country Park, a suburban walking and cycling trail.

The project was abandoned by Merseytravel in the 1980s; construction of a large bridge taking the M62 motorway over the eastern section and header tunnels south of Liverpool Central station were expensive. The route is still largely intact (including bridges), although the eastern section forms the Liverpool Loop Country Park.

Key components of the loop were:

- West Section: Existing Northern Line from Sandhills (later Aintree) to Hunts Cross, including the costly Link Line tunnel under the city centre.
- East Section: Former CLC North Liverpool Extension Line from Hunts Cross to Aintree, now the Liverpool Loop Country Park.
- North Section: Originally from Walton to Kirkdale, later from Aintree to Bootle via the North Mersey Branch; the latter is used for maintenance trains.
- Central Section: From Central station to Broad Green, dividing the loop into north and south sub-loops, with the proposed Edge Hill Spur. A major junction would have been formed with the eastern section of the Outer Loop, with a six-platform underground station (named Rocket) under the car park of the Rocket pub near the M62-Queens Drive intersection.

The loop would have used a double track with a 750 V DC third-rail system. The route remains safeguarded, with occasional calls to revive parts of it (such as the stretch from Hunts Cross to Gateacre). Strategy documents have mentioned reopening the North Mersey Branch for passenger service between Bootle and Aintree, with stations serving Ford and Girobank.

==== Edge Hill Spur (reusing tunnels) ====
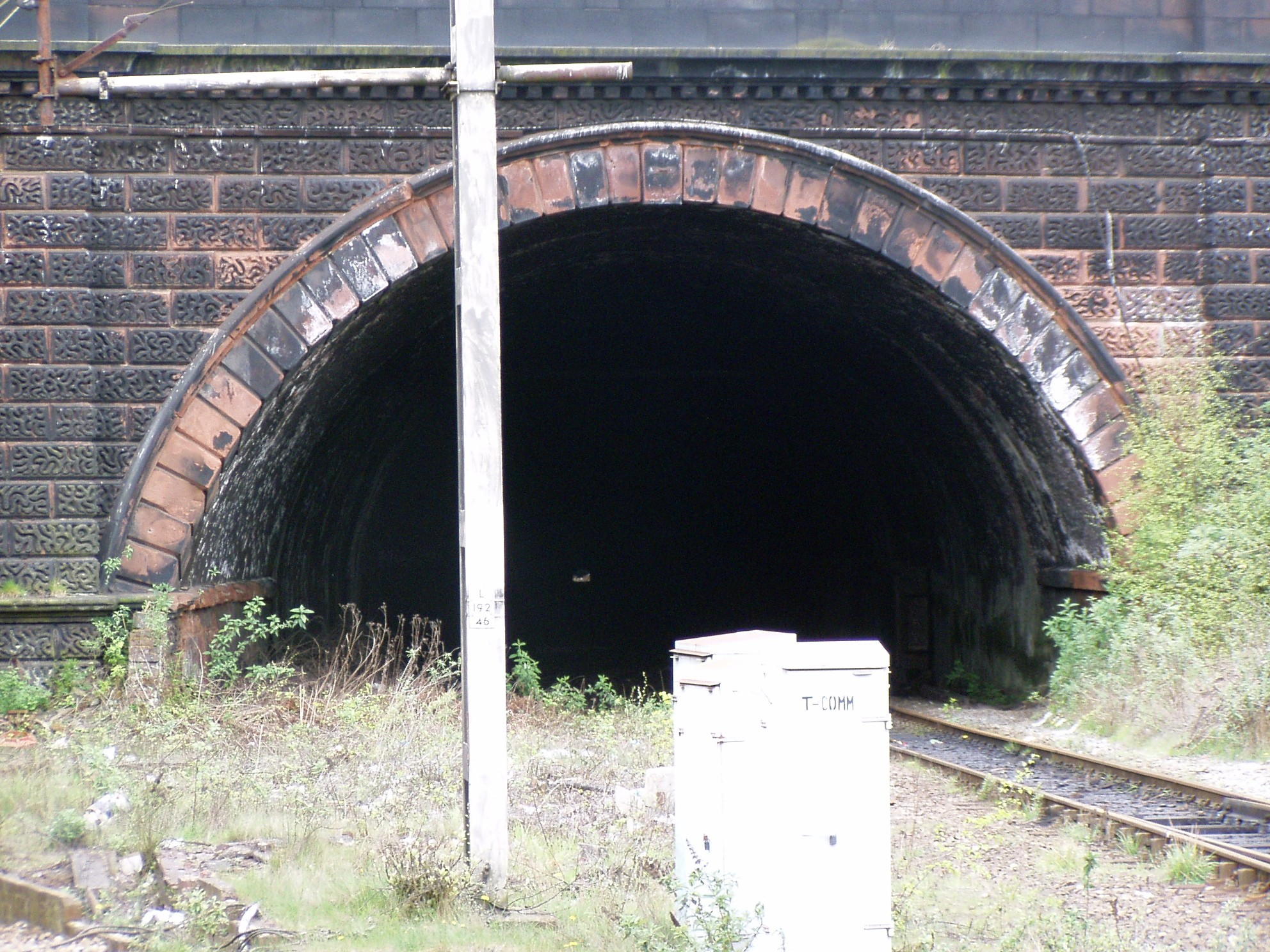
Victoria/Waterloo Tunnel portal at the Edge Hill station. The tunnel is an option for the Edge Hill Spur.

During the 1960s and early 1970s, the Edge Hill Spur was proposed to link Liverpool's eastern suburbs with the central underground section of Merseyrail. The plan involved extending the network from Liverpool Central to Edge Hill with existing freight tunnels. Although the scheme was dropped, construction of junctions and two header tunnels south of Liverpool Central was completed during Northern Line tunnel construction to allow future development of the spur.

The spur would connect the City Line branches from eastern Liverpool and the electrified Merseyrail network, enhancing integration and connectivity. By diverting local trains from the east underground, it would have freed platform space at Lime Street station for mid-and long-haul routes. The initial plan was to reuse the 1829 Wapping freight tunnel, creating two single-track tunnels branching off the Northern line at Liverpool Central South Junction. This would have provided access to Edge Hill via the Cavendish cutting, which was built for the 1830 Liverpool and Manchester Railway. A flyover east of the Edge Hill station would have connected to the City Line, but this flyover has been demolished.

In the early 1970s, an alternative route was adopted. The revised plan included a new underground station near Liverpool University, behind the Student Union building in Mount Pleasant. The new tunnels would curve north, passing beneath the mainline Lime Street station approach and accessing Edge Hill via the Waterloo/Victoria Tunnel. The route would emerge at Edge Hill on the north side of the main lines, eliminating the need for a flyover.

Although the 1975 Merseyside Metropolitan Railway Act authorised this line, construction was postponed due to financial cutbacks and political opposition (which also halted the Outer Rail Loop project). Eastern part of Liverpool has had reduced connectivity ever since. After the 2006 collapse of the Merseytram scheme, proposals renewed to revive the spur and the route remains safeguarded in MerseyTravel's 30-year plan.

In 2016, Liverpool mayor Joe Anderson proposed resurrecting the Edge Hill Spur with a new station at Paddington Village as part of the city's Knowledge Quarter expansion. A feasibility study commissioned in May 2016 found that the Wapping Tunnel, flooding in some places, was in good condition and reopening it was possible after remedial work.
