= Capenhurst railway station =

Railway station on the Chester branch of the Wirral line in England

Capenhurst
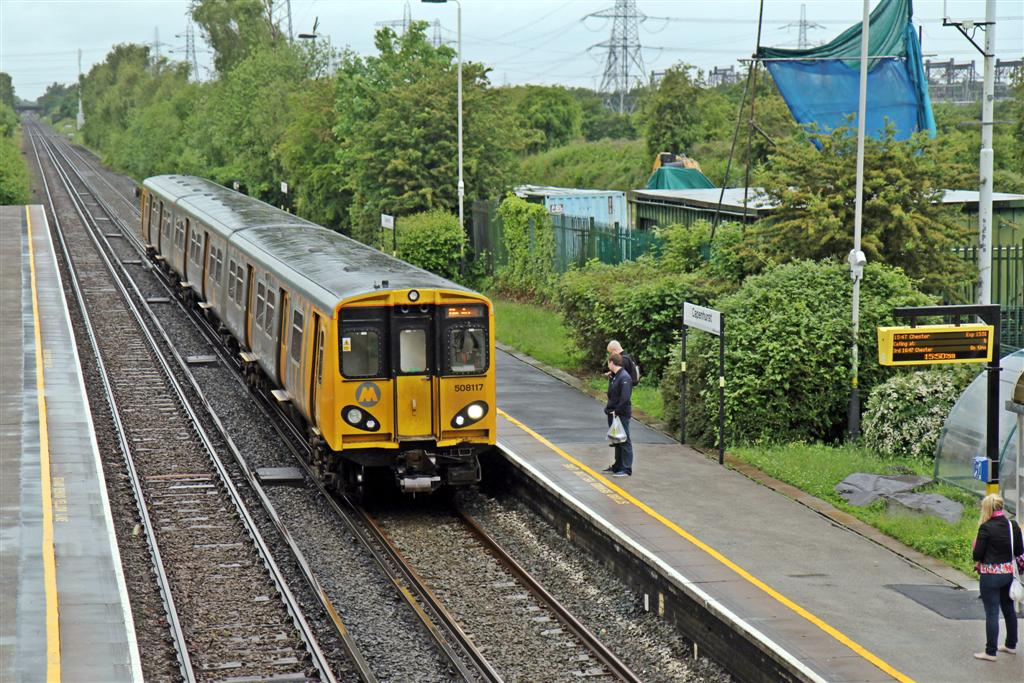

General information
- Location: Capenhurst, Cheshire West and Chester; England
- Coordinates: 53.260°N 2.942°W
- Grid reference: SJ372740
- Manager: Merseyrail
- Transit authority: Merseytravel
- Platforms: 2

Other information
- Station code: CPU
- Fare zone: G1/G2
- Classification: DfT category F2

Passengers
- 2021/22: ▲0.141 million
- 2022/23: ▲0.171 million
- 2023/24: ▲0.185 million
- 2024/25: ▲0.206 million
- 2025/26: ▲0.215 million
Location
Notes
- Passenger statistics from the Office of Rail and Road

Capenhurst railway station serves the village of Capenhurst and its substantial industrial facilities, in Cheshire, England. It also serves outer suburbs of Ellesmere Port. On the former GWR main line from London Paddington to Birkenhead Woodside it is now on the Wirral Line of the Merseyrail network, 5 1/4 miles (8.4 km) north of Chester.

== Facilities ==
The station has platform CCTV, a 24-space car park and a cycle rack with 10 spaces as well as secure cycle storage for 20 cycles. Each platform has a waiting shelter with seating. There are departure and arrival screens, on the platform, for passenger information. There is access, to each platform, for passengers with wheelchairs or prams. However, cross-platform access, within the station, is by staircase only.

Capenhurst is one of four stations on the Merseyrail network that is unstaffed, the others being Bache, Little Sutton and Overpool. Passengers must purchase tickets from the Ticket Vending Machine located on the Chester-bound platform; the machine can issue tickets to any destination on the rail network. Passengers failing to purchase a ticket will be liable for a Penalty Fare if they board a Merseyrail service without obtaining a valid ticket. This station became part of the Merseyrail Penalty Fares Area on 15 June 2009.

== Services ==
Trains between Chester and Liverpool call at Capenhurst every 30 minutes every day (including Sunday). The quarter-hourly service on the Chester line does not benefit Capenhurst since alternate trains run through the station non-stop between Hooton and Bache in each direction. These services are all provided by Merseyrail's fleet of Class 777 EMUs.

== Gallery ==
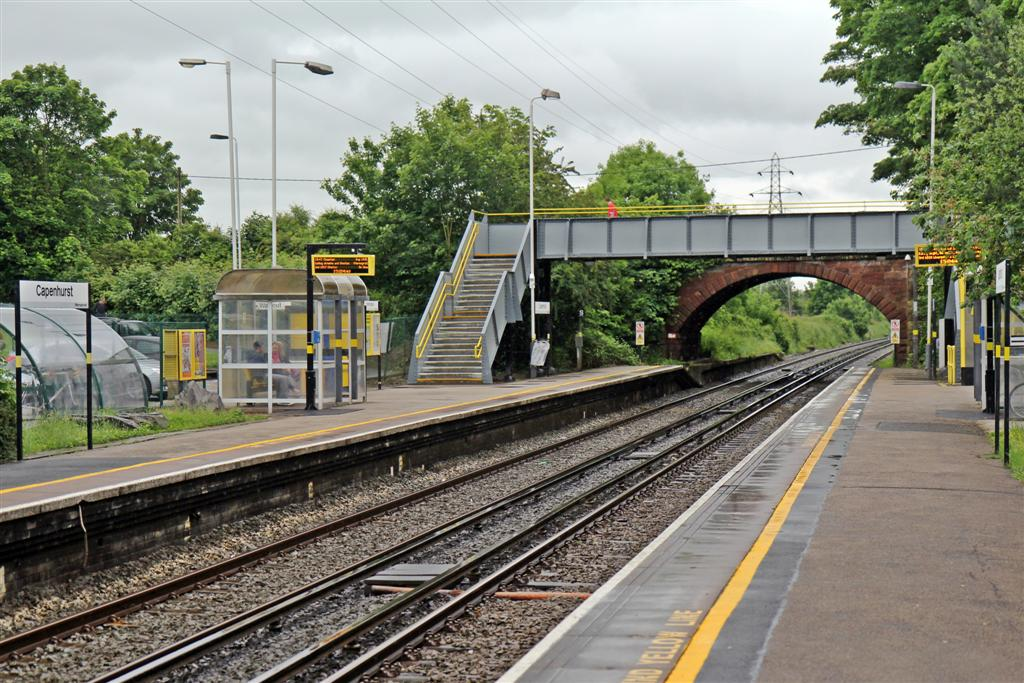
The foot and road bridges.

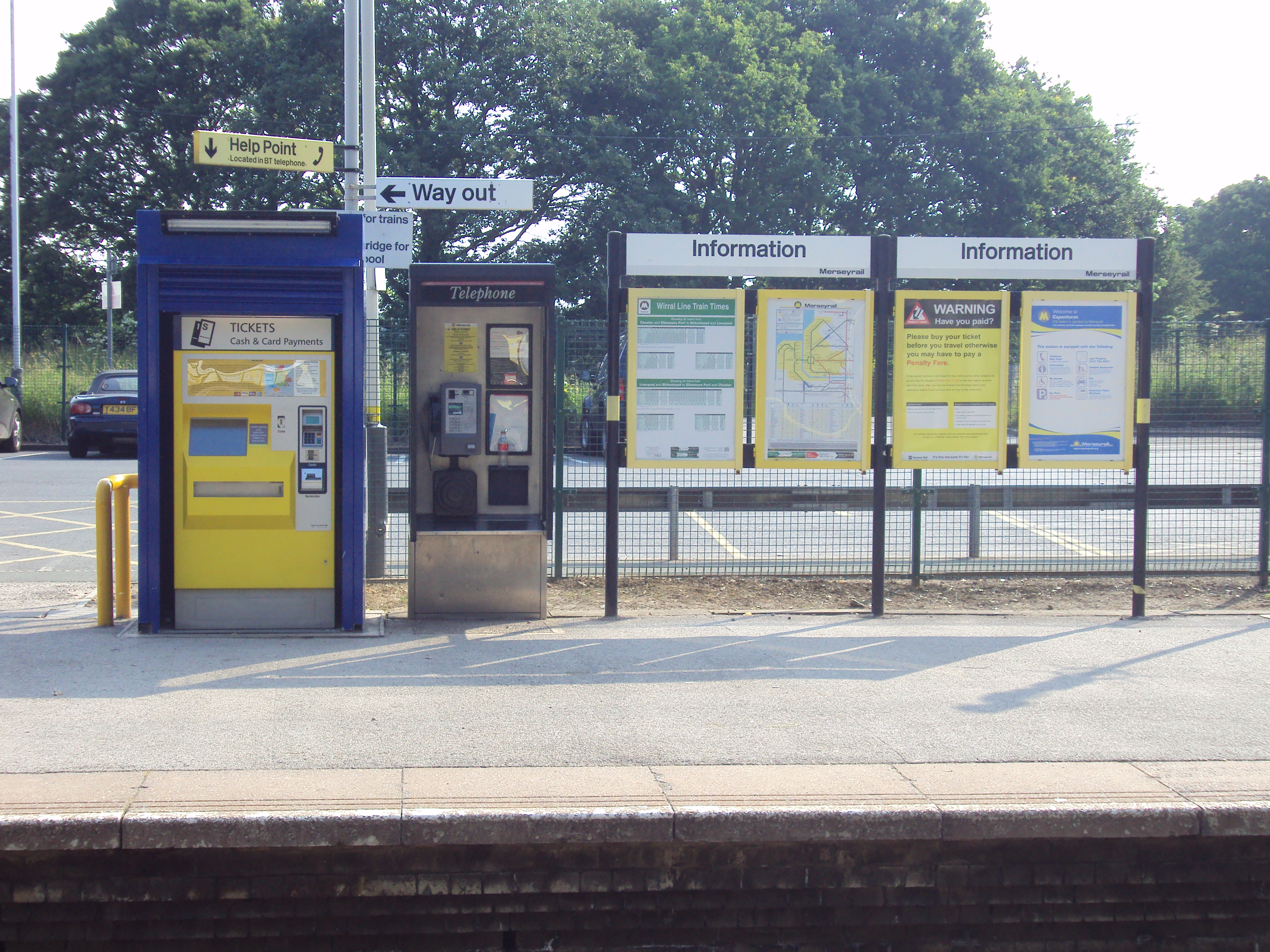
The ticket machine and information boards.

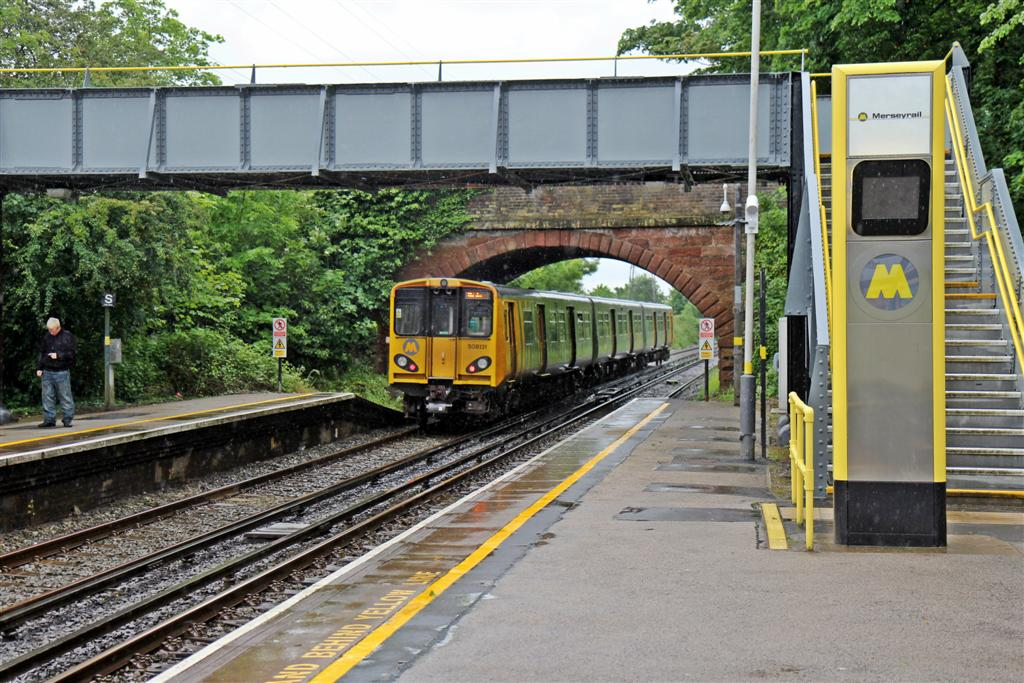
A Merseyrail Class 508 departs for Chester.

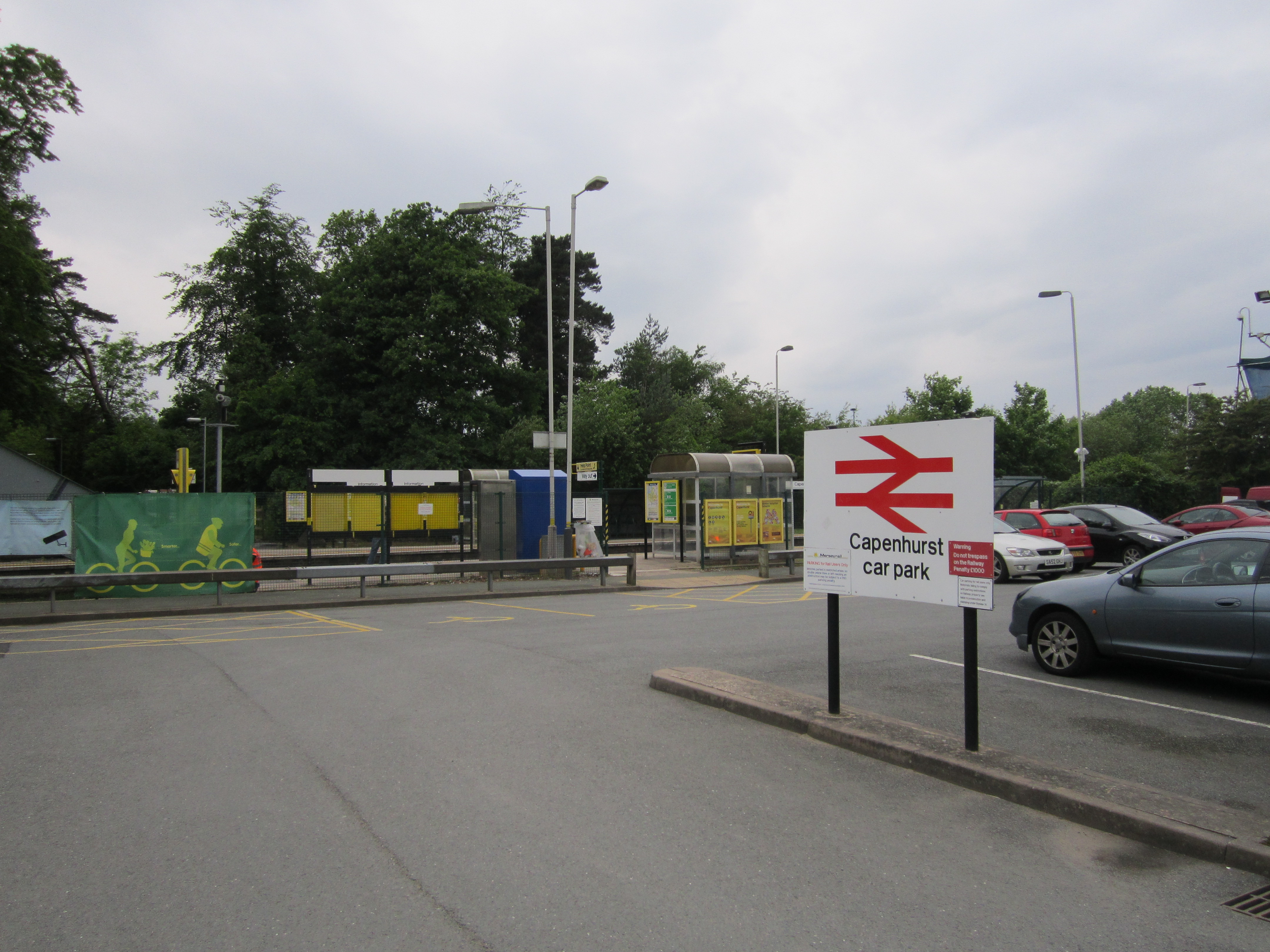
The main entrance.

Preceding station	National Rail	Following station
Bache towards Chester	Merseyrail; Wirral Line; Chester Branch	Hooton towards Liverpool Central
	Historical railways	
Mollington; Line open, station closed	GWR & LNWR; Chester and Birkenhead Railway	Ledsham; Line open, station closed
