= Little Sutton railway station =

Railway station on the Ellesmere Port branch of the Wirral line in England

Little Sutton
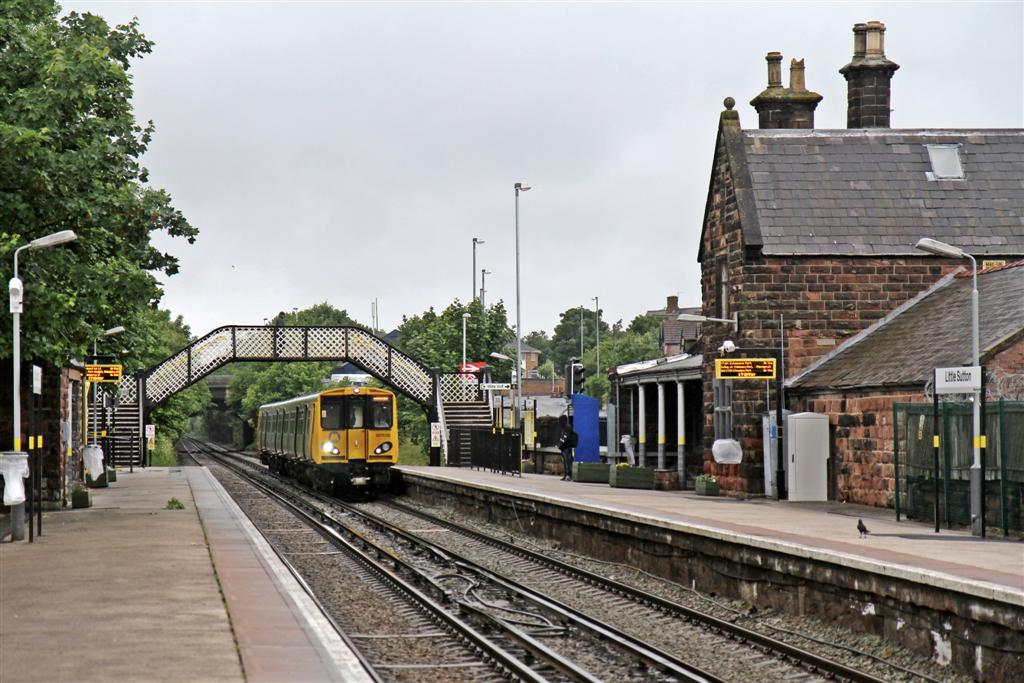

General information
- Location: Little Sutton, Cheshire, Cheshire West and Chester; England
- Coordinates: 53.2854°N 2.9433°W
- Grid reference: SJ372769
- Manager: Merseyrail
- Transit authority: Merseytravel
- Platforms: 2

Other information
- Station code: LTT
- Fare zone: G1
- Classification: DfT category F2

Passengers
- 2021/22: ▲0.118 million
- 2022/23: ▲0.151 million
- 2023/24: ▲0.171 million
- 2024/25: ▲0.184 million
- 2025/26: ▲0.203 million
Location
Notes
- Passenger statistics from the Office of Rail and Road

Little Sutton railway station serves the village of Little Sutton, near Ellesmere Port, Cheshire, England. It is situated on the Hooton–Helsby line and is served by the Wirral Line which is part of the Merseyrail network. The station is recorded in the National Heritage List for England as a designated Grade II listed building. The station opened in 1863 as "Sutton" and was renamed Little Sutton in 1886. It became part of the Merseyrail network in 1994, when the branch from Hooton to Ellesmere Port was electrified by British Rail, and through train services to Liverpool via Birkenhead commenced.

Between the 2013/14 and 2019/20 periods, Little Sutton was the least-used station on the Merseyrail network. Since 2020/21 it is the second least-used station on the network.

== Facilities ==
The station has platform CCTV. Each platform has a sheltered waiting area. There are electronic departure and arrival screens, on the platform, for passenger information. There is a payphone, next to the entrance, on platform 2. There is ramp access, to each platform, for passengers with wheelchairs or prams. However, cross-platform access, within the station, is by staircase only. Platform access has not been modernised to the standard of that at Hooton.

Little Sutton is one of four stations on the Merseyrail network that is Unstaffed, the others being Bache, Capenhurst and Overpool. Passengers purchase tickets from the Ticket Vending Machine located on the platform. This machine can issue tickets to any destination on the rail network. Passengers failing to purchase a ticket will be liable for a Penalty Fare if they board a Merseyrail service without obtaining a valid ticket. The station became part of the Merseyrail Penalty Fares Area on 15 June 2009.

== Services ==
This station is served by trains bound for Liverpool Central and Ellesmere Port, with platform 1 serving Ellesmere Port bound services and platform 2 serving Liverpool bound services, and is classed by Merseyrail as part of the Ellesmere Port branch of the Wirral Line.

Services call at this station every thirty minutes or less, including Sundays. These services are all provided by Merseyrail's fleet of Class 507 and Class 777 EMUs.

== Gallery ==
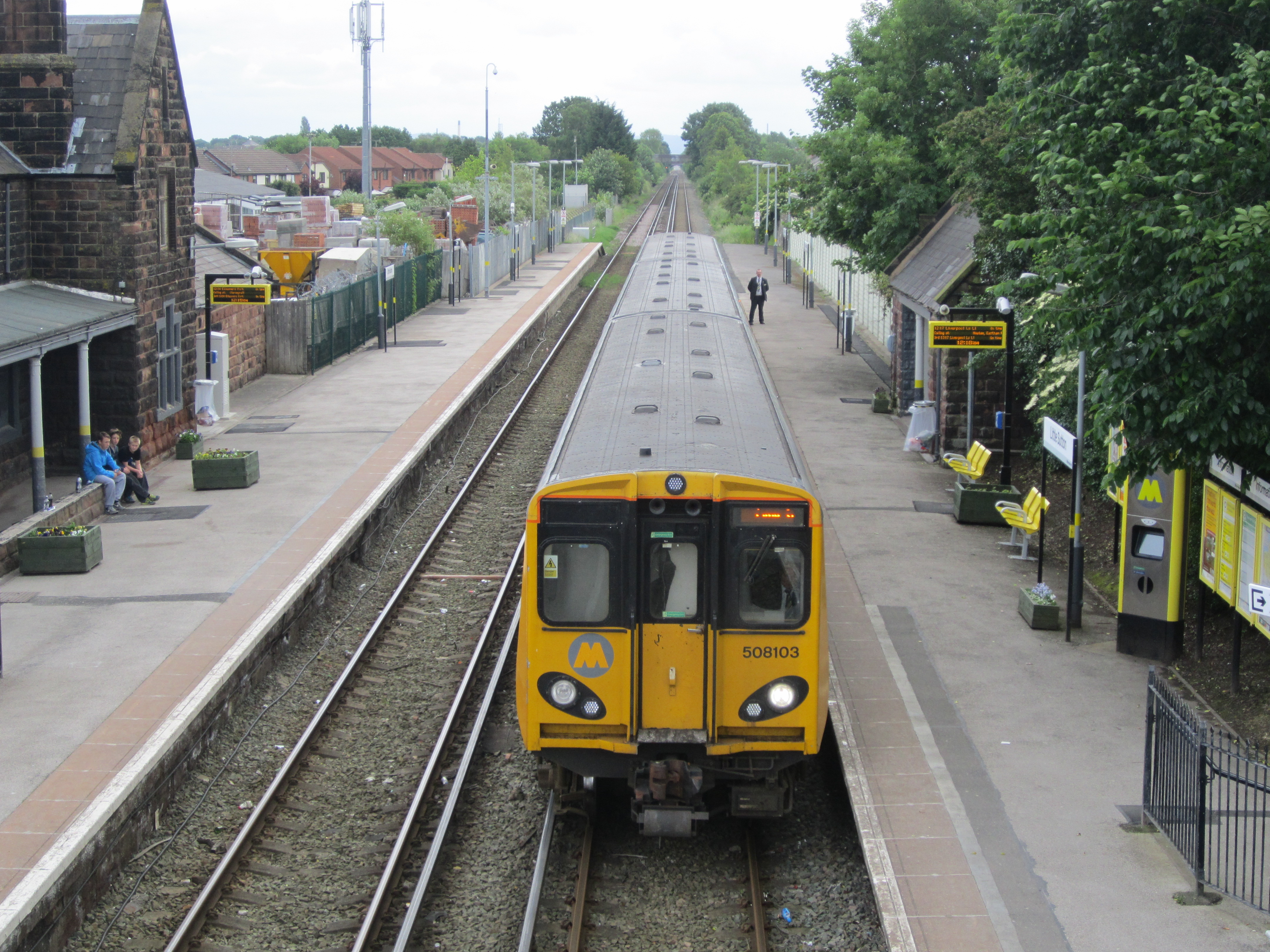
A Merseyrail Class 508 at the station, with a service to Liverpool Central.

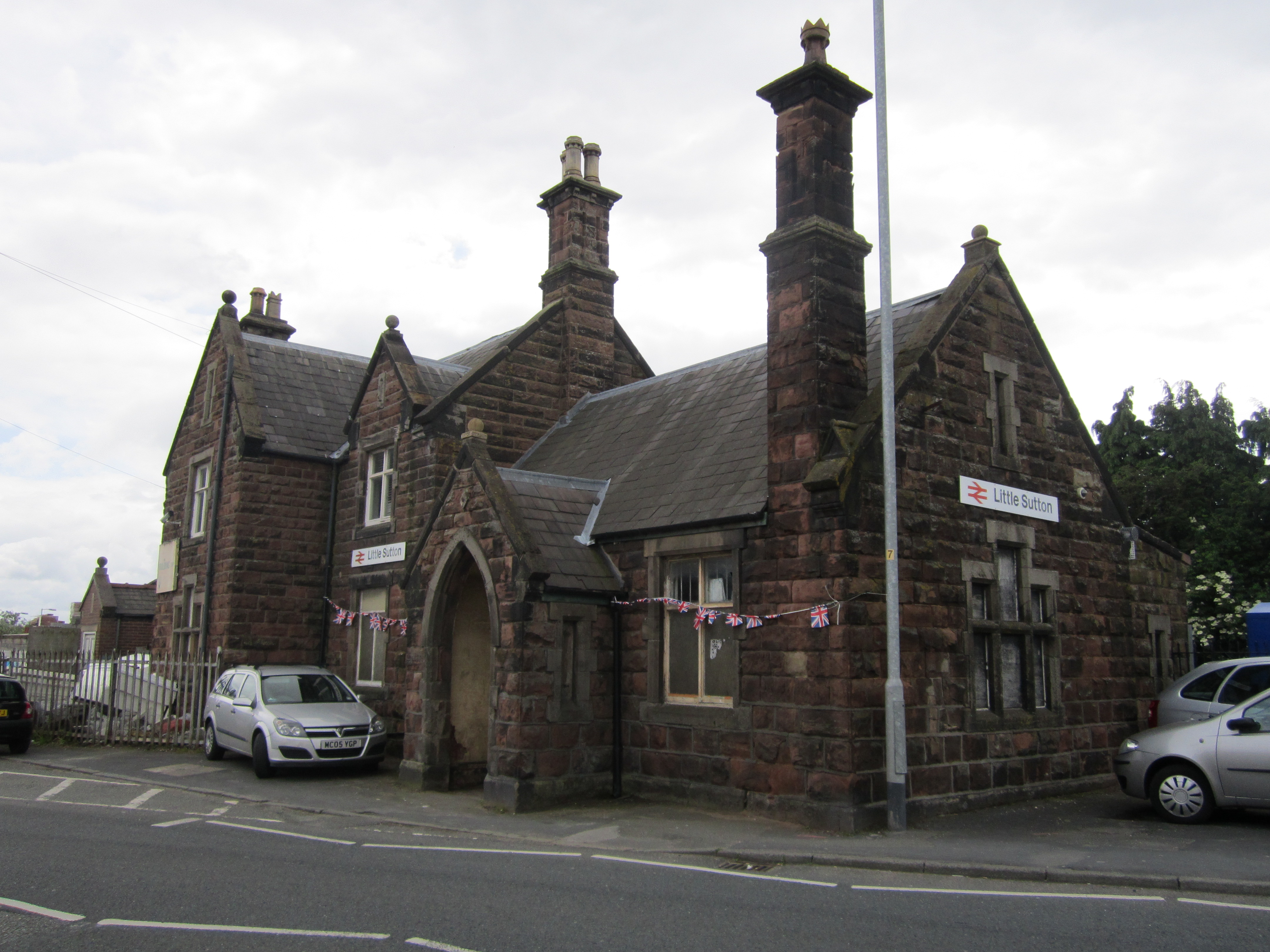
The booking office, seen from the street.

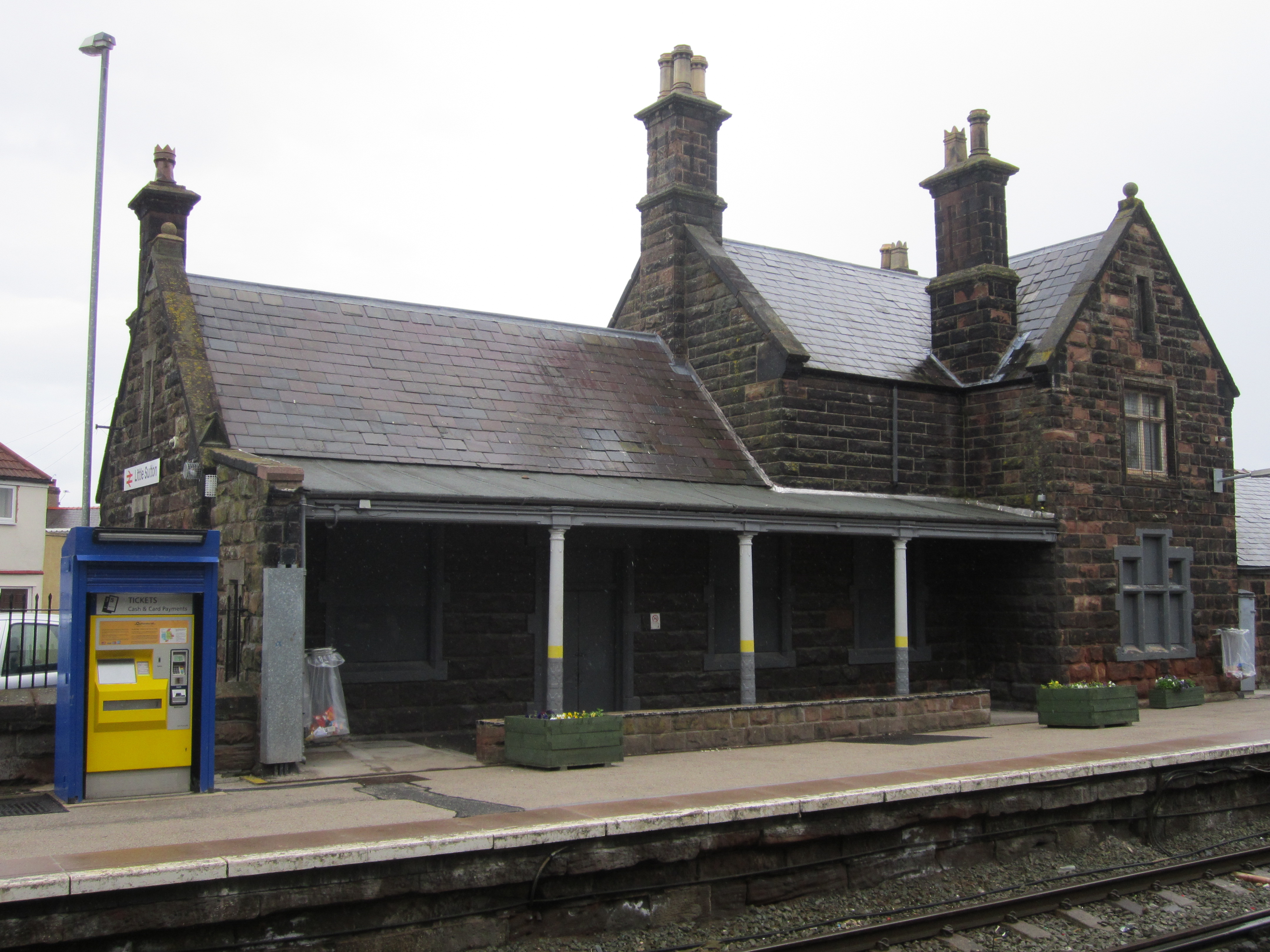
A platform view of the booking office.

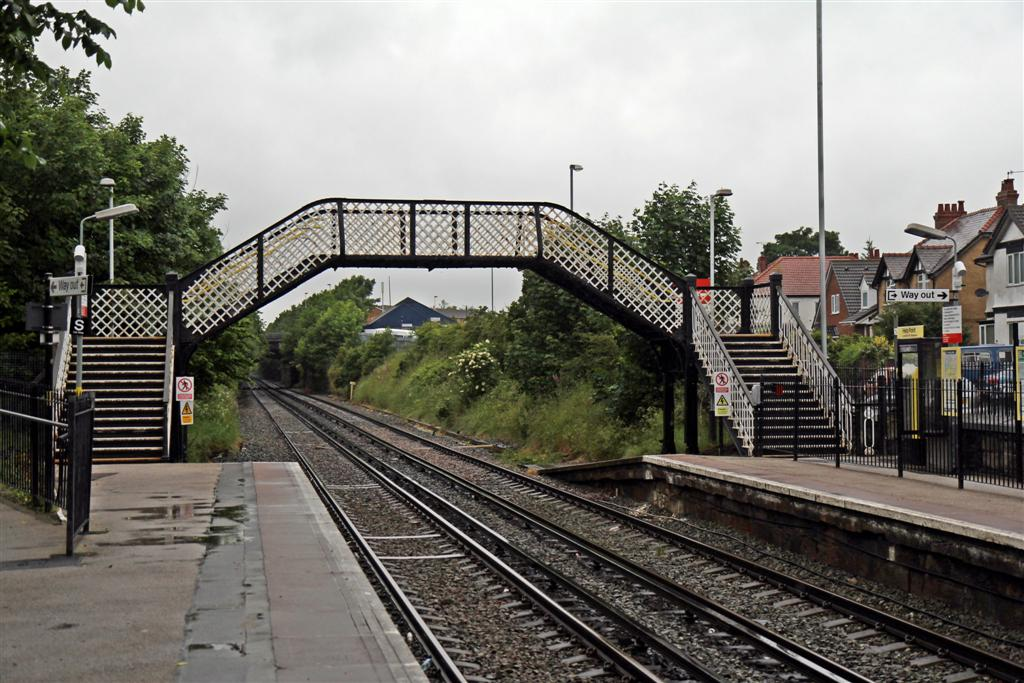
The footbridge.

Preceding station	National Rail	Following station
Overpool towards Ellesmere Port	Merseyrail; Hooton–Helsby line Wirral Line; Ellesmere Port Branch	Hooton towards Liverpool Central
