= Bache railway station =

Railway station on the Chester branch of the Wirral line in England

Bache
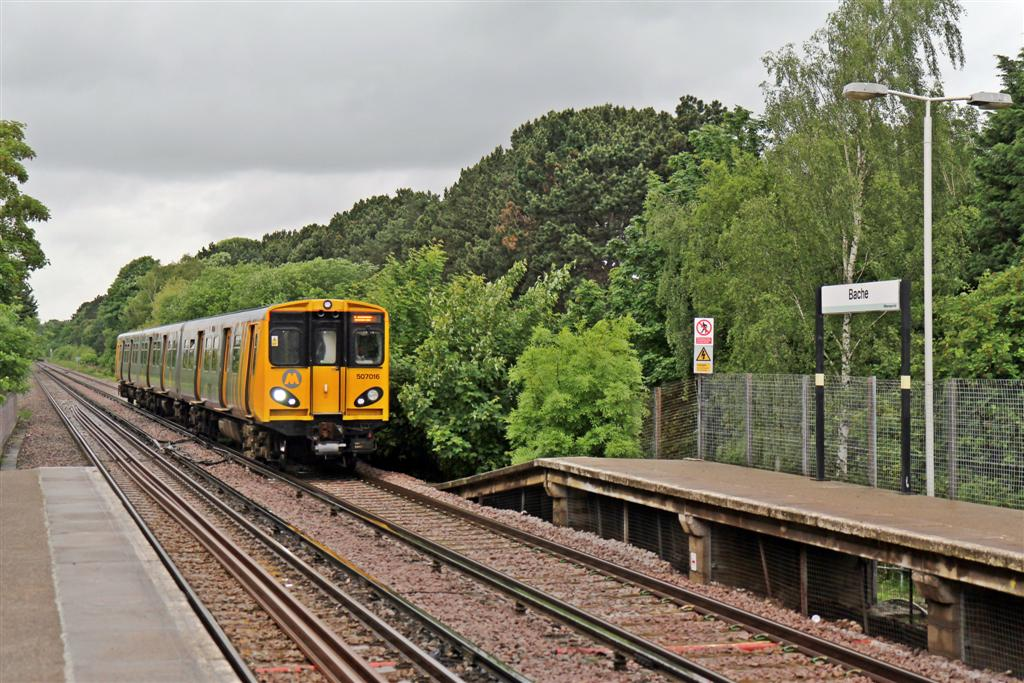

General information
- Location: Bache, Cheshire West and Chester; England
- Coordinates: 53.2080°N 2.8914°W
- Grid reference: SJ405683
- Manager: Merseyrail
- Transit authority: Merseytravel
- Platforms: 2

Other information
- Station code: BAC
- Fare zone: G2
- Classification: DfT category F2

History
- Original company: British Rail

Key dates
- 9 January 1984: Opened

Passengers
- 2021/22: ▲0.308 million
- 2022/23: ▲0.347 million
- 2023/24: ▲0.403 million
- 2024/25: ▲0.495 million
- 2025/26: ▲0.561 million
Location
Notes
- Passenger statistics from the Office of Rail and Road

Bache railway station (/ˈbeɪtʃ/, baytch) serves the suburbs of Bache and Upton-by-Chester in the north of the city of Chester, England. It is the first station for Merseyrail services leaving Chester on the Wirral Line. Passengers can alight here for the Countess of Chester Hospital which is close by, and regular bus services to Chester Zoo.

== History ==
The station opened in January 1984 by British Rail in conjunction with a new supermarket being developed by Safeway (now Morrisons) on the site of a former railway coalyard. It replaced the nearby Upton-by-Chester railway station, which was sited 2,300 feet (700 m) to the north next to Liverpool Road. The relocation of the station produced an immediate and dramatic uplift in the number of passengers using it.

The modern station has two small covered waiting areas, information boards, CCTV and a footbridge. The platforms are made out of concrete slabs that are laid on brick foundations. A remotely operated public address system was installed in January 2012 together with automatic train departure indicators.

== Facilities ==
The station has platform CCTV, a 61-space car park, a cycle rack with 8 spaces and secure cycle storage for 20 bikes. There are departure and arrival screens on the platform, for passenger information. There is ramp access, to each platform, for passengers with wheelchairs or prams. However, cross-platform access, within the station, is by staircase only.

Bache is one of four unstaffed stations on the Merseyrail network, the others being Capenhurst, Little Sutton and Overpool. Since Bache became part of the Merseyrail Penalty Fares Area on 15 June 2009, intending passengers must purchase rail tickets (available to any destination on the UK rail network) from the ticket-vending machine, before boarding a train. This is located on the Liverpool-bound platform.

== Services ==
Trains operate every 15 minutes during the working day from Monday to Saturday southwards towards Chester and northwards towards Liverpool Lime Street/Liverpool Central via Hooton, Rock Ferry and Birkenhead Central. Later in the evening and on Sundays the service is half-hourly. During the periods of quarter-hourly services, alternate trains run through Capenhurst non-stop between Hooton and Bache in each direction. These services are all provided by Merseyrail's fleet of Class 777 EMUs.

== Problems ==
Merseyrail leases Bache railway station car park from Morrisons Supermarket. Rail users' vehicles parked in the supermarket's own parking area because of lack of spaces in the designated Station Car Park are issued penalty tickets. Intending rail passengers who arrive to find the designated Station Car Park full and wish to avoid a penalty ticket as well as staff at and visitors to the nearby Countess of Chester Hospital are creating problems for local residents by leaving their vehicles in adjacent roads and streets.

== Gallery ==
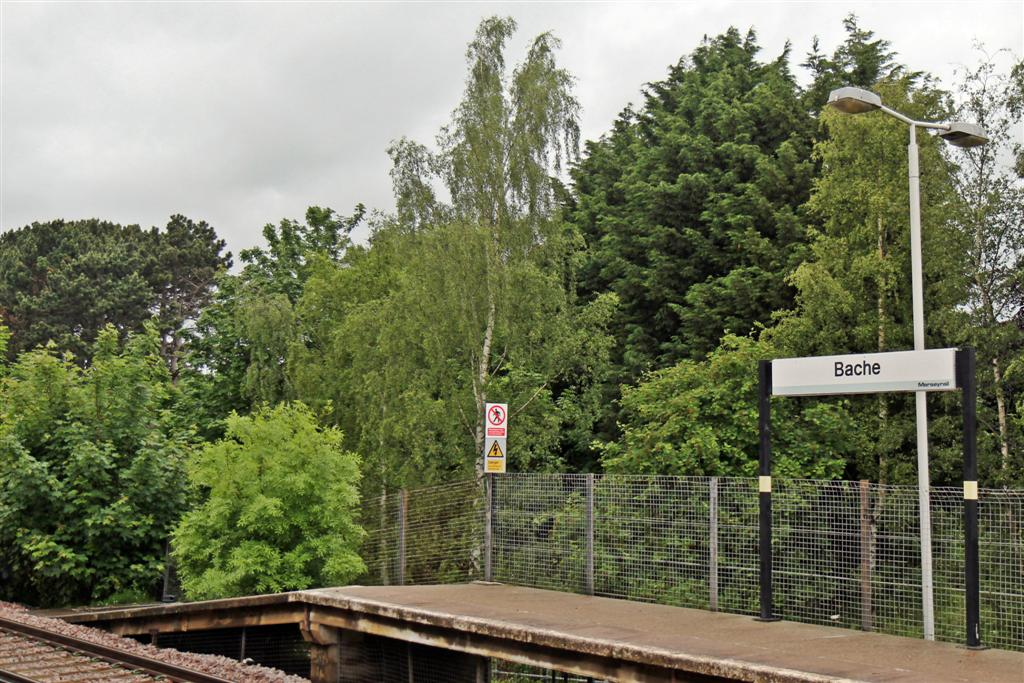
The end of the platform

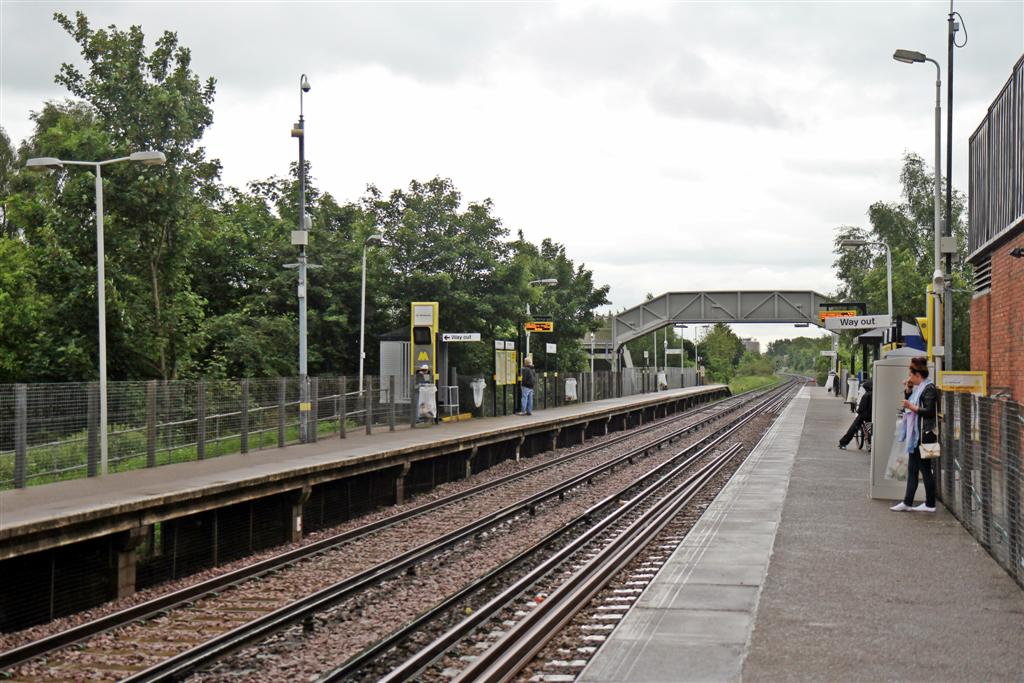
Platforms and footbridge

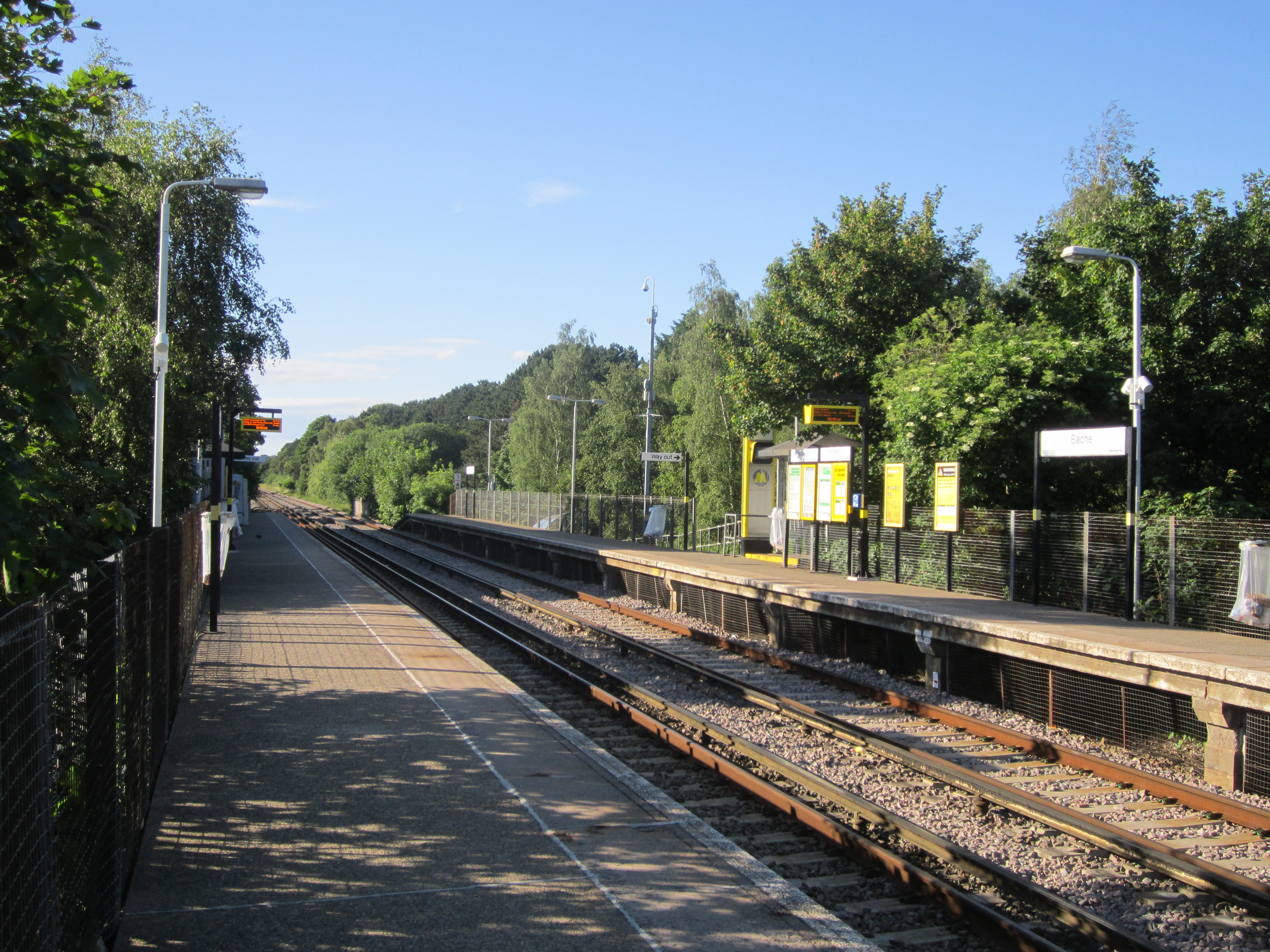
A view in the opposite direction

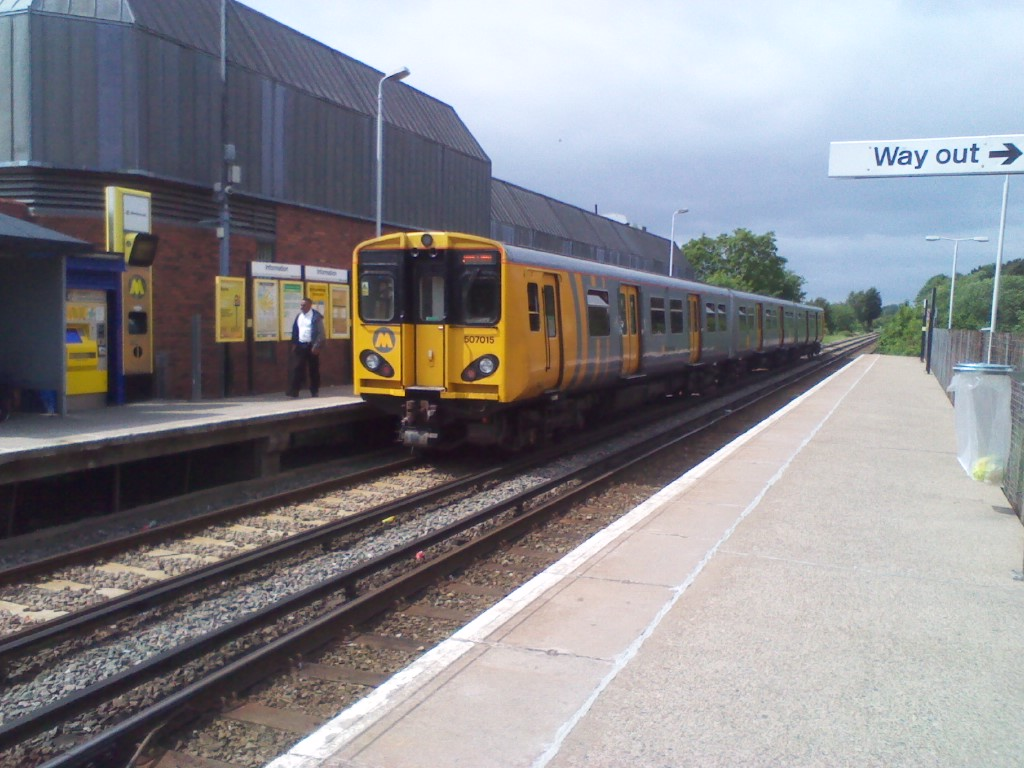
A Merseyrail Class 507 at the station

Preceding station	National Rail	Following station
Chester; Terminus	Merseyrail; Wirral Line; Chester Branch	Capenhurst or Hooton towards Liverpool Central
