= Overpool railway station =

Railway station on the Ellesmere Port branch of the Wirral line in England

Overpool
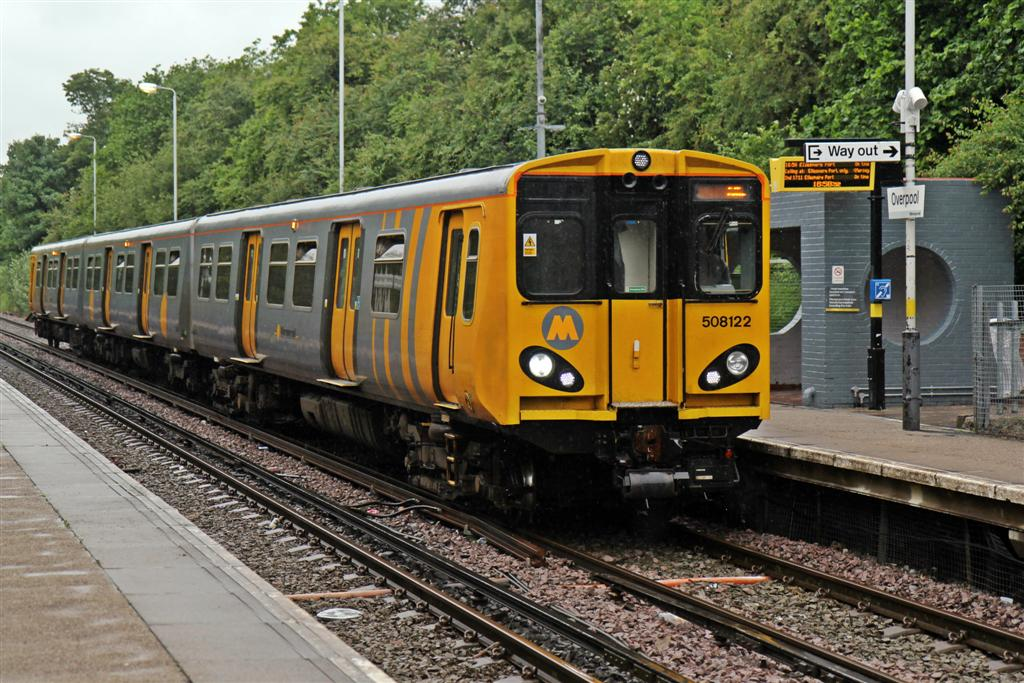

General information
- Location: Overpool, Cheshire West and Chester; England
- Coordinates: 53.284°N 2.925°W
- Grid reference: SJ384767
- Manager: Merseyrail
- Transit authority: Merseytravel
- Platforms: 2

Other information
- Station code: OVE
- Fare zone: G1
- Classification: DfT category F2

Passengers
- 2021/22: ▲0.149 million
- 2022/23: ▲0.192 million
- 2023/24: ▲0.227 million
- 2024/25: ▼0.224 million
- 2025/26: ▲0.234 million
Location
Notes
- Passenger statistics from the Office of Rail and Road

Overpool railway station was opened on 17 August 1988 and serves the central area of Ellesmere Port, Cheshire, England. It is situated on the Hooton–Helsby line and is served by the Wirral Line which is part of the Merseyrail network.

It became part of the Merseyrail network in 1994, when the branch from Hooton to Ellesmere Port was electrified, and through train services to Liverpool via Birkenhead commenced.

== Facilities ==
The station has platform CCTV. Each platform has a sheltered waiting area. There are live electronic departure and arrival screens, on the platform, for passenger information. There is a payphone, next to the entrance, on platform 1. There is ramp access, to each platform, from the Overpool Road bridge, for passengers with wheelchairs or prams.

Overpool is one of four stations on the Merseyrail network that are unstaffed, the others being Bache, Capenhurst and Little Sutton. Passengers purchase tickets from the Ticket Vending Machine located on the platform. This machine can issue tickets to any destination on the rail network. Passengers failing to purchase a ticket will be liable for a Penalty Fare if they board a Merseyrail service without obtaining a valid ticket.

This station became part of the Merseyrail Penalty Fares Area on 15 June 2009.

== Services ==
Overpool is served by trains every 30 minutes (all day every day, including Sundays) between Ellesmere Port and Liverpool. These services are all provided by Merseyrail's fleet of Class 507 and Class 777 EMUs.

== Gallery ==
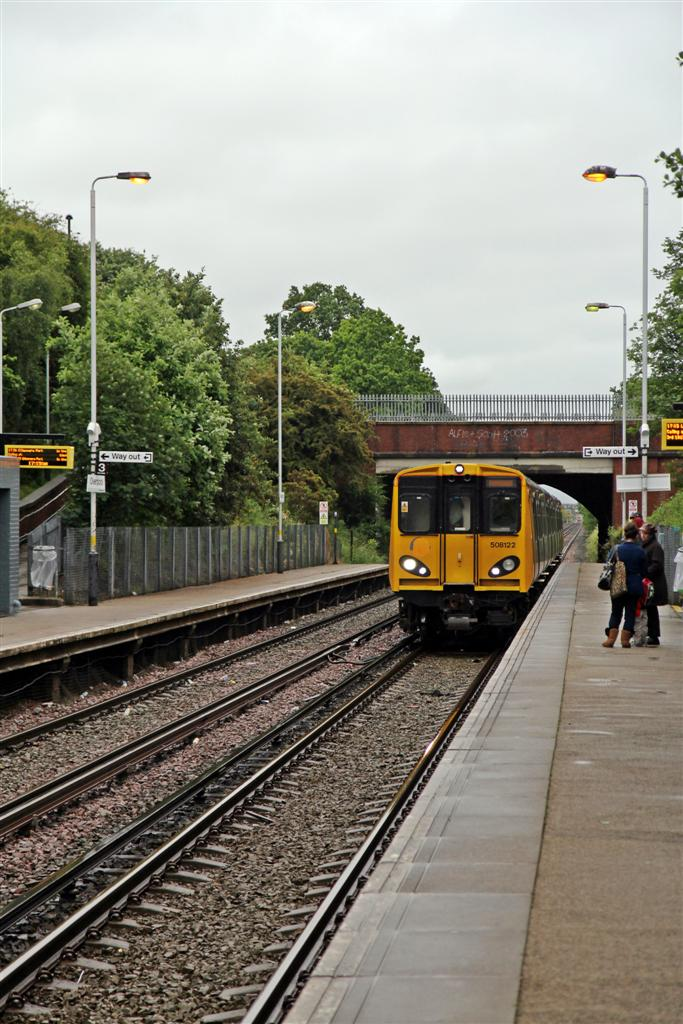
A Class 508 arrives with a service to Liverpool.

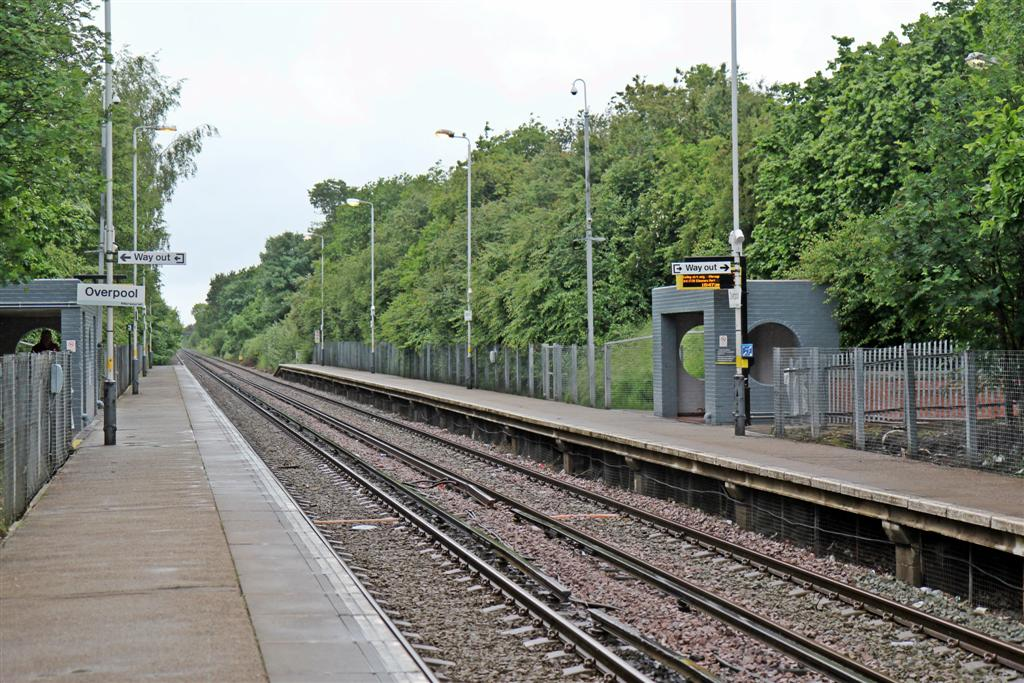
The station platforms.

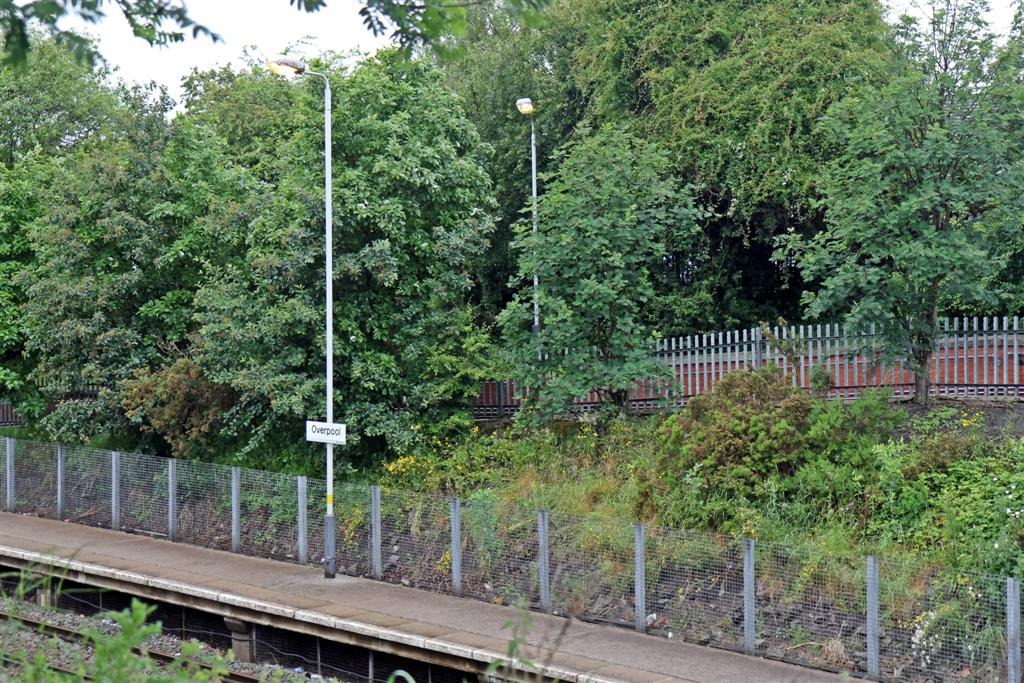
The entrance ramp to one of the platforms.

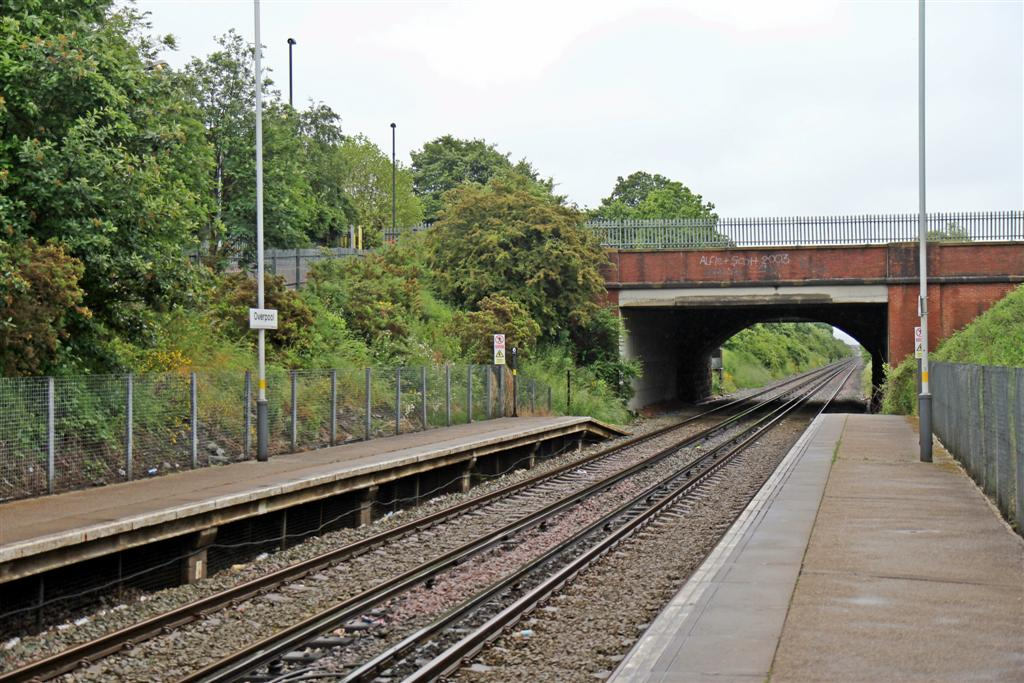
The platforms and footbridge.

Preceding station	National Rail	Following station
Ellesmere Port; Terminus	Merseyrail; Wirral Line; Ellesmere Port Branch	Little Sutton towards Liverpool Central
