= Hall Road TMD =

Railway maintenance depot in Merseyside, England

- Interactive map of Hall Road TMD

Location
- Location: Blundellsands, Merseyside, United Kingdom
- Coordinates: 53.4979°N 3.0503°W
- OS grid: SD303006

Characteristics
- Owner: Merseyrail
- Depot code: HR (1973-1997)
- Type: EMU, Sandite

History
- Opened: 1939
- Closed: 1997
- Original: LMS
- Post-grouping: LMS
- BR region: London Midland Region

Hall Road TMD was a railway traction maintenance depot situated adjacent to Hall Road railway station, Merseyside, England. The depot was a facility for storage and servicing of Merseyrail multiple units and rolling stock. It had two shed roads and four additional siding tracks; each road had capacity for three Class 507 or Class 508 electric multiple unit (EMU) sets (9 carriages). The depot code was HR.

== History ==
The depot was built in 1939 by the London, Midland and Scottish Railway to provide additional capacity for the new fleet of Class 502 EMUs then being delivered. From 1978 it began to house the new Merseyrail Class 507 and, later, Class 508 units. The Class 507 EMUs were far more regularly seen at the depot until its final years of use when the Class 508s began to be used interchangeably with the Wirral Line. A Class 936 departmental train, used for Sandite and de-icing duties, was often stabled in the shed.

The depot was taken out of use in 1997; from then on all stock on the Northern Line was serviced at Kirkdale or Birkenhead North depots. Some of the tracks to the depot and the local signal were removed during summer 2006.

== Demolition ==
A plan had been drawn up by the 502 Group to use Hall Road TMD as a base for their train and for its restoration. However, the building had become unsafe and was demolished in April 2009. Nothing remains of the depot as of 2013.
