= Southport Wall Sidings =

Train stabling point in Southport, Merseyside

- Interactive map of Southport Wall Sidings

Location
- Location: Southport, Merseyside
- Coordinates: 53.6455°N 3.0013°W
- OS grid: SD338170

Characteristics
- Owner: Network Rail
- Operator: Merseyrail
- Depot code: ST (1987 -)
- Type: EMU

Southport Wall Sidings are located in Southport, Merseyside, England, on the Merseyrail Northern Line adjacent to Southport station.

== Present ==
Stabling is provided for Merseyrail Class 507 and Class 508 EMUs.
