= British Rail Class 777 =

Merseyrail electric multiple unit trains

British Rail Class 777 METRO
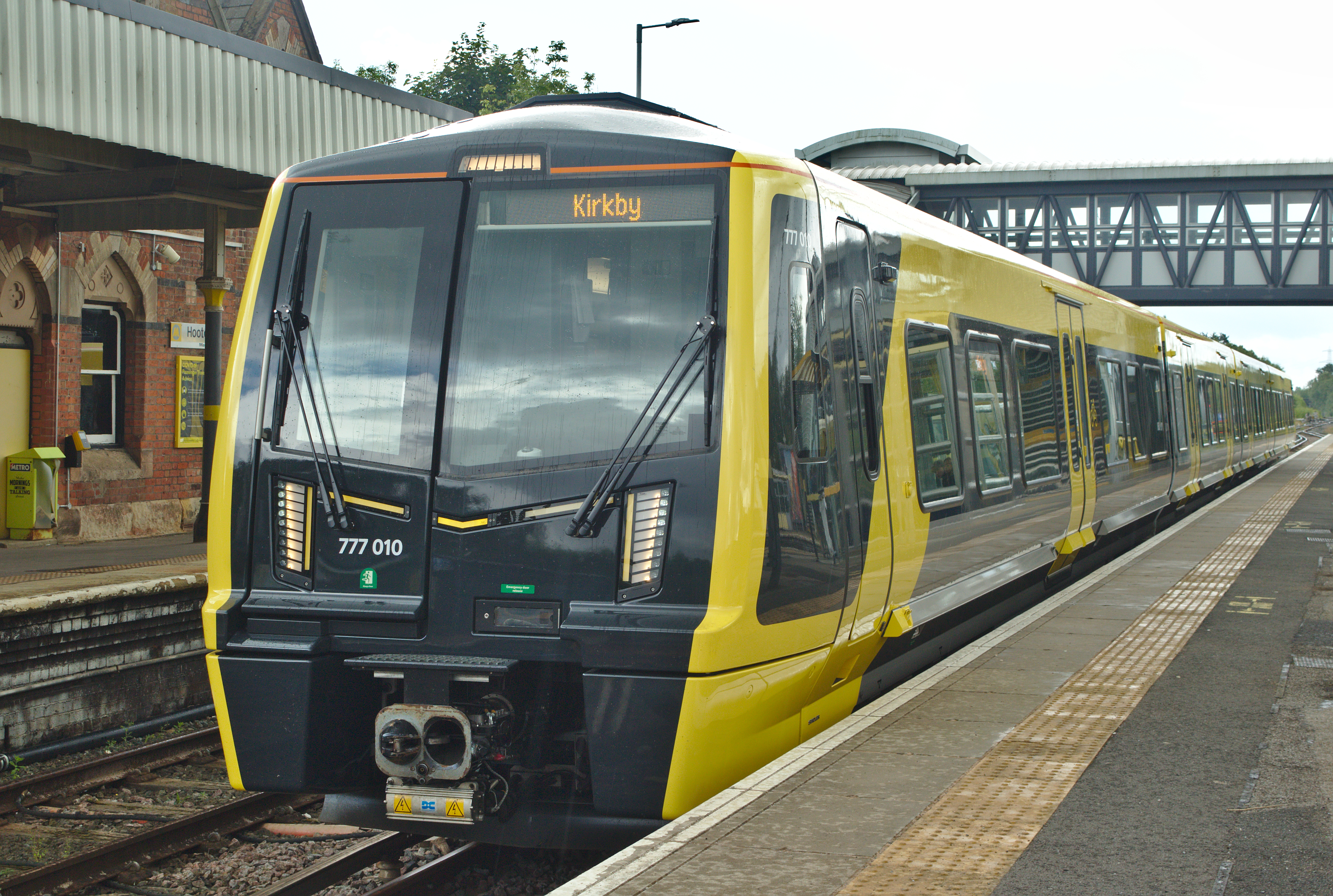
- Merseyrail Class 777 at Hooton

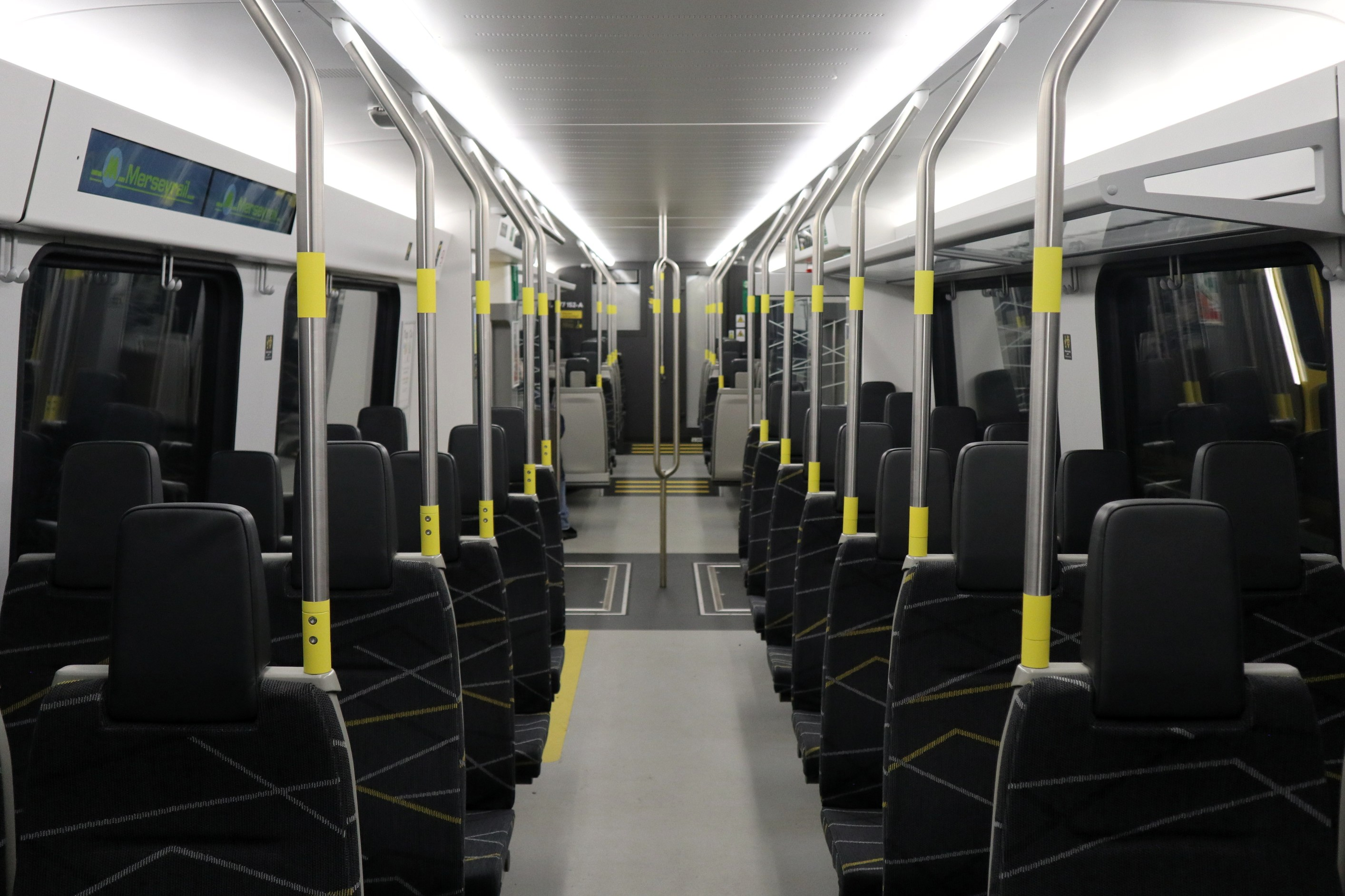
- Interior
- In service: 23 January 2023 – present
- Manufacturer: Stadler Rail
- Assembly: Stadler Altenrhein AG; Stadler Rheintal AG
- Built at: Altenrhein, Switzerland; Siedlce, Poland
- Family name: METRO
- Replaced: Class 507; Class 508
- Constructed: 2018–2023
- Number built: 53
- Formation: 4 cars per unit: DTSO-MSO-MSO-DTSO
- Fleet numbers: (see § Fleet details)
- Capacity: 182 seats
- Owner: Merseytravel
- Operator: Merseyrail
- Depots: Birkenhead North (Wirral); Kirkdale (Liverpool)
- Lines served: Northern Line; Wirral Line

Specifications
- Car body construction: Aluminium
- Train length: 64.98 m (213 ft 2 in)
- Width: 2.820 m (9 ft 3.0 in)
- Height: 3.828 m (12 ft 6.7 in)
- Floor height: 960 mm (3 ft 2 in)
- Doors: Double-leaf sliding plug, each 1.300 m (4 ft 3.2 in) wide (total 6 per side)
- Wheel diameter: 760 mm (30 in)
- Wheelbase: Bogies: 2.400 m (7 ft 10.5 in)
- Maximum speed: On external supply: 75 mph (120 km/h); 777/1 in battery mode: 62 mph (100 km/h) (Note: The Stadler datasheet for the IPEMU variant (subclass /1) quotes 100 km/h, but the accompanying press release specifies 80 km/h (50 mph) instead.)
- Weight: 99 t (97 long tons; 109 short tons)
- Traction system: IGBT-VVVF
- Traction motors: 6 × TSA TMF 50-20-4, each of 250 kW (340 hp)
- Power output: At wheels: Max.: 2,100 kW (2,800 hp); Cont.: 1,500 kW (2,000 hp)
- Tractive effort: Starting: 162 kN (36,000 lb_{f})
- Acceleration: Starting: 1.1 m/s^{2} (2.5 mph/s)
- Electric systems: 750 V DC third rail
- Current collection: Contact shoe
- UIC classification: 2′(Bo)′(Bo)′(Bo)′2′
- Braking systems: Electro-pneumatic and regenerative
- Safety systems: AWS; TPWS; Tripcock
- Coupling system: Dellner
- Multiple working: Within class (max. 2 units)
- Track gauge: 4 ft 8 1/2 in (1,435 mm) standard gauge

Notes/references
- Sourced from unless otherwise noted.

The British Rail Class 777 METRO is a class of electric multiple unit passenger trains delivered by the Swiss rolling stock manufacturer Stadler Rail, being used on the Merseyrail network in the Liverpool City Region and adjacent areas of Cheshire and Lancashire. The trains have the ability to operate on the third rail-powered sections of the network, with some units carrying onboard batteries to allow use on unpowered track. Ordered in 2016, construction of the units began in 2018. The first unit entered service on 23 January 2023, following delays to the deployment programme. The Class 777 replaced Merseyrail's Class 507 and Class 508 units, which were built between 1978 and 1980. Seven units of the total 53 ordered are configured as battery electric multiple units (BEMUs) for use on non-electrified lines, being designated subclass 777/1.

== History ==
=== Background ===
The replacement of the Class 507 and Class 508 fleet that has been in use on the Merseyrail commuter rail network since the late 1970s, had been proposed by Merseytravel as early as 2011. In May 2023, the Class 313 (which entered service in 1976) was withdrawn, making the Class 507 and 508 the oldest electric multiple units in passenger service on the National Rail network. However, the older 1972 stock and 1973 stock are still in service on the London Underground.

In 2014, Liverpool City Region set out a 30 year rail vision, outlining investments that would and could be made to improve rail transport in the region. This included replacement of both the Class 507 and 508 trains with a new high capacity, dual voltage train fleet. In 2015, Merseytravel gained approval to go out to tender to replace the train fleet. In January 2016, Merseytravel announced that a total of five rolling-stock manufacturers had been shortlisted to build the new fleet – Bombardier, Siemens, CAF, Stadler Rail, and a consortium of Mitsui, Alstom, and the East Japan Railway Company.

=== Contract award ===
On 16 December 2016, Merseytravel announced Stadler Rail would manufacture a new fleet of 52 dual-voltage-capable articulated four-car units as part of a £460 million fleet replacement project. Merseytravel has an option for a further 60 units. Delivery of the Class 777 fleet was scheduled to start in mid-2019, and its entry into service was set for the following year. The new trains would increase capacity by 60%, and cut journey times due to faster acceleration.

The purchase was financed by Liverpool City Region itself, rather than an external agency such as a bank or rolling stock leasing company. The Class 777 units will therefore be owned by the regional public transport operator Merseytravel and leased to the franchise operator Merseyrail; this made Merseytravel the only public-sector mainline rolling-stock owner in the United Kingdom. This is unlike the preceding fleet, owned by the private leasing agent Angel Trains.

Merseytravel elected to have the new fleet's maintenance requirements addressed via a contract with Stadler; this arrangement included the modernisation of two existing traction maintenance depots (TMD), at Kirkdale and Birkenhead North. For training purposes, a driver cab simulator has been installed in Kirkdale TMD.

As part of Merseytravel's plan to extend the Kirkby line to the new Headbolt Lane railway station using battery-powered Class 777 units, the Class 777 order was increased from 52 to 53 units so that there would be sufficient stock for battery testing to take place.

=== Infrastructure modifications ===
To accommodate the new Class 777 fleet, extensive infrastructure changes were necessitated. These adaptations were performed under a rolling programme between October 2018 and May 2019; changes included adjustments to 97 platforms at 56 stations across the Merseyrail network, along with track realignments and other refinements, primarily for the purpose of improving passenger accessibility. Another cause for the alterations was the increased length of the new units, which was addressed via a mixture of platform lengthening and signal repositioning where required. The programme was structured as to minimise disruption to Merseyrail's scheduled services wherever possible. A new trackside Wi-Fi network, provided by Panasonic, was installed to provide continuous real-time connectivity between all trains and the Sandhills control centre, along with free internet access for passengers. New bulk power supplies were installed, along with eight new substations and miscellaneous cable upgrades, to provide greater quantities of electricity.

Unlike the preceding trains, the Class 777 was designed to be operated without guards; however, the announced proposal to redeploy guards into other customer service roles within Merseyrail was subject to considerable criticism. Accordingly, while the fleet was initially to be launched under driver-only operations, in September 2018 it was announced that there would be a second member of staff on board, ending a two-year dispute between the National Union of Rail, Maritime and Transport Workers (RMT) and Merseyrail.

=== Testing and delivery ===
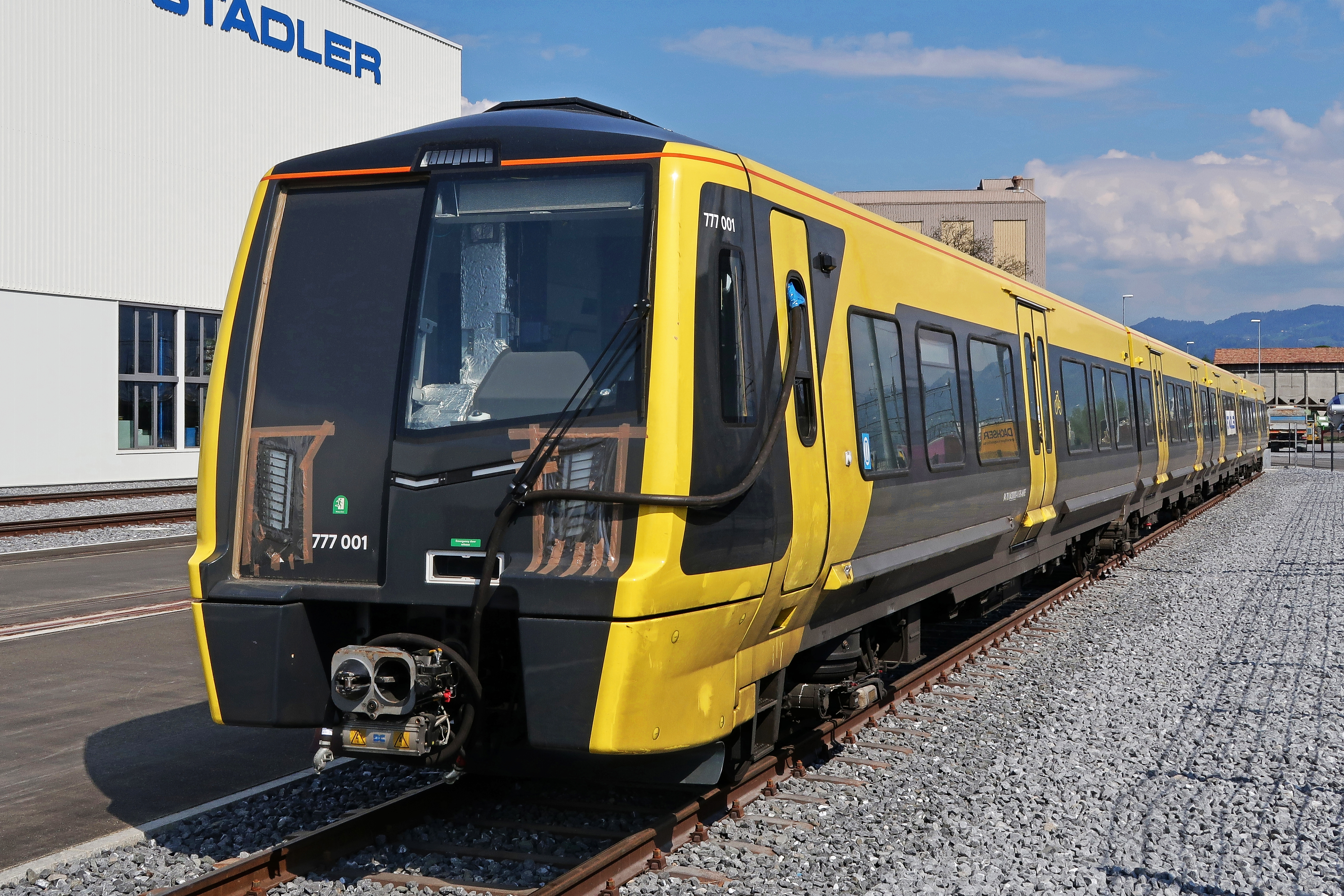
Undergoing preliminary testing in St. Margrethen in Switzerland, with a temporarily-fitted windowless front emergency door

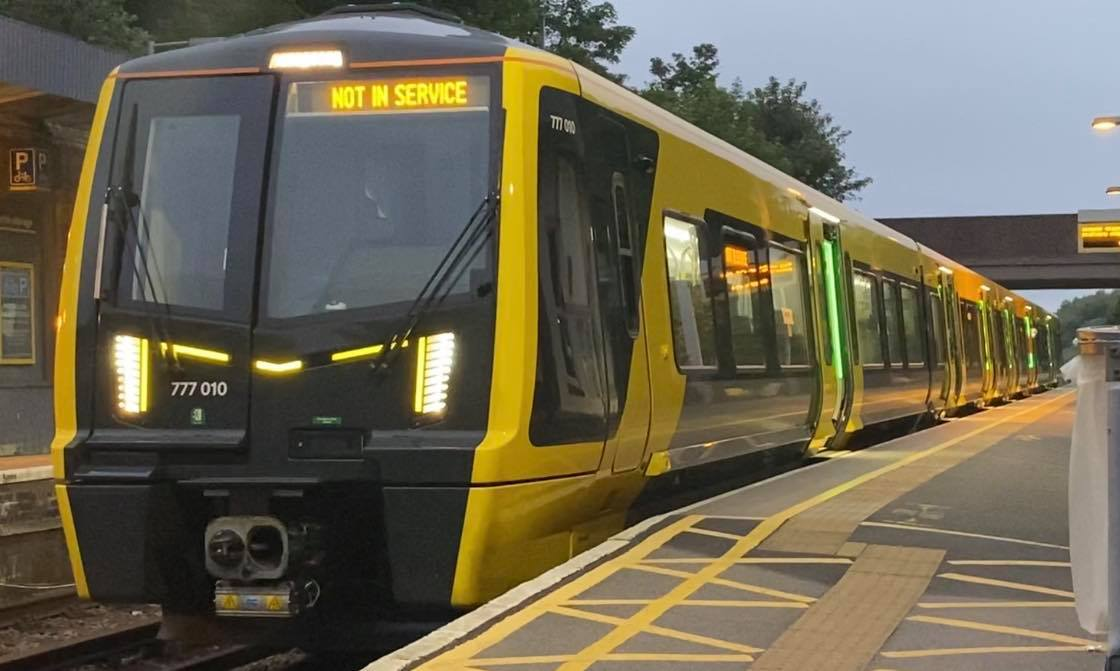
Class 777 with passenger doors open and sliding gap-fillers deployed

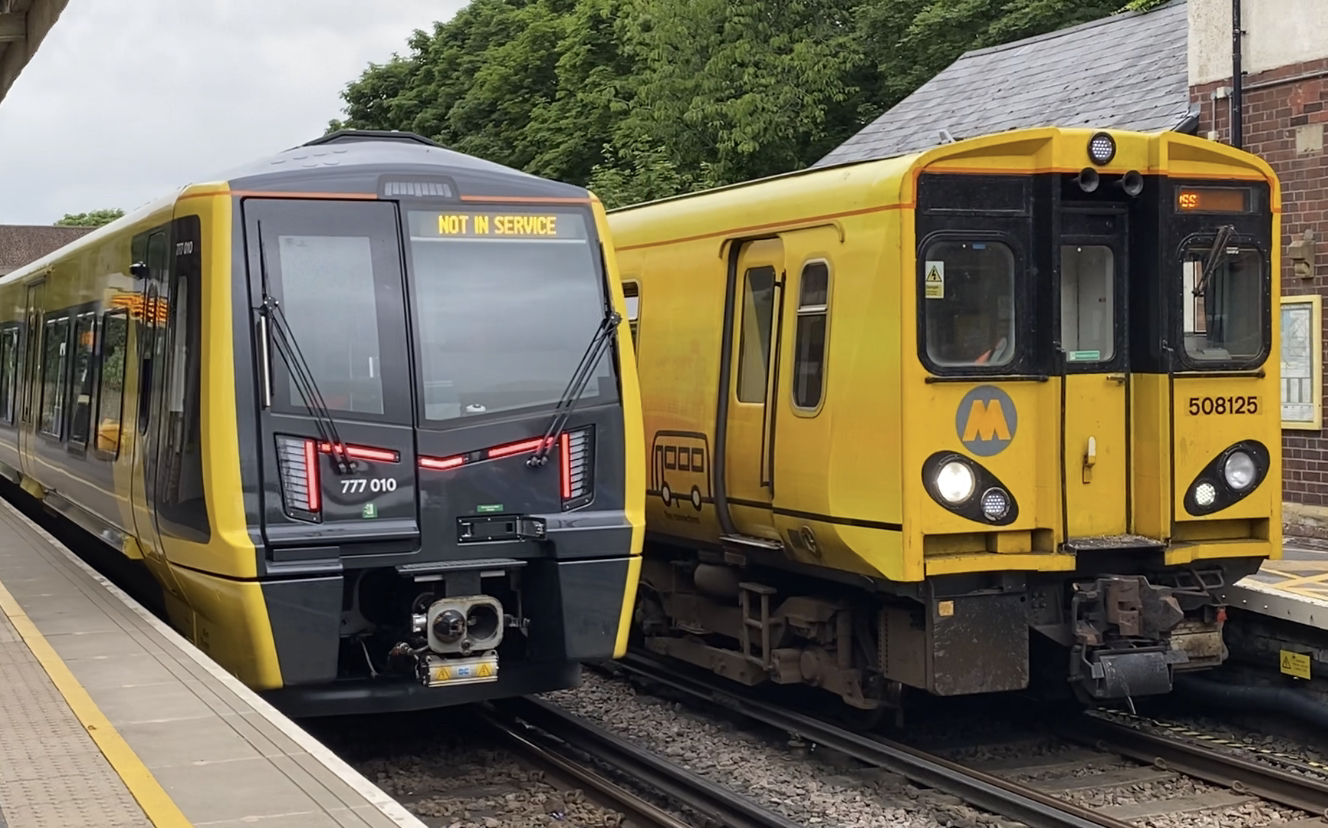
Class 777 alongside Class 508

During early October 2018, the bodyshells for the first unit were completed. This unit subsequently underwent pre-delivery dynamic testing in both Switzerland and Germany during late 2019. The first unit was delivered to Kirkdale TMD on 16 January 2020. On 16 March 2020, the unit commenced test runs on the Kirkby branch of the Northern Line. Crew training began in November 2022.

In 2018, it was announced that a train configured as a battery electric multiple unit was to be tested on sections of unelectrified track. Following the trial, it was announced in July 2021 that the units tested had been able to travel up to 20 miles (32 km) without the need for recharging. The Liverpool City Region Combined Authority announced that the battery-powered trains will run to the new Headbolt Lane station at Kirkby, which opened on 4 October 2023. In December 2022, a maximum test range of 135 km (84 miles) was achieved, which was "much longer than we expected".

In July 2021, full daytime testing of the units was underway. In August 2021, the Office of Rail and Road (ORR) authorised the introduction of these units into passenger operation. In May 2022, it was expected that the fleet would be "phased into service by autumn" of the same year, with no exact date given.

Passenger services with the class commenced on 23 January 2023. The fleet was further rolled out over the following weeks, and from 6 March 2023, the 4 train per hour service was restored on the Kirkby line, with Class 777 units being exclusively used, however on some dates, old Class 507 and Class 508 stock was used due to various technical faults. In preparation for the Grand National, the Class 777s were introduced in small numbers on the Ormskirk branch from 10 March 2023, In preparation for the Eurovision Song Contest 2023, which took place in Liverpool, units received a special Eurovision decal, with one train receiving a full Eurovision livery.

By July 2023, the roll out was still plagued by "teething" and "software" issues, further delaying the introduction of the units. Metro Mayor Steve Rotheram criticised Stadler, requesting compensation for the "frustratingly poor" roll-out of the trains. However, by November 2024, the previous fleet had been fully withdrawn.

== Design ==
As part of the Stadler METRO train family, the units were built on the same platform as the BVG Class IK stock used on the Berlin U-Bahn and new trains being introduced on the Minsk Metro and Tyne and Wear Metro. The units are configured for high-capacity, delivering a 50% increase in per-carriage capacity than the preceding fleets. They have a higher rate of acceleration, yet use 20% less energy than the old rolling stock, due to increased system efficiency and a reduced weight, being roughly 5.5 tonnes lighter. The introduction of the Class 777 is reportedly set to achieve a 10% reduction in journey time over older stock, attributed to its greater rate of acceleration. There is also an emphasis on shared data; the number of passengers on board is monitored and relayed to Merseyrail's Sandhills control centre, allowing for more informed and responsive management of the network.

Each Class 777 unit has two longer driving trailer vehicles positioned at each end, with one set of twin doors on either side, and two intermediate motor cars with two sets of doors. For accessibility purposes, all doorways have been outfitted with sliding steps that move into position when the train is stopped at a platform, enabling passengers using wheelchairs to board and disembark without relying upon a separately deployed ramp. The carriages features an open gangway design, the first class of train on the Merseyrail network to feature this design. The passenger facilities are much improved over legacy stock, each carriage being fitted with modern amenities such as electrical and USB sockets, as well as bike racks. Like the previous Class 507 and 508 fleets, the Class 777s are not fitted with toilets. As part of the bespoke design, an LED letter 'M' has been sandwiched between the headlight clusters, illuminating yellow on the front of the train, and red on the rear.

Because current regulatory policy makes it unlikely that future extensions of Merseyrail's unshielded third rail traction power supply will be approved, Class 777 units were delivered with provision for the future installation of 25 kV 50 Hz AC overhead line traction equipment. There is also allowance for the trains to be configured as battery electric multiple units (BEMUs), which would allow them to operate on unelectrified lines without needing infrastructure upgrades, eventually employed on the extension to Headbolt Lane. This is in addition to the backup battery set that was fitted to all Class 777 units from new, as these only have capacity for short-distance low-speed movements around depots and maintenance facilities.

After successful trials of battery operation in 2021, the Class 777 order was amended so that seven units out of the total 53 would be delivered with the additional traction battery equipment. These units, which Stadler refer to as "independently powered" EMUs, were numbered in subclass 777/1. The battery packs were carried on the underframes of the DTSO (driving trailer) vehicles, while the battery cooling systems are placed on the roofs of the same vehicles. Charging can be performed from the third-rail supply, as well as from regenerative braking. Stadler claim that the battery packs will have a lifespan of at least eight years or 10,000 charge/discharge cycles.

Class 777/1 additional details:
Battery technology	LTO-NMC
Total battery capacity	320 kWh
Battery operating voltage	386 V DC
Expected battery lifetime	at least 8 years
Nominal battery range	34 miles (55 km)
Max speed in battery mode	62 mph (100 km/h)
Unit axle load	max. 16.9 tonnes (16.6 long tons; 18.6 short tons)

== Fleet details ==
Units with even numbers were built in Altenrhein, Switzerland, while those with odd numbers were built in Siedlce, Poland.

Subclass	Operator	Qty.	Year built	Cars per unit	Unit nos.	Notes
777/0	Merseyrail	46	2018–2022	4	777001–777039,777041, 777043, 777045, 777047, 777049, 777051, 777053	Standard variant.
777/1	Merseyrail	7	2022–2023	4	777140, 777142, 777144, 777146, 777148, 777150, 777152	Variant fitted with traction batteries for use on unelectrified lines.

=== Illustration ===
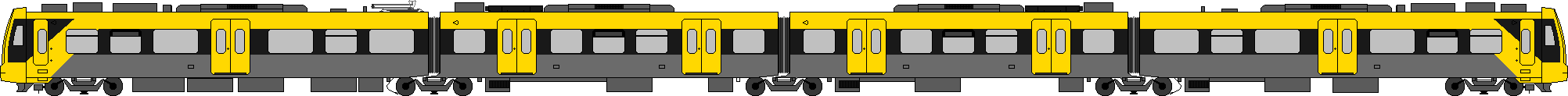
Illustration of a Merseyrail Class 777 unit (based on concept art)

=== Special livery ===
In May 2023, unit 777013 was given a Eurovision Song Contest 2023 themed vinyl wrap livery, to celebrate the contest taking place in Liverpool.

=== Named units ===
In May 2024, unit 777041 was named Sir Samuel Cunard, after the founder of the Cunard shipping and ocean liner company, Samuel Cunard.
