= Birkenhead North TMD =

Rail depot in Birkenhead, England

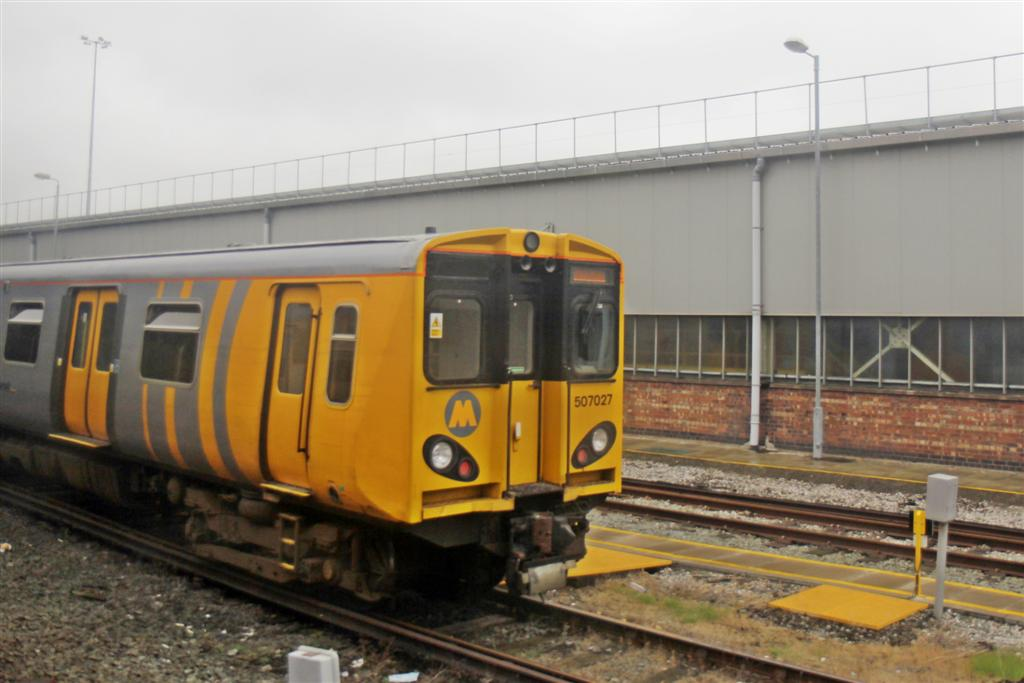
- A Merseyrail Class 507 outside the depot.
- Interactive map of Birkenhead North TMD

Location
- Location: Birkenhead, Wirral
- Coordinates: 53.4065°N 3.0581°W
- OS grid: SJ296905

Characteristics
- Owner: Network Rail
- Operator: Merseyrail (1976-2020); Stadler (2020-present)
- Depot code: BD (1976–pres)
- Type: EMU; BEMU
- Rolling stock: Class 230; Class 777

History
- Opened: c. 1899
- Original: Wirral Railway
- Former depot code: BN (1973–76)
- Former rolling stock: Class 503 (1938–85); Class 508 (1979–2023); Class 507 (1978–2024)

Birkenhead North TMD is a traction maintenance depot, which is owned by Network Rail and operated by Stadler. Located opposite Birkenhead North railway station, it is currently responsible for servicing and stabling Merseyrail's fleet of class 777 electric multiple units and also services and stables Transport for Wales' fleet of 5 Class 230 diesel-battery electric multiple units.

Birkenhead North's current depot code is BD, having been changed from BN in 1976.

== History ==
=== Early history ===
The former Bidston Shed, which was allocated the shed code 6F, was situated on the opposite side of the tracks, and slightly further towards Bidston, from the depot. An Ordnance Survey map shows that the site of Birkenhead North TMD was occupied by a railway depot by 1899, although an exact date of opening is unknown. However, the actual Birkenhead North engine shed, as it was then named, was located to the north of the present depot, on the goods line to the docks.

=== Recent history ===
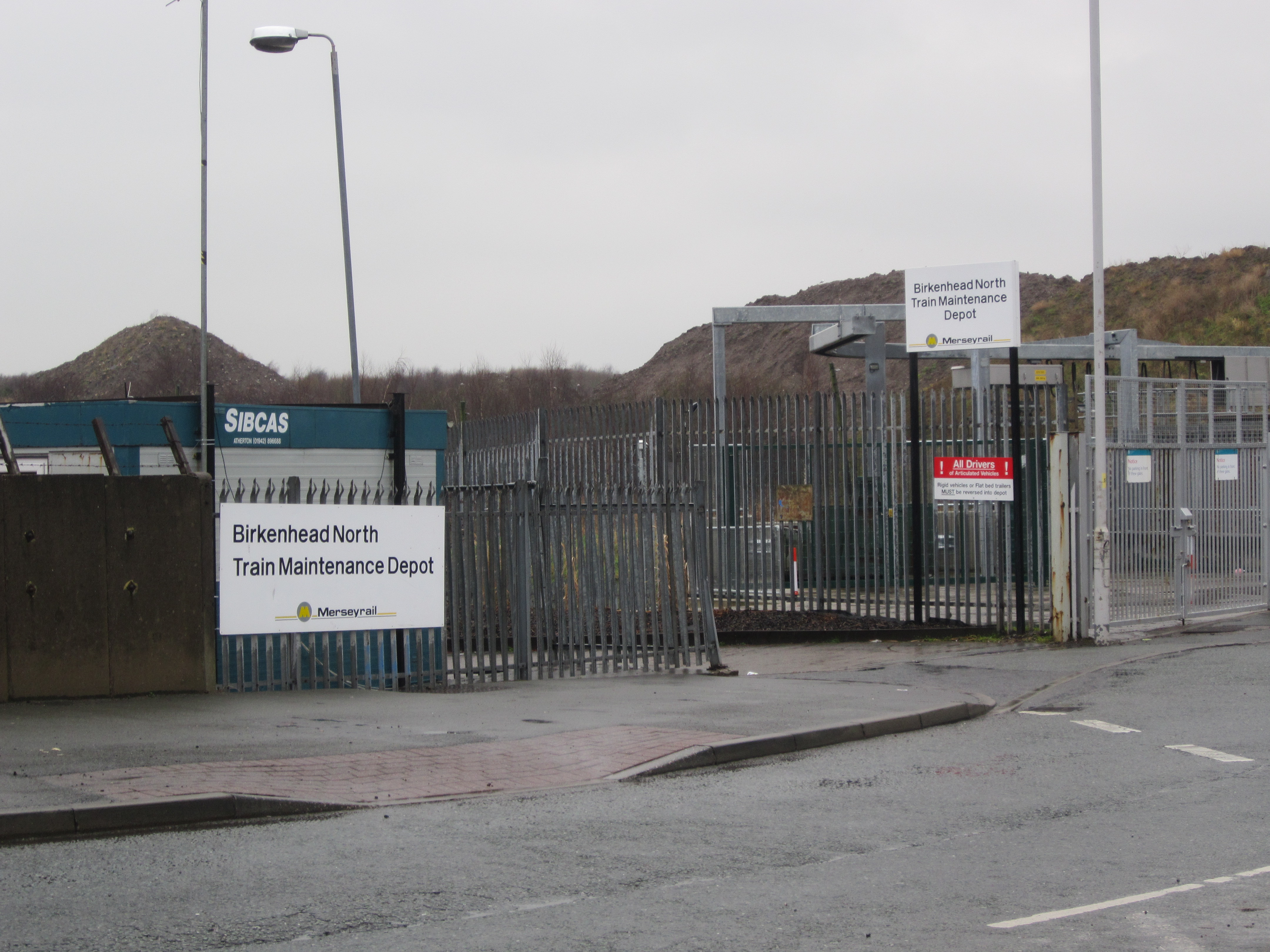
The entrance gates of Birkenhead North TMD

In 1985 and 1986, in order to celebrate the 100th anniversary of railways in the area, a "100 Years of Mersey Railways" was held. Birkenhead North depot was used to hold two open days, and during both events, a number of mainline locomotives were on display at the depot. Among the locomotives which were included in the celebratory events were a Class 40 locomotive (40122, ex D200) as well as a Class 50 locomotive (50007 Sir Edward Elgar, ex Hercules).

=== Future ===
In 2023 Transport for Wales began running the Class 230 along the Borderlands line and based its fleet of 5 trains out of Birkenhead North. They invested in fuel pumps and fuel emptying facilities in the depot to maintain the trains between services.

Merseyrail's aging fleet of Class 507 and 508 units were replaced between 2022 and 2024 by a fleet of Class 777 units built by Stadler Rail at Bussnang, Switzerland. As part of the overall fleet replacement project, which will cost £460 million, both Kirkdale and Birkenhead North depots were upgraded to a standard which will be capable of maintaining the new trains.

As part of its refurbishment, Birkenhead North TMD will have its carriage wash plant upgraded, with the depot becoming more of a focus for cleaning, stabling and light maintenance, a role which is currently fulfilled by Kirkdale TMD.

Unlike with the arrangement for the previous fleet of Class 507 and 508 units, Birkenhead North is not the main maintenance hub for the new fleet of Class 777s, with this role being assigned to a rebuilt Kirkdale depot instead.

== Allocation ==
Currently, Class 777 electric multiple units and Class 230 diesel-battery electric multiple units are based at Birkenhead North depot, with previously stored Class 507 and Class 508 having been withdrawn by Merseyrail.

Previously, battery locomotives and Class 73 locos have been stored at the depot in the past for sandite duties in the winter. Network Rail stables its MPV diesel unit(s) here occasionally during the leaf fall season. Departmental equipment for Sandite duties has in the past included Class 73 (/0 and /9), Class 97/7 and Class 936 traction.

Four Class 03 diesel shunters (03073, 03162, 03170 and 03189) were also previously allocated to Birkenhead North depot. These locomotives were deployed on dock shunting duties on the now disused Birkenhead Dock Branch, serving in this role until 1989. After the Class 03s became surplus to requirements, all four examples were sold to railway heritage preservation groups.
