= British Rail Class 507 =

Class of electric multiple unit train

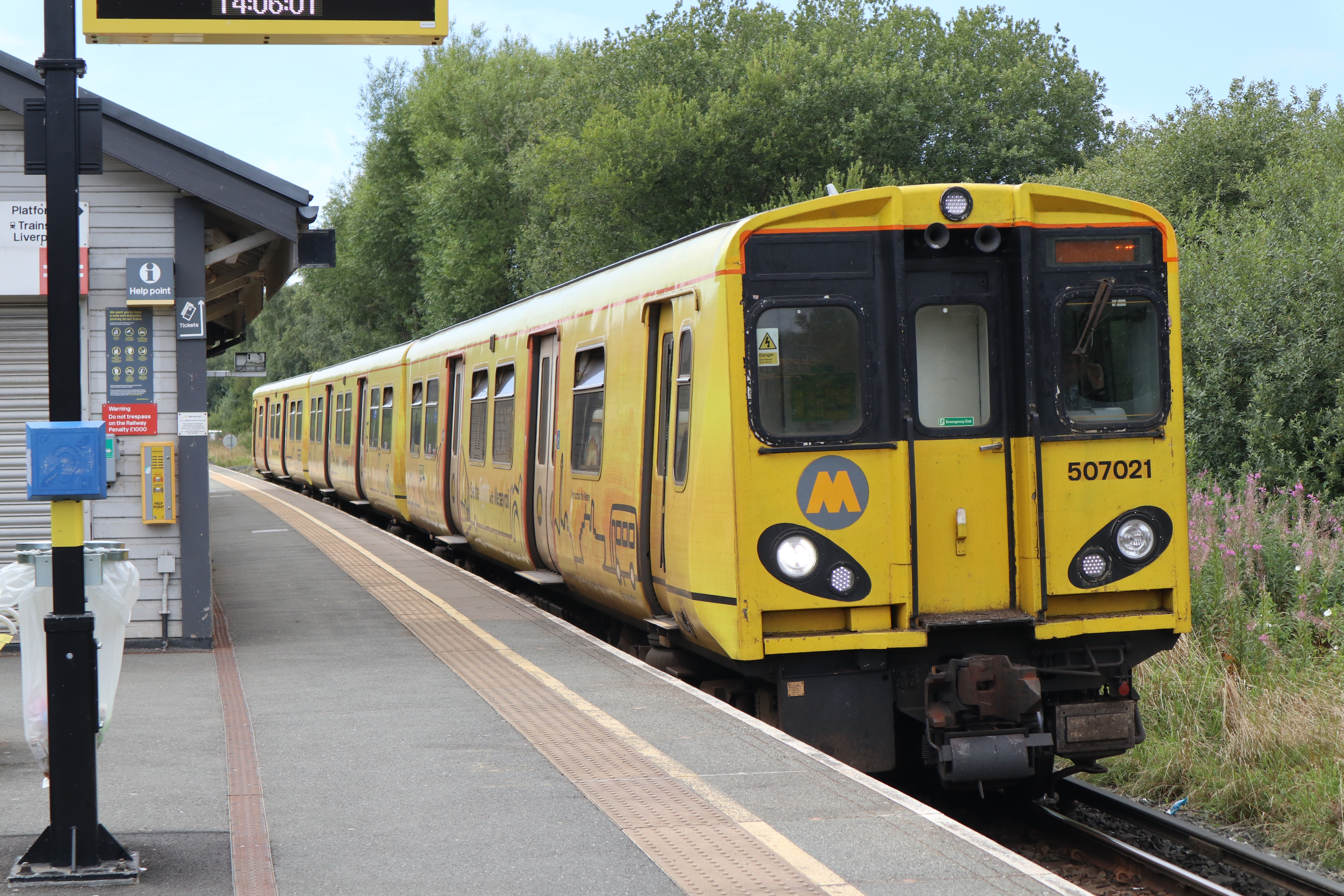
- Merseyrail Class 507 at Bidston in 2023

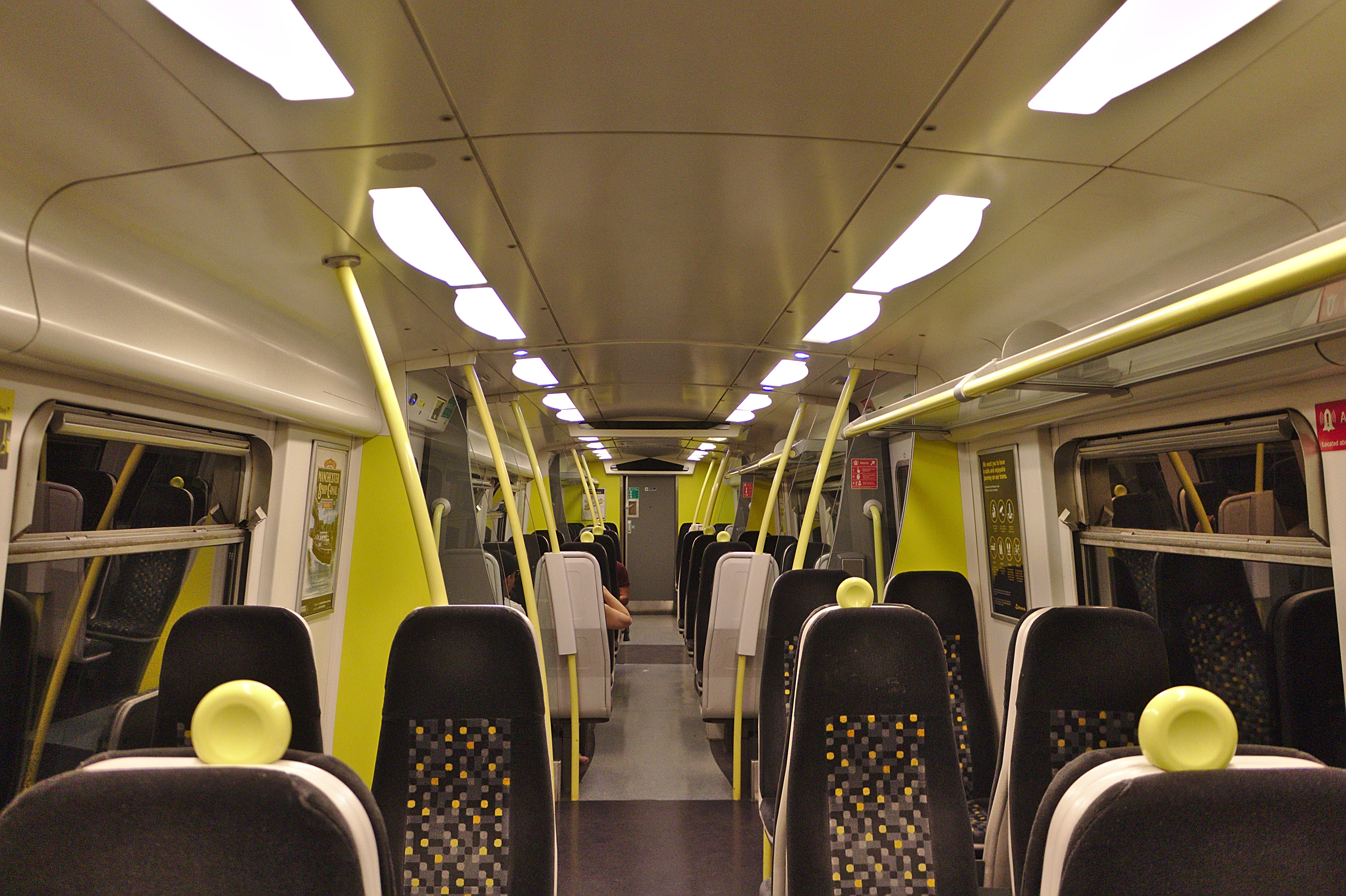
- The interior of a refurbished Class 507 unit
- In service: 1 November 1978–28 November 2024
- Manufacturer: British Rail Engineering Limited
- Order nos.: 30906 (BDMSO vehicles); 30907 (TSO vehicles); 30908 (DMSO vehicles)
- Built at: Holgate Road Works, York
- Family name: BREL 1972
- Replaced: Class 502
- Constructed: 1978–1980
- Refurbished: 2002–2005 at Alstom, Eastleigh Works
- Scrapped: 2023–2025
- Number built: 33
- Number preserved: 1
- Number scrapped: 32
- Successor: Class 777
- Formation: 3 cars per unit: BDMSO-TSO-DMSO
- Diagram: BDMSO vehicles: EI202; TSO vehicles: EH205; DMSO vehicles: EA201
- Fleet numbers: 507001–507033
- Capacity: As built: 234 seats; As modified: 222 seats; As refurbished: 192 seats
- Owner: Angel Trains
- Operator: Merseyrail
- Depots: Birkenhead North (Wirral); Kirkdale (Liverpool); Hall Road (Blundellsands)
- Lines served: Northern line; Wirral line

Specifications
- Car body construction: Steel underframe and body frame, aluminium body and roof
- Car length: DM vehs.: 19.800 m (64 ft 11.5 in); Trailers: 19.920 m (65 ft 4.3 in)
- Width: Over Body: 2,820 mm (9 ft 3 in); Over Tread plates: 3,023 mm (9 ft 11.0 in)
- Height: 3,582 mm (11 ft 9.0 in)
- Floor height: 1,146 mm (3 ft 9.1 in)
- Doors: Double-leaf pocket sliding, each 1,288 mm (4 ft 2.7 in) wide (2 per side per car)
- Wheelbase: Over bogie centres: 14.170 m (46 ft 5.9 in)
- Maximum speed: 75 mph (120 km/h)
- Weight: BDMSO vehs.: 37.06 t (36.47 LT; 40.85 ST); TSO vehs.: 25.60 t (25.20 LT; 28.22 ST); DMSO vehs.: 35.62 t (35.06 LT; 39.26 ST)
- Traction motors: 8 × GEC G310AZ (82 kW (110 hp) each, 4 per motor car)
- Power output: 656 kW (880 hp)
- HVAC: Electric heating (ducted warm air)
- Electric systems: Third rail, 650–750 V DC
- Current collection: Contact shoe
- UIC classification: Bo′Bo′+2′2′+Bo′Bo′
- Bogies: BREL BX1
- Minimum turning radius: 70.4 m (231 ft 0 in)
- Braking systems: Electro-pneumatic (disc) and rheostatic
- Safety systems: AWS; TPWS
- Coupling system: Tightlock
- Multiple working: Within class, and with Class 508
- Track gauge: 1,435 mm (4 ft 8 1/2 in) standard gauge

Notes/references
- Specifications as at August 1982 except where otherwise noted.

The British Rail Class 507 electric multiple unit (EMU) passenger trains were built by British Rail Engineering Limited at Holgate Road carriage works in two batches from 1978 to 1980. They are a variant of British Rail's standard 1972 design for suburban EMUs derived from PEP stock, which eventually encompassed 755 vehicles over five classes (Class 313, 314, 315, 507 and 508). They worked on the Merseyrail network from new until their retirement in November 2024. Between 2002 and 2005, all units were refurbished by Alstom's Eastleigh Works.

Following the withdrawal of the Class 313 fleet in 2023, the Class 507s became the oldest EMUs operating on the mainline rail network in Great Britain until their withdrawal in 2024. However, the even older 1972 Stock and 1973 Stock are still in service on London Underground's Bakerloo and Piccadilly lines.

== History ==
With the Class 502 units life-expired, unable to cope with the demands of the new Link tunnel and approaching 40 years old, by 1977 a replacement was sought. Owing to the success of the Class 313 fleet on suburban services from King's Cross, four sets were temporarily transferred to Merseyside and based at Hall Road TMD. Sets 313013/063 were used for clearance trials on the Southport, Ormskirk and Kirkby-Garston lines. The results showed that a similar type of stock would be suitable for the Merseyrail Northern line.

Initially, 47 sets were ordered (507001–507047) but cost issues forced this number to be reduced to 38 units, then 30 by early 1978 when the first sets were under construction. Ultimately, 33 units were built between September 1978 and October 1979. The first set was delivered to Birkenhead North depot during September 1978, with the first test run taking place on 9 October 1978.

On 25 October 1978, a Royal Special involving units 507001 and 507002 conveyed The Queen and several other VIPs on a special service between Moorfields and Kirkby. Following the journey, she declared the new-look Merseyrail network officially open. The first passenger working occurred on 1 November 1978, with unit 507001 working the 07:39 Southport-Liverpool Central with a commemorative headboard. It worked between Liverpool and Southport for the remainder of the day, while unit 507002 operated between Liverpool and Ormskirk. Further Class 507 units steadily entered service and the Class 502 was, in turn, withdrawn. By mid-1980, Northern line services were entirely in the hands of the Class 507 and all of the sets were in service by October 1980. A host of new liveries appeared following sectorisation of British Rail.

Following privatisation, the Class 507 units were used interchangeably between both the Northern line and the Wirral line, working a further four routes regularly. The remaining 32 units were refurbished by Alstom Eastleigh during 2002–2005. They received new interiors, CCTV, light clusters dot matrix displays and the 2+3 seating was replaced with 2+2 seats. Unit 507033 was the last Merseyside set to be refurbished, entering service having been named Cllr George Howard in August 2005.

The first of two Class 507 farewell tours took place on 15 September 2024. The second farewell tour took place on 3 November 2024.

The Class 507 was withdrawn on 28 November 2024.

== Description ==
Class 507 units are formed of three cars, and numbered 507001 to 507033. Original plans were drawn up for 47; later 38 Class 507 units to be built, but costs enforced a reduction in the number. Sets are made up of two driving motor cars ('A' DMSO with the compressor; 'B' BDMSO with the battery) and a trailer.

Originally, each three-car set seated 234 passengers, this figure being reduced to 222 following interior modifications during the 1990s. After the introduction of high back seats during refurbishment in 2004/2005 this was reduced to 192 with space for cyclists and disabled people improved.

The Class 507 replaced LMS-designed Class 502 EMUs.

== Operations ==
The Class 507 units operated services on the Merseyrail network. Sets were used interchangeably between the Northern line and the Wirral line from 1997. Between 2023 and 2024 the class was slowly withdrawn from service, being replaced by the Class 777.

== Replacement ==
Merseyrail expected that the Class 507 and 508 units would be withdrawn around 2014 and replaced by a new EMU, but this was postponed following a refurbishment. In May 2012, Merseytravel announced that it had formally begun a project for replacement. The fleet received a refresh package including external re-livery, internal enhancements and engineering work.

In January 2016, Merseytravel announced the short list of companies bidding to build new trains which will replace the Class 507 and 508 on the Merseyrail network. In December 2016, Merseytravel announced that Stadler had won the £460 million contract and that the new Class 777 trains would be delivered from summer 2019 with all the old trains replaced by 2021. The first unit entered service late in January 2023.

== Preservation ==
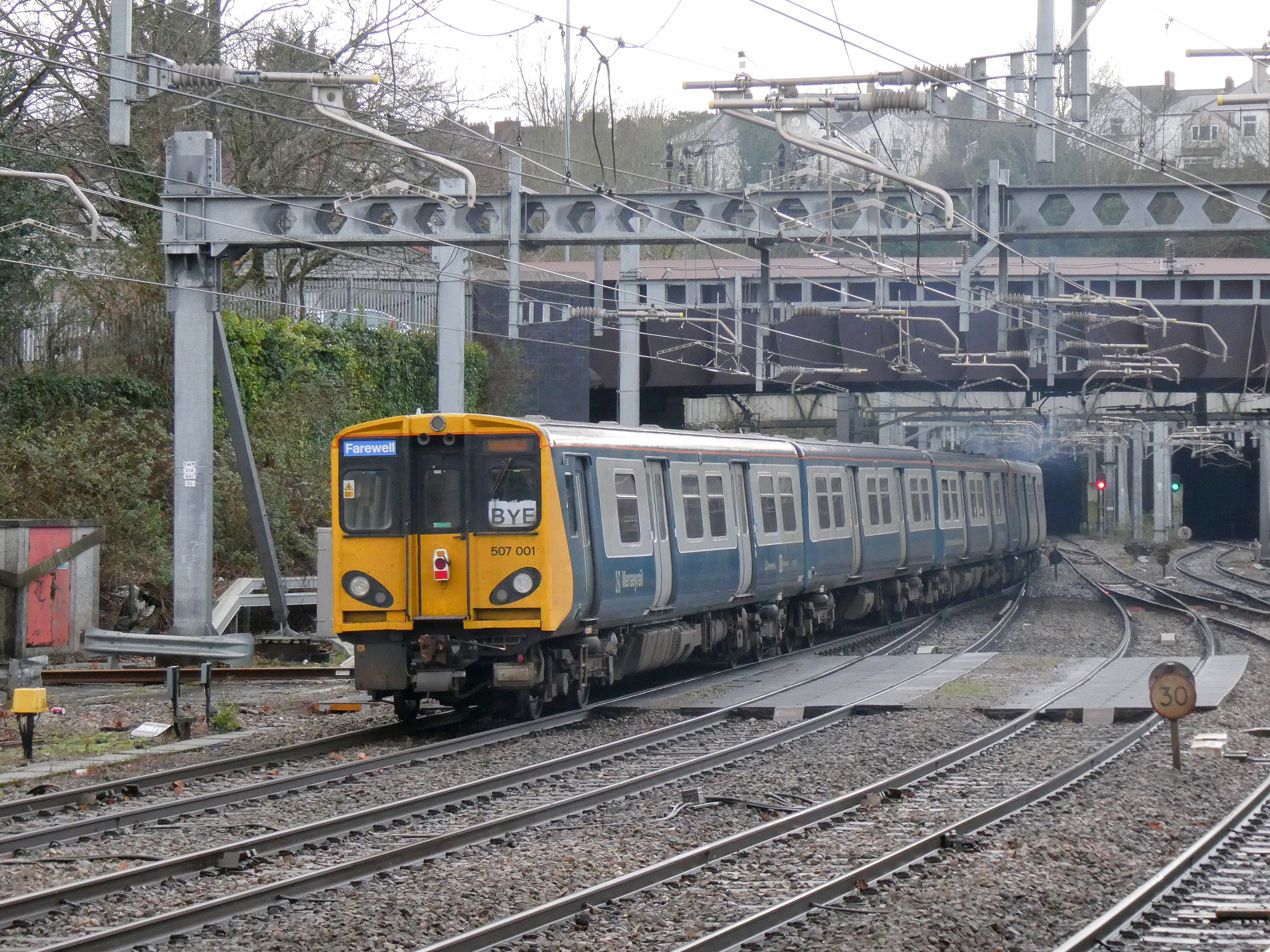
The last Class 507 leaving Newport, Wales, 23 January 2025. The unit nearest the camera (507001) has been preserved; the other unit (507029) was scrapped in Newport.

In March 2024, the Class 507 Preservation Society reached an agreement to preserve 507001 after the chairman of the society bought the unit for £1 from Angel Trains. A crowdfunding campaign to raise £10,000 to move the train by road to the Nant Mawr visitor centre at the Tanat Valley Light Railway was set up by the society in May 2024.

On 23 January 2025, 507001 arrived at Unimetals Newport where it was then taken by road to Alstom's Litchurch Lane Works in Derby, arriving on 27 January 2025 in preparation for its display at Alstom's The Greatest Gathering event in August 2025.

A DMSO coach from 507028 has been placed in the new Merseyside Fire & Rescue Service Training School at Aintree Fire Station.

== Accidents and incidents ==
- Unit 507022 was written off as a result of a serious collision with unit 507004 at Kirkdale TMD on 30 September 1991.
- On 30 June 2009, unit 507002 ran away from Kirkdale TMD under power – but not under the control of a driver – and reached an estimated speed of 30 mph (48 km/h) before being derailed at a set of points that joined the depot to the main line. Following the derailment, the train came to rest blocking the main line at a position where a passenger-carrying train had passed only seconds before. The incident was caused by a failure by depot workers to apply to the train's brakes before isolating the train from the traction current supply when conducting diagnostic testing. When the isolation was subsequently removed, the train's traction supply was re-energised and it proceeded to move under its own power. Merseyrail pleaded guilty to breaching the Health and Safety at Work etc. Act 1974 by failing to ensure that its workers met the required safety standards, and was ordered to pay a fine of £85,000 and legal costs of £20,970.15.
- On 13 March 2021, unit 507006 was the lead unit of a train that overran the buffer stop and derailed at Kirkby station. Twelve people sustained minor injuries and the unit was written-off. The Rail Accident Investigation Branch found that the driver failed to apply the brakes at the appropriate time, due to being distracted.

== Fleet details ==
| Class | Status | Qty. | Year built | Cars per unit | Unit nos. | Sources |
|---|---|---|---|---|---|---|
| 507 | Preserved | 1 | 1978–1980 | 3 | 507001 | |
| 507 | Non-railway use | 2 Vehicles | 1978–1980 | 3 | 507028 (Note: vehicles 64432 and 71369.) | |
| 507 | Scrapped | 32 | 1978–1980 | 3 | 507002–507033, (Note: 1 vehicle of 507028 only.) | |

=== Vehicle numbering ===
Individual vehicles are numbered in the following ranges:

| BDMSO | TSO | DMSO |
|---|---|---|
| 64367–64399 | 71342–71374 | 64405–64437 |

=== Liveries ===
Class 507 units have appeared in a number of liveries:

- British Rail blue and grey, 1978
- Merseyrail – Capital of Culture, 2008–2009; four units with graphics overlaid on the Merseyrail refurbished livery.
- Merseyrail – Good Communications, January 2014–2024; six different designs on a mix of yellow and grey backgrounds.
- Merseyrail – Liverpool Hope University, circa 2010–2024 applied to unit 507002 as promotion for Liverpool Hope University.
- Merseyrail – Heritage (BR Blue and Grey), 2023 onwards; applied to unit 507001 to celebrate 45 years of passenger service.
Class 507 liveries
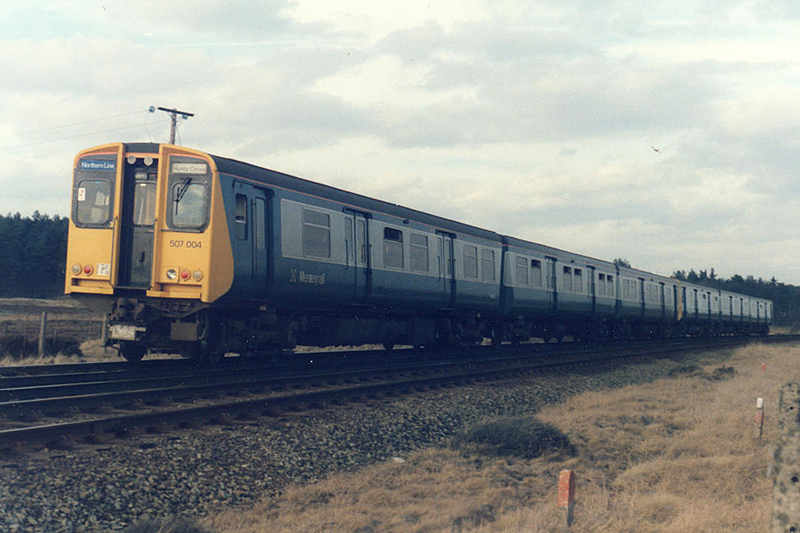
Class 507 in BR blue with Merseyrail logos, 1986

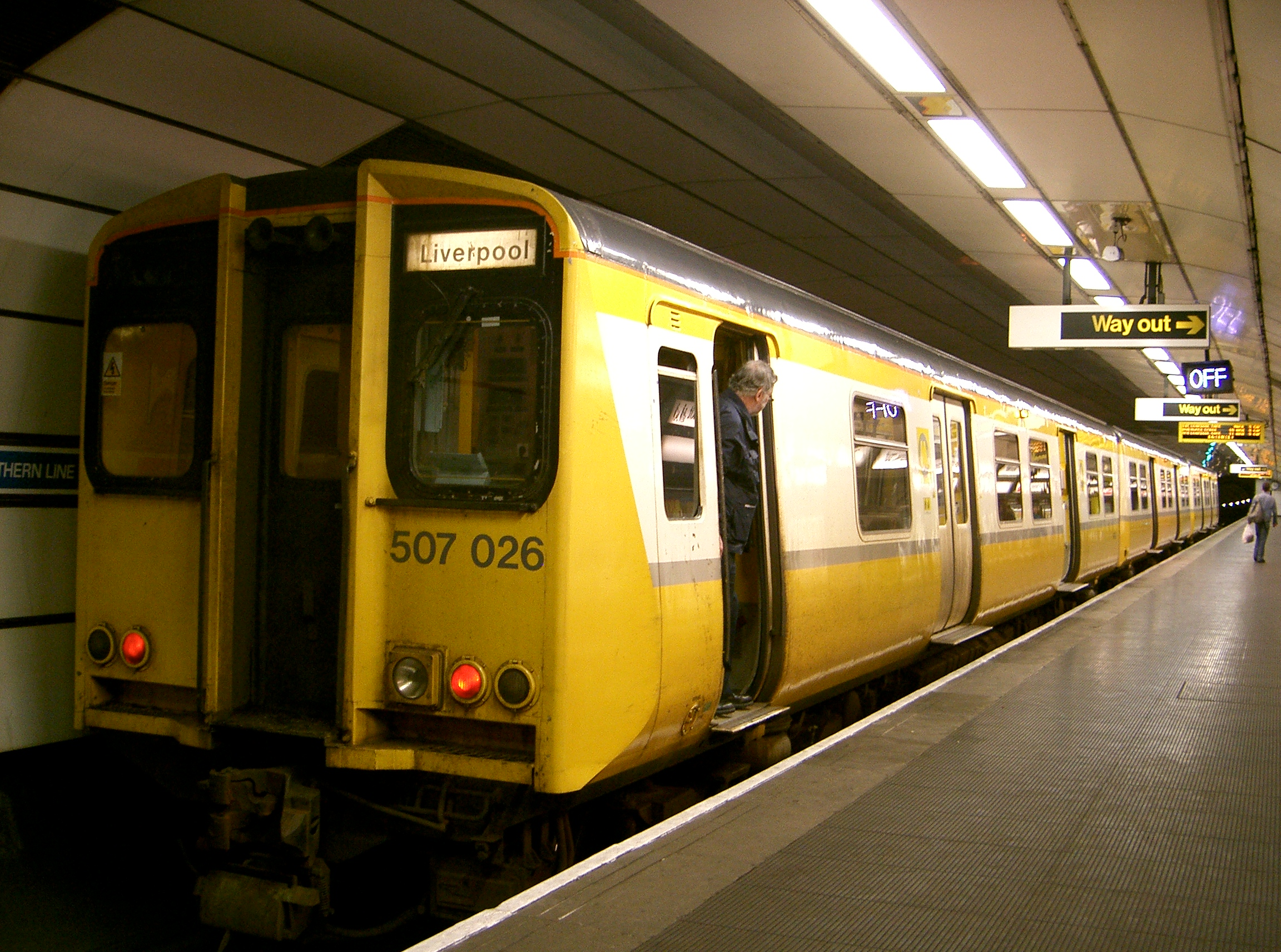
Original Merseyrail livery in 2005

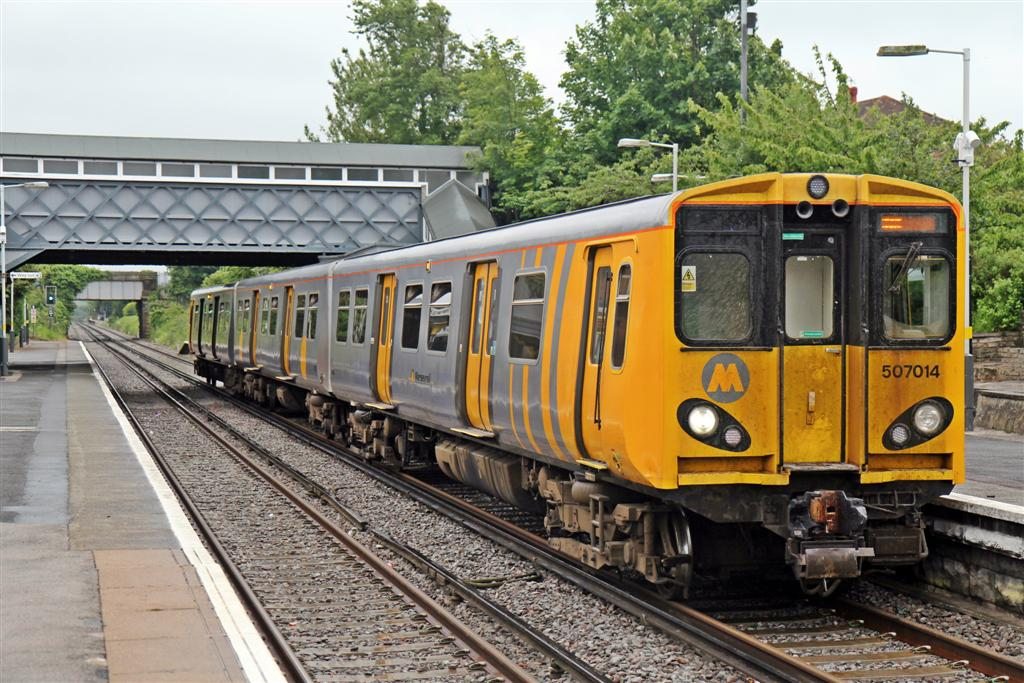
Merseyrail refurbished livery in 2012

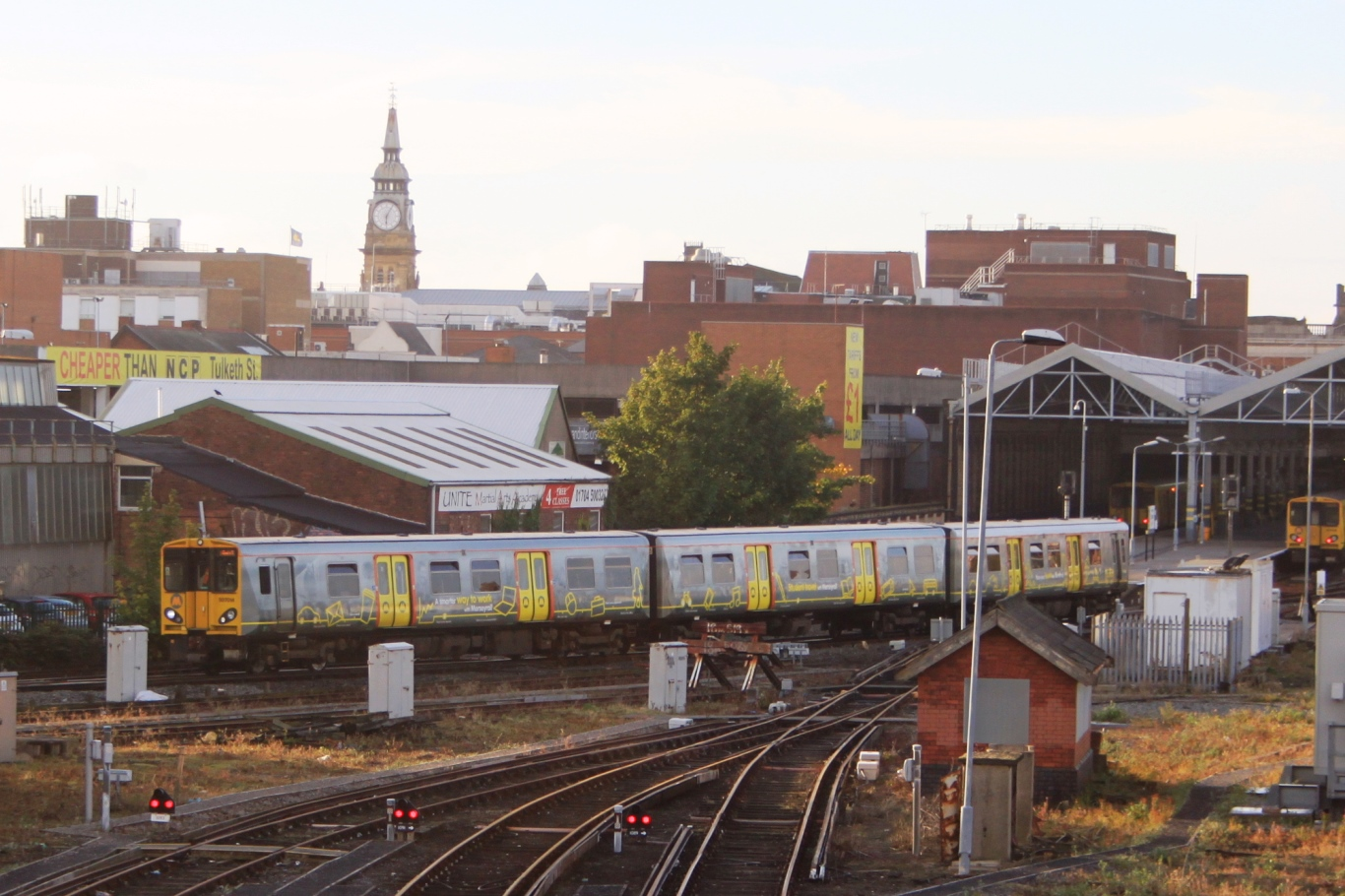
Good Communications grey variant in 2015

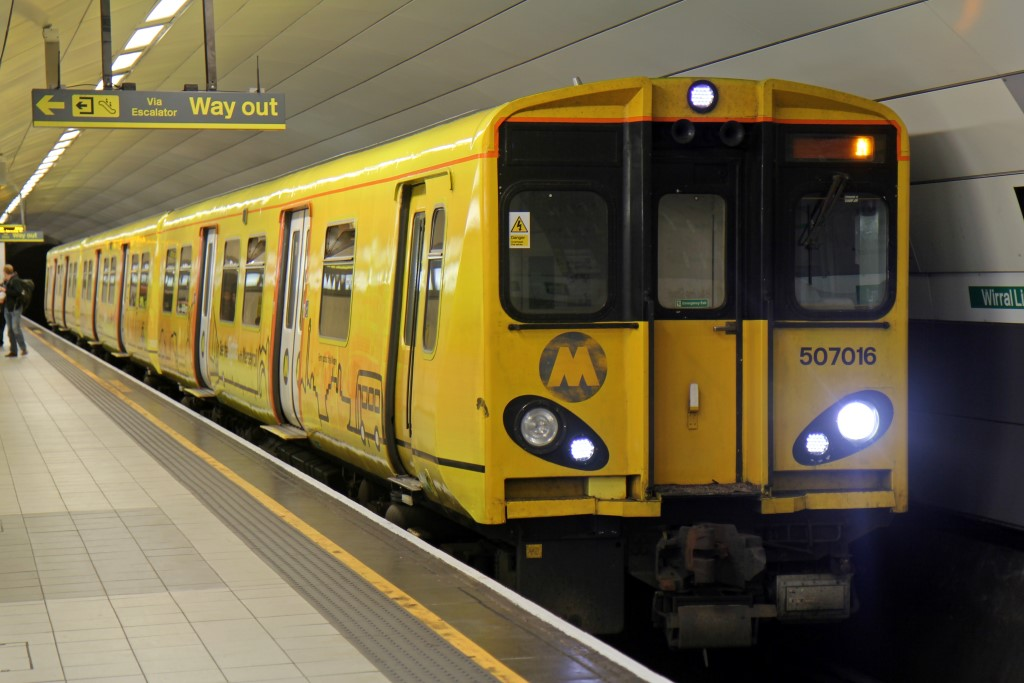
Good Communications yellow variant in 2015

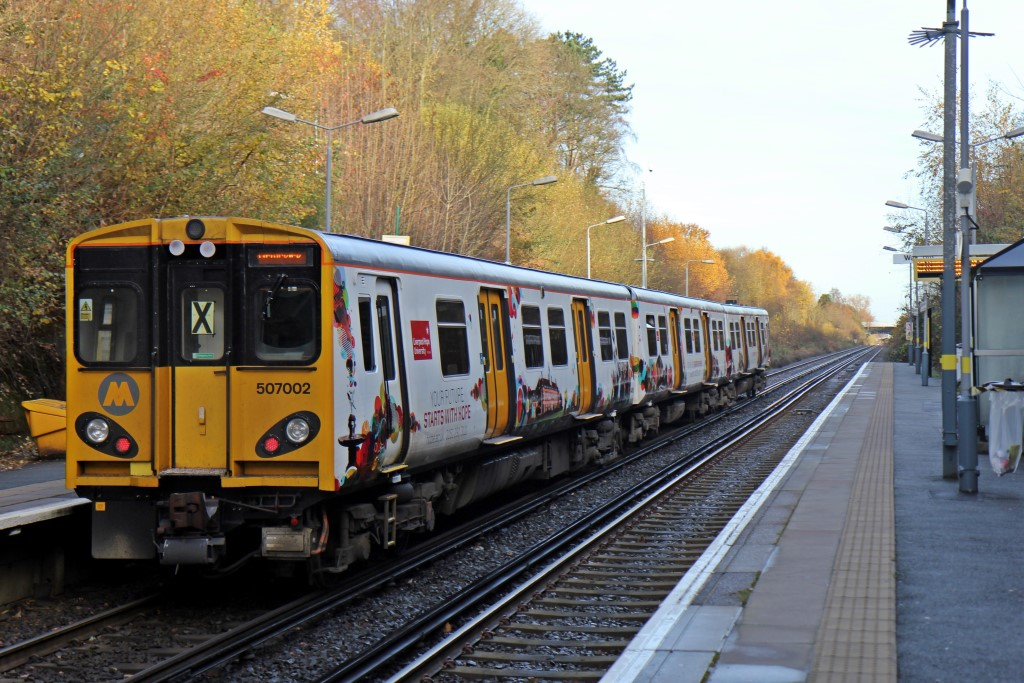
Liverpool Hope University livery in 2013

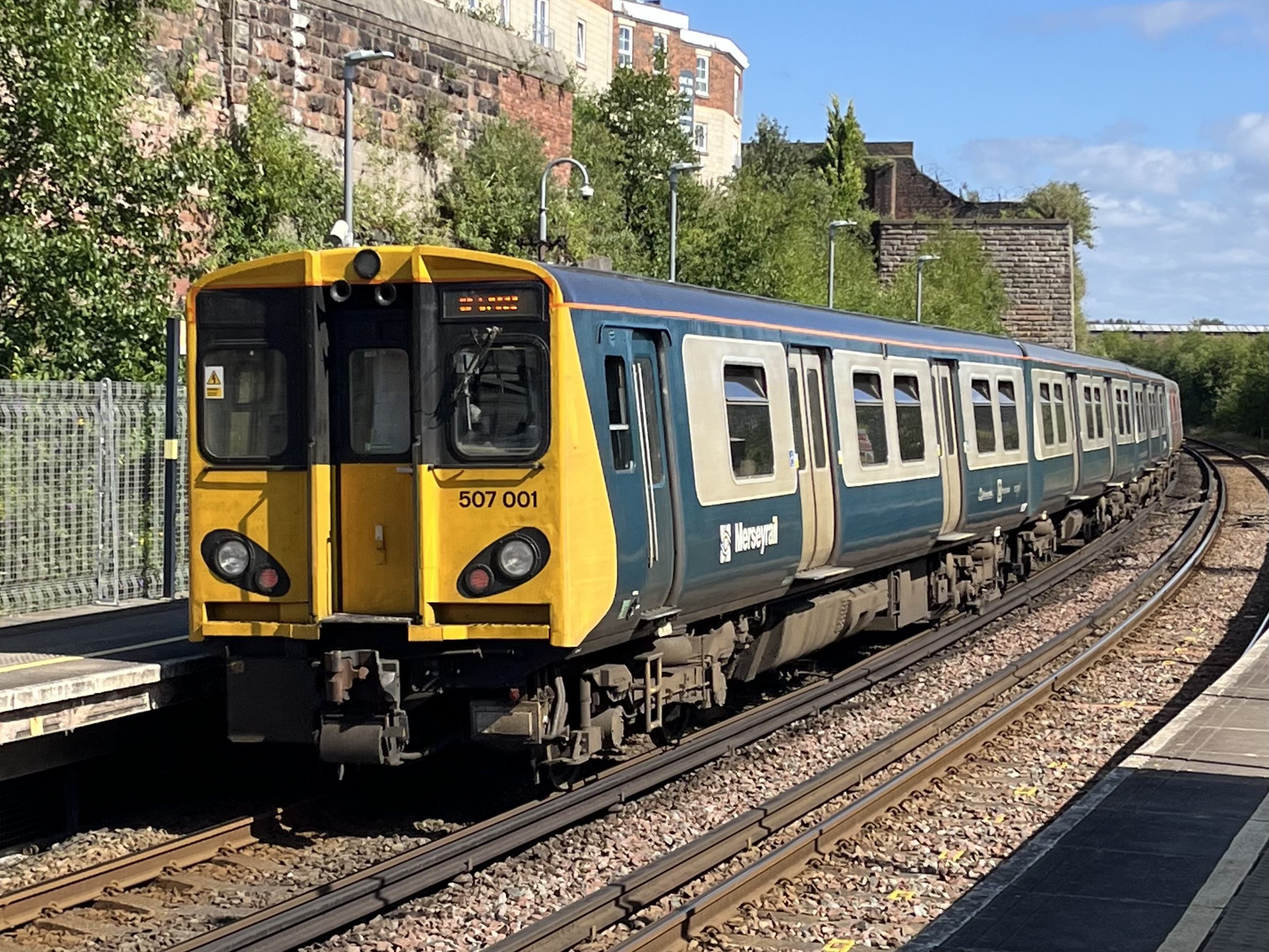
Heritage BR Blue and Grey livery in 2024

=== Named units ===
Named units were as follows:

- 507008 – Harold Wilson
- 507009 – Dixie Dean
- 507016 – Merseyrail – celebrating the first ten years 2003–2013
- 507020 – John Peel
- 507023 – Operations Inspector Stuart Mason
- 507026 – Councillor George Howard
- 507033 – Councillor Jack Spriggs
