= Kirkdale TMD =

Rail depot in Liverpool, England

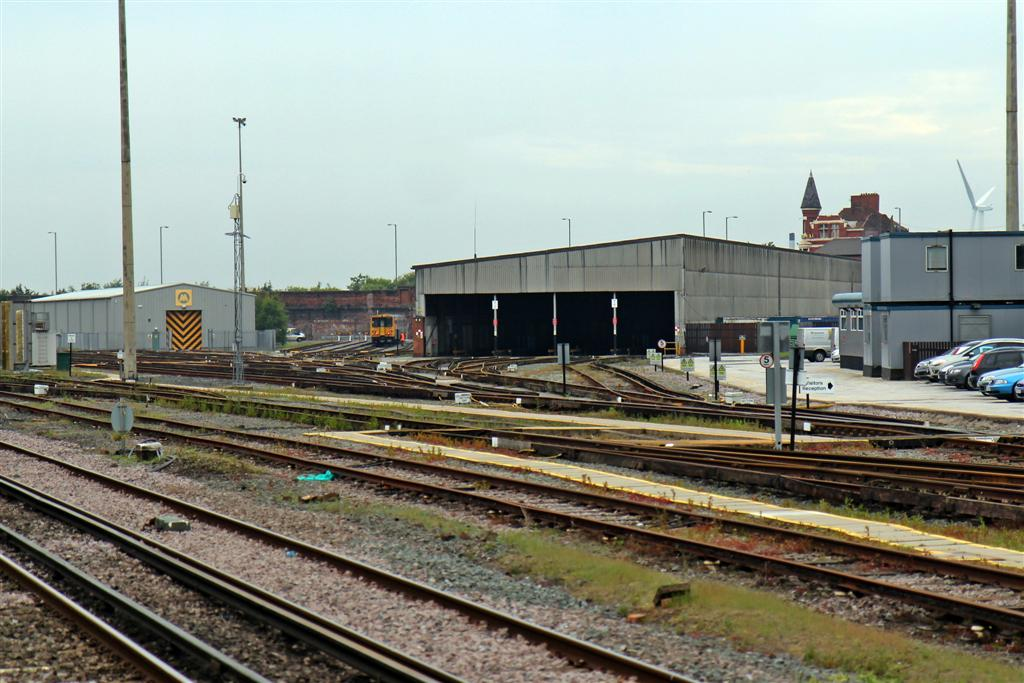
- An overall view of Kirkdale depot.
- Interactive map of Kirkdale TMD

Location
- Location: Kirkdale, Liverpool
- Coordinates: 53.4378°N 2.9852°W
- OS grid: SJ345939

Characteristics
- Owner: Network Rail
- Operator: Merseyrail (1976–2017); Stadler Rail (2017–pres)
- Depot code: KK (1976–pres)
- Type: EMU; BEMU
- Rolling stock: Class 777

History
- Opened: 1976
- Original: British Rail
- Former rolling stock: Class 503 (1938–85); Class 508 (1979–2023); Class 507 (1978–2024)

Kirkdale TMD is a traction maintenance depot located beside Kirkdale railway station in north Liverpool, England. The depot is the largest on the Merseyrail network; it is located on the Northern Line and is used primarily for stabling units, heavy maintenance and cleaning units both internally and externally. It is owned by Network Rail and operated by Stadler.

Operation of Kirkdale depot was transferred from Merseyrail to Stadler Rail Service UK in October 2017. The depot is Stadler Rail's United Kingdom headquarters and the majority of the company's UK workforce will be based at this site. At Kirkdale, Stadler Rail is responsible for their maintenance setup and staff at the Norwich Crown Point maintenance depot, Glasgow Subway and the future Tyne and Wear Metro maintenance and staff. The site was extended and uprated. Work finished on an extensive re-build in November 2019, allowing the depot to become the main maintenance hub for the Class 777 fleet.

== History ==
=== Bank Hall depot ===
The site was originally used for the Bank Hall motive power depot, which closed in 1966. The original depot was adjoined by a large area of sidings with more than thirty roads but, following the cessation of express trains operating to and from Liverpool Exchange station in May 1970, the sidings were rarely used.

=== Rebuild as Kirkdale depot ===
In 1976, when the new Loop and Link tunnels were being constructed to replace the surface station at Liverpool Exchange, the sidings were lifted and transformed into a modern maintenance depot, which was named after the nearby station. A new shed with four roads was constructed, with inspection pits under the tracks. Each road is long enough to house two three-car sets coupled together. A new carriage wash plant was also built so that units could be driven through and cleaned in a very short amount of time. This is the only active washing plant on Merseyrail, with the other washing plant at Birkenhead North being destroyed by consistent vandalism.

In 2006, a brand new wheel lathe was installed at Kirkdale in an area of the depot which was formerly used for the storage of departmental equipment. The commissioning of the new wheel lathe subsequently ended the long running necessity to tow any units requiring wheel turning to the lathe at Allerton depot (located near Liverpool South Parkway) behind a Class 08 diesel shunter, with units transferring from and back to the Merseyrail network via the crossover at Hunts Cross.

=== Second rebuild ===
Merseyrail's fleet of Class 507 and 508 units were replaced by a fleet of Class 777 units built by Stadler Rail at Bussnang, Switzerland. As part of the overall fleet replacement project, which will cost £460 million, both Kirkdale and Birkenhead North depots will be upgraded to a standard which will be capable of maintaining the new trains.

In March 2017, Camberley-based construction company BAM Nuttall announced that they had been successful in winning a £20 million contract to refurbish Birkenhead North and rebuild the depot at Kirkdale. The depot is operated by Stadler Rail Service UK, a subsidiary of the new fleet's manufacturer, and has a driver training simulator, maintenance shed and washing and stabling facilities for up to 30 trains. Construction of the new facilities commenced in October 2017, with work completed by November 2019, in time for the delivery and testing of the new fleet.

== Allocation ==
Currently, Class 777 electric multiple units are based at Kirkdale depot, and regularly stabled in the back sidings near Bank Hall station. In 2006, a new small diesel shunter was allocated to the depot to take sets into the new wheel lathe.
