= Angel Trains =

British rolling stock company

- Type: Private
- Predecessor: British Rail
- Founded: 1994; 32 years ago
- Headquarters: London, England
- Area served: United Kingdom
- Products: Rolling stock leasing
- Owner: AMP Capital Investors (55%); PSP Investments (30%); International Public Partnerships (5%)
- Website: www.angeltrains.co.uk

Angel Trains is a British rolling stock company (ROSCO). Together with Eversholt Rail Group and Porterbrook, it is one of the three original ROSCOs.

Angel Trains was established in March 1994 as part of the privatisation of British Rail. In November 1995, it was bought by Nomura Holdings, Babcock & Brown, and former InterCity manager John Prideaux. By September of the following year, Angel Trains had contracts with 19 of the 25 train operating companies (TOCs) in the UK, and owned approximately 3,755 vehicles. During December 1997, Angel Trains was sold on to the Royal Bank of Scotland, leading to criticism of the firm having been previously undervalued. The firm quickly expanded into the continental European rail leasing business; this international branch of the firm would be split off as Angel Trains International during 2008 and was subsequently rebranded as Alpha Trains.

In addition to its British Rail-era inventory, Angel Trains acquired new rolling stock, such as the Class 390 'Pendolino' electric multiple units (EMUs), which were introduced by Virgin West Coast during the early 2000s. Following another takeover of the business in 2008, at which point it reportedly held over 40 per cent of the railway rolling stock leasing market in Britain, a major restructuring was undertaken. Since the 2010s, Angel Trains has arranged deals involving Hitachi-built high speed bi-mode trains, such as a deal for 19 five-car Class 802 for train operator TransPennine Express (TPE). Angel Trains has also participated in numerous programs to boost its rolling stock's efficiency and environmental credentials, such as converting several vehicles into hybrid diesel and battery-powered trains, as well as hydrogen fuel cells, as well as other initiatives.

== History ==
Angel Trains was established on 21 March 1994 as a subsidiary of British Rail; its creation was one of many preparatory steps involved in the privatisation of British Rail during the 1990s. It was named Angel Trains after the London neighbourhood in which British Rail's offices were located. During November 1995, Angel Trains was sold to a consortium of the Japanese financial services company Nomura Holdings (85%), global investment specialist Babcock & Brown (10%) and former InterCity manager John Prideaux (5%); a private consultancy company owned by Prideaux, Prideaux & Associates, was utilised in this deal.

By September 1996, Angel Trains had contracts in place with 19 of the 25 train operating companies in the UK, and owned approximately 3,755 vehicles, a third of which were less than eight years old at that time. Less than one year after the acquisition, Nomura was already examining options to merge or sell on Angel Trains, or form a joint venture with a train operating company (TOC); it had reportedly encouraged by the recent sale of other ROSCOs, such as Porterbrook to Stagecoach in addition to alleged approaches by unidentified third parties.

During December 1997, Angel Trains was purchased by the financial services group Royal Bank of Scotland in exchange for £395 million. The company had been sold at auction by its previous owners, according to the British newspaper The Independent, the bidding for Angel Trains had been quite vigorous. Around this time, allegations arose that companies such as Angel Trains had been privatised for sums that were far too small by the British Government, which led to an in-depth investigation being conducted by the National Audit Office in addition to separate reviews by regulators.

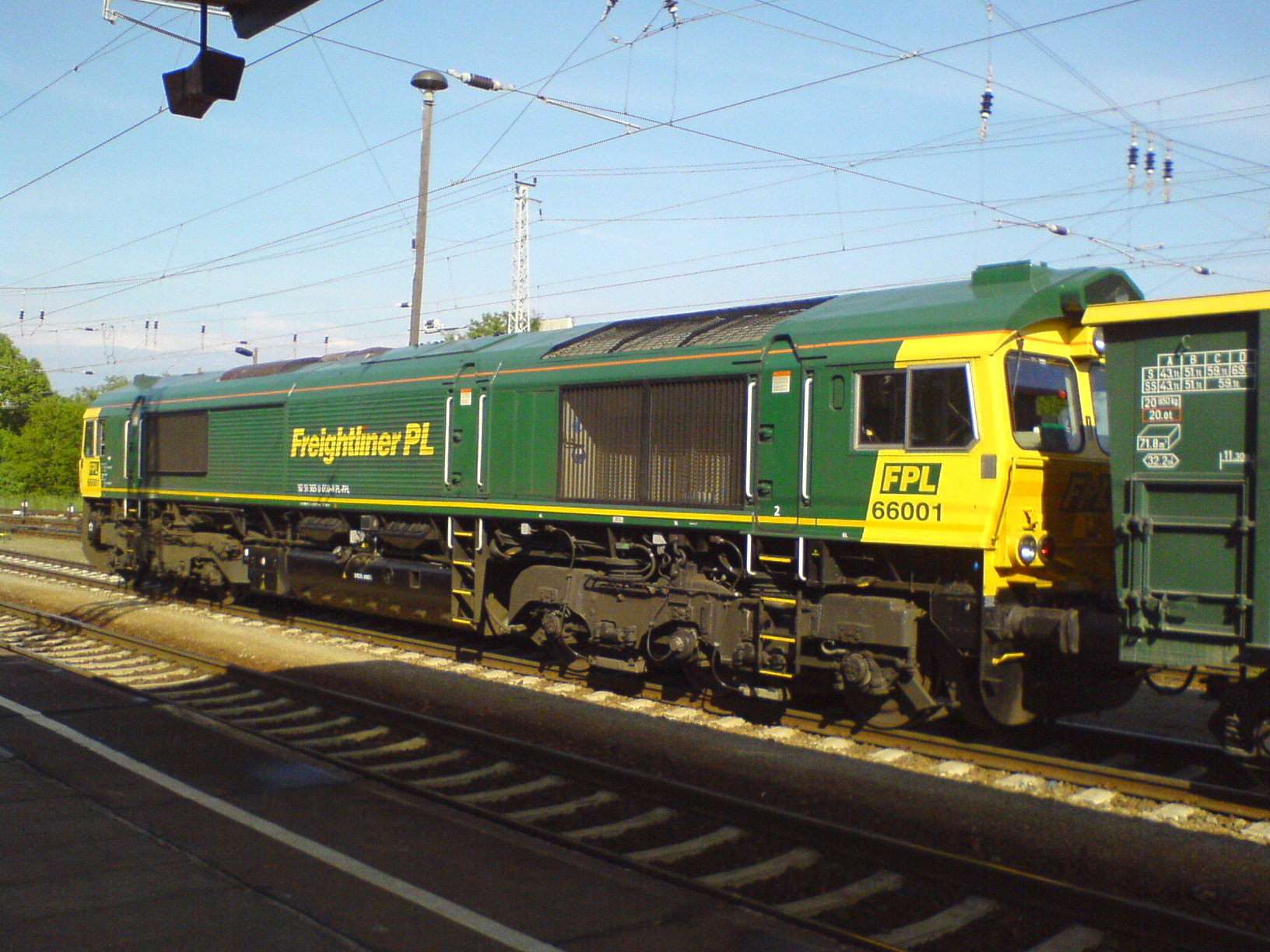
A Freightliner PL EMD JT42CWRM, May 2008

Throughout the late 1990s and into the 2000s, Angel Trains considerably expanded its leasing business, especially in the continental European market. It entered into a joint venture with the German locomotive manufacturer Vossloh, which led to the formation of another leasing company Locomotion Capital, during 2000. Additionally, through investment in its international branches Angel Trains Cargo (leasing freight rolling stock) and Angel Trains Europa (leasing passenger rolling stock), the company became one of the largest rolling stock leasing companies in Europe - specifically in terms of freight locomotives.

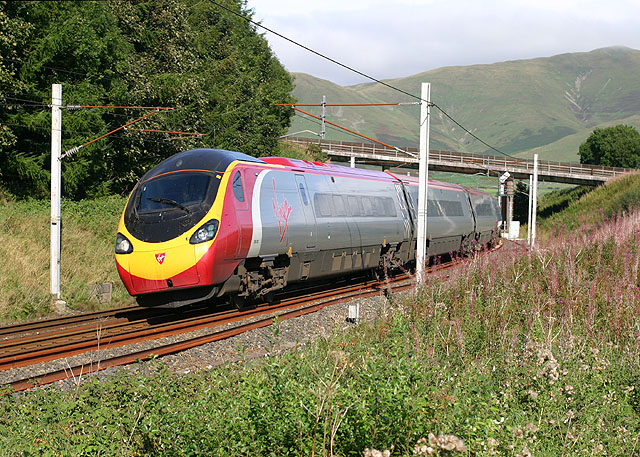
A Virgin Trains Pendolino tilting into one of the many curves on the northern part of the West Coast Main Line

Angel Trains also entered into new leasing arrangements for brand new rolling stock around this time. One high profile example was the Class 390 'Pendolino' electric multiple units (EMUs), the initial order for which comprised 54 nine-car units at a cost of £500 million on behalf of Virgin West Coast. Unusually, these trains featured an active tilt system, designed to provide higher passenger comfort while travelling at speed around curves. Due to a large increase in passenger numbers following the WCML modernisation, the Department for Transport announced the procurement of four additional Class 390s, each with 11 cars, while 31 of the existing trainsets were also lengthened to 11 cars to provide increased capacity.

In June 2008, Angel Trains was acquired by a consortium of Babcock & Brown, AMP Capital, Arcus European Infrastructure Fund and Deutsche Bank at a reported cost of £3.6 billion. Babcock & Brown's head of European infrastructure, Simon Gray, referred to the purchase as "one of the largest acquisitions in Europe in the last few months". At the time, Angel Trains held more than 40 per cent of the railway rolling stock leasing market in Britain.

The 2008 takeover promptly led to a major restructuring of the business' activities; all of its international operations were split out into Angel Trains International, during January 2010, this division was rebranded as Alpha Trains. During 2015, AMP Capital Investors and PSP Investments increased their shareholdings in Angel Trains to 55% and 30% respectively after purchasing the stock formerly owned by Arcus European Infrastructure Fund.

Since the 2010s, Angel Trains has been involved in the supply of Hitachi-built high speed bi-mode trains, such as a deal for 19 five-car Class 802 for train operator TransPennine Express (TPE). Referred to as the Nova 1 by TPE, it was procured under plans to bolster its route capacity by roughly 80%. According to Robin Davis, TPE's Head of New Trains, a major rationale behind the Nova 1 was its bi-mode capability, noting that electrification ambitions often had much uncertainty, while a bi-mode fleet eliminated the operational risk to such uncertainty.

Angel Trains has participated in numerous initiatives to improve the efficiency and environmental credentials of the railways. In September 2018, plans were announced by Angel Trains to convert Class 165 diesel multiple units into hybrid diesel and battery-powered trains. For this scheme, the original diesel-hydraulic drives were replaced by electric drives, the engines charge the batteries, making the drive effectively a hybridized diesel-electric drive; in February 2022, the first trainset was entered service with Chiltern Railways. In February 2020, ScotRail and Angel Trains announced plans to convert a Class 314 EMU, equipping it with hydrogen fuel cells, as a technical demonstration of the feasibility of using hydrogen to fuel trains. In July 2020, Riding Sunbeams formed a consortium that included Angel Trains to power electrified railway lines using 100 per cent renewable energy. During November 2021, it was announced that Hitachi Rail and Angel Trains would trial the use of battery power on hybrid high speed trains in order to reduce fuel consumption.

By June 2019, Angel Trains' inventory of rolling stock reportedly totalled 4,421 vehicles.

== Initial fleet ==
The fleet Angel Trains inherited from British Rail in 1994 comprised:

Class	Number of carriages
First generation	137
43	115
142	190
150	146
153	30
156	124
165	180
166	63
303	144
305	75
308	63
312	180
314	48
317	288
421	332
423	264
442	120
465	200
507	96
508	93
Mark 3 coaches	416
