= British Rail Class 508 =

Class of electric multiple unit train

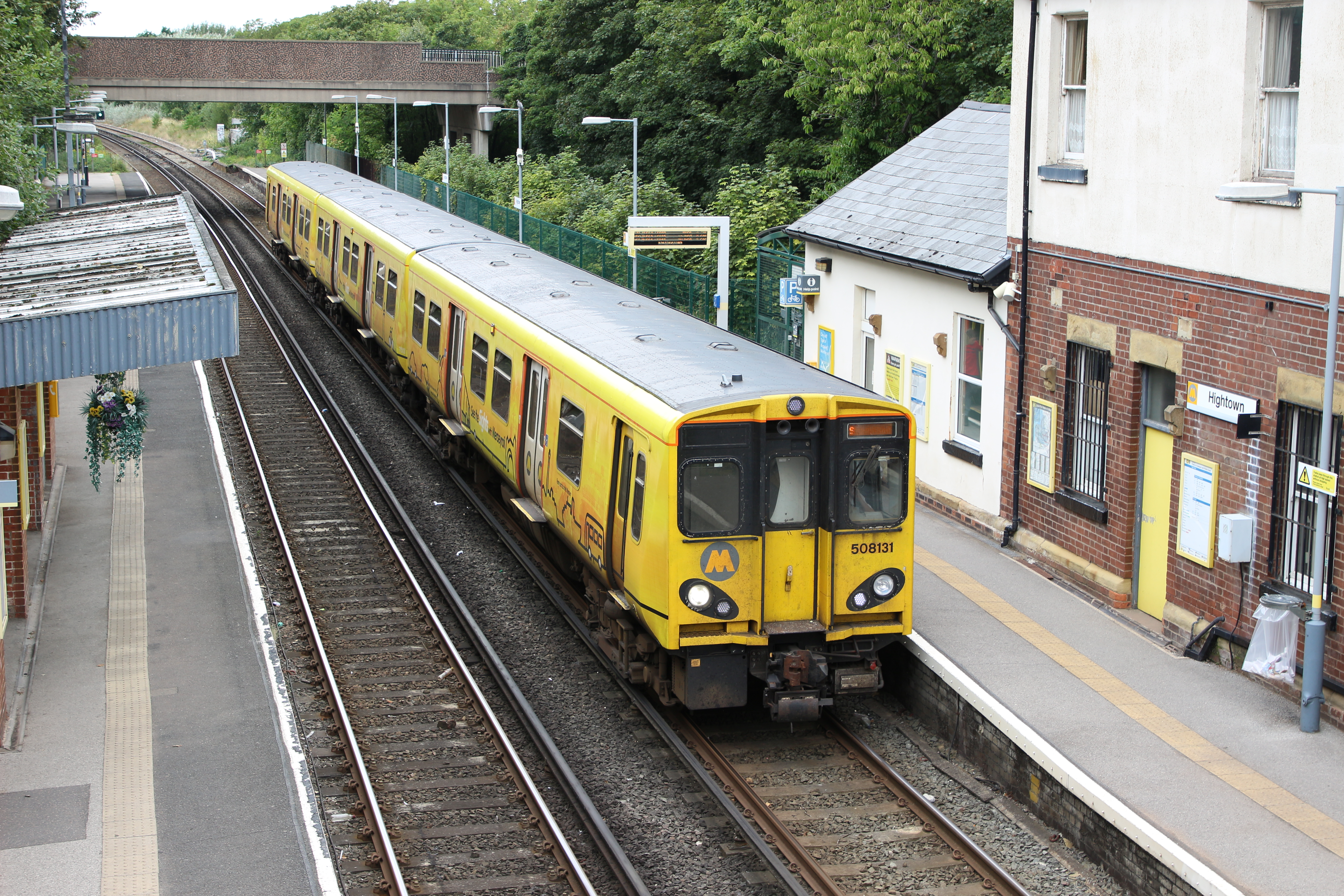
- Merseyrail Class 508 at Hightown

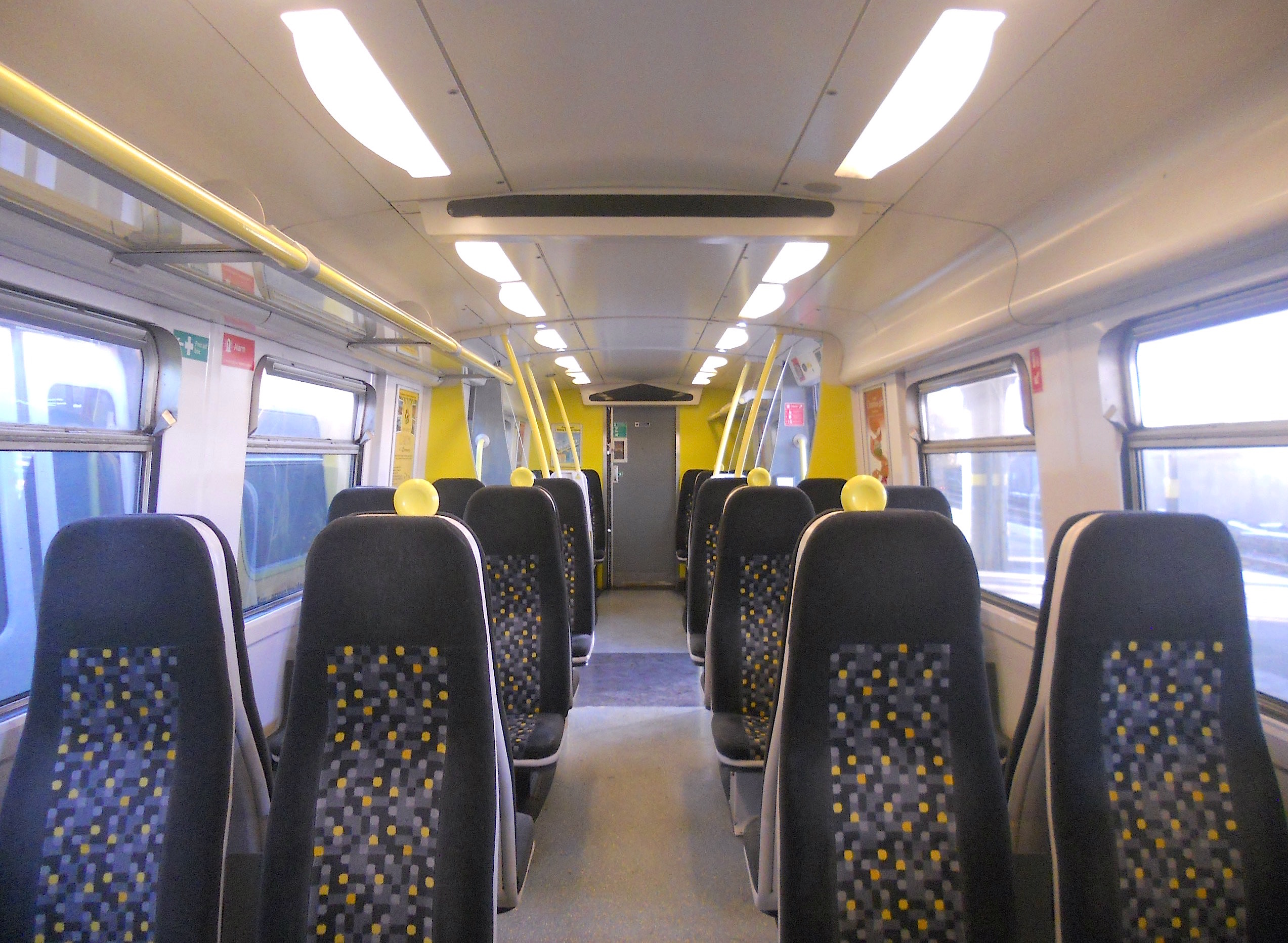
- The interior of a Merseyrail-refurbished Class 508 unit
- Stock type: Electric multiple unit
- In service: 17 December 1979–16 January 2024
- Manufacturer: British Rail Engineering Limited
- Order nos.: 30979 (DMSO vehicles); 30980 (TSO vehicles); 30981 (BDMSO vehicles)
- Built at: Holgate Road Works, York
- Family name: BREL 1972
- Replaced: Class 503
- Constructed: 1979–1980
- Refurbished: 2002–2004 at Alstom, Eastleigh Works (27 Merseyrail units only); 2007–2008 at Wabtec Doncaster (6 Southeastern units only)
- Number built: 43
- Number preserved: 0 (driving trailer 508 one unit only)
- Number scrapped: 41
- Successor: Class 378 (London Overground); Class 466 (Southeastern); Class 777 (Merseyrail)
- Formation: As built, 4 cars per unit: DMSO-TSO-TSO-BDMSO; After 3-car conversion: DMSO-TSO-BDMSO
- Diagram: DMSO vehicles: EA208; TSO vehicles: EH218; BDMSO vehicles: EI203
- Design code: 4PER
- Fleet numbers: 508/0: 508001–508043; 508/1: 508101–508143; 508/2: 508201–508212
- Capacity: As built: 320 seats; As three-car: 234 seats; Three-car modified: 222 seats; 508/2 units: 219 seats; As refurbished: 192 seats
- Owner: Angel Trains
- Operators: British Rail; Connex South Eastern; London Overground; South Eastern Trains; Merseyrail; Southeastern; Silverlink
- Depots: Birkenhead North (Wirral); Gillingham (Kent); Hall Road (Blundellsands); Kirkdale (Liverpool)
- Lines served: Wirral line; Northern line

Specifications
- Car body construction: Steel underframe and body frame, aluminium body and roof
- Car length: DM vehs.: 19.800 m (64 ft 11.5 in); Trailers: 19.920 m (65 ft 4.3 in)
- Width: 2,820 mm (9 ft 3 in)
- Height: 3,582 mm (11 ft 9.0 in)
- Floor height: 1,146 mm (3 ft 9.1 in)
- Doors: Double-leaf pocket sliding, each 1,288 mm (4 ft 2.7 in) wide (2 per side per car)
- Wheelbase: Over bogie centres: 14.170 m (46 ft 5.9 in)
- Maximum speed: 75 mph (120 km/h)
- Weight: DMSO vehicles: 36.15 t (35.58 LT; 39.85 ST); TSO vehicles: 26.72 t (26.30 LT; 29.45 ST); BDMSO vehicles: 36.61 t (36.03 LT; 40.36 ST)
- Traction motors: 8 × GEC G310AZ; or 8 × Brush TM61-53; (82 kW (110 hp) each, 4 per motor car)
- Power output: 656 kW (880 hp)
- HVAC: Electric heating (ducted warm air)
- Electric systems: 750–850 V DC third rail
- Current collection: Contact shoe
- UIC classification: Bo′Bo′+2′2′+Bo′Bo′
- Bogies: BREL BX1
- Minimum turning radius: 70.4 m (231 ft 0 in)
- Braking systems: Electro-pneumatic (disc) and rheostatic
- Safety systems: AWS; TPWS
- Coupling system: Tightlock
- Multiple working: 508/3: within subclass, and with Class 313; Others: within class, and with Class 507
- Seating: Transverse
- Track gauge: 1,435 mm (4 ft 8 1/2 in) standard gauge

Notes/references
- Specifications as at August 1982 except where otherwise noted. The additional TSO vehicles, removed as part of three-car conversion, were inserted into Class 455/7 units.

The British Rail Class 508 (4PER) electric multiple unit (EMU) passenger trains were built by British Rail Engineering Limited, at Holgate Road carriage works, York, in 1979 and 1980. They were a variant of British Rail's standard 1972 design for suburban EMUs, eventually encompassing 755 vehicles and five classes (313/314/315/507/508). They mostly worked on the Merseyrail network from 1982 until withdrawal on 16 January 2024.

== Description ==
The class was developed for Merseyside, following extensive trials and testing of the 4PEP/2PEP stock that was built in the early 1970s. Testing of Class 313 took place on the Northern line on Merseyside, using 313013/063 which were loaned from the Great Northern Line of the Eastern Region to Hall Road TMD. Original plans were drawn up for 58 Class 508s to be constructed, although costing issues limited the eventual number to 43. Following planning and building, British Rail diverted the 508s to work alongside much older first-generation 4SUB EMUs on suburban services out of London Waterloo. The first unit was delivered to Strawberry Hill depot on 9 August 1979. Based at Wimbledon Traincare Depot, they soon became problematic due to their non-standard dimensions and brake problems caused by leaf fall.

Once a new build of Class 455 EMUs was completed, the Class 508s were sent slowly to their originally intended home on the Merseyrail network. Driver training began at Kirkdale TMD on 17 February 1982 and the first Class 508 began service on the Northern line the following month. The first Wirral line service commenced on 8 June 1984 and the Class 508s had completely displaced the Class 503 fleet by the end of March 1985. The fleet was then working in parallel with the already well-established fleet of Class 507 EMUs across the River Mersey, which had been working on Merseyside since 1978.

== Operations ==
=== Silverlink/London Overground ===
Silverlink leased three 508/0s in 2003 for operation on the Watford DC Line to assist its fleet of Class 313 EMUs. They were modified to make them inter-operable with 313s and were reclassified as Class 508/3. These were withdrawn following the delivery of Class 378 Capitalstar units, and the 508/3s were scrapped in 2013.

=== Merseyrail ===
In the late 1980s under British Rail, the entire class of 43 units operated on the Merseyrail network, By 2010, the number operated by Merseyrail had been reduced to 27 units. and were primarily maintained at Birkenhead North TMD, with minor maintenance being undertaken at Kirkdale TMD.

A farewell tour for the Class 508 operated using units 508139 and 508141 took place on 29 October 2023, and the class was withdrawn from service on 16 January 2024.

=== Southeastern ===
Connex South Eastern leased twelve Class 508s freed up by capacity reductions on Merseyrail services in 1996, for operation on specific Kent services that would replace slam-door 4CEP units. They were refurbished at Eastleigh Works, including the installation of 2+2 seating and wheel-in cycle racks in the centre cars, and reclassified as the Class 508/2 (508201-212). Their main duties included London Bridge to Tunbridge Wells, Paddock Wood to Strood, Maidstone West to Three Bridges and Sittingbourne to Sheerness-on-Sea, as well as Grove Park to Bromley North for a short period. Units were based at Gillingham Depot.

Due to their comfort and ride quality, alongside the lack of toilets and first class facilities, which were felt as a downgrade from the slam-door units they replaced, the Class 508s were unpopular with passengers. In 2005, one unit was refurbished by interim operator South Eastern Trains to improve external appearances, with a black, white and yellow livery.

== Replacement ==
=== Southeastern ===
In September 2006 new operator Southeastern announced that a cascade of rolling stock would see Class 466 units replace the 508s on the Sheerness and Medway Valley lines in the December 2006 timetable. Following this timetable change, the fleet's diagrams were reduced to six serviceable units, resulting in five sets being placed in "warm store" at Chart Leacon TMD, and one unit was cannibalised. With the transfer of the Tonbridge to London via Redhill services to Southern, Southeastern placed its remaining Class 508 units in store in December 2008.

Network Rail's Route Utilisation Strategy for Merseyside has called for an expansion to Merseyrail's current fleet to allow for both additional services and lengthening of trains to six cars. In December 2009 it was reported by various sources that the former Southeastern and London Overground units would be transferred to Merseyrail.

=== Merseyrail ===
In May 2012, Merseytravel announced that it was beginning a project for replacement of the Class 508 and 507. The lease on the Class 507s and 508s had been extended to 2018. As part of the agreement with Angel Trains, the fleet received a refresh package including external re-livery, internal enhancements and engineering work.

In January 2016, Merseytravel announced the short list of companies bidding to build new trains which will replace the Class 507 and Class 508s on the Merseyrail network. In December 2016, Merseytravel announced that Stadler had won the £460 million contract and that the new Class 777 trains were to be delivered from summer 2019 with all the old trains replaced by 2021. The first unit entered service late in January 2023.

The last Class 508 unit was sent for scrap in February 2024.

== Accidents and incidents ==
- On 21 April 1982, unit 508031 was running the 06:34 service from London Waterloo crashed at Shepperton, demolishing barriers and a wall. The train also slid into some new pedestrian crossing lights, rendering them unusable. The crash was initially believed to be the result of braking tests the previous night, which involved applying grease to the tracks, and that the grease may not have been sufficiently cleaned off. It was later found that the train's brakes were faulty.
- On 26 October 2005, unit 508124, forming 2W43 17:06 West Kirby return via Liverpool Lime Street, derailed 200 m (660 ft) short of Liverpool Central, caused by track gauge widening due to poor track condition. There were no serious injuries. The RAIB report cited incompatibility between Class 508 (and 507) EMUs and the Liverpool Loop track as a causal factor, along with maintenance and other track design concerns.
- On 6 March 2007, a Class 508/3 unit, forming the 05:00 Tonbridge to Gatwick Airport, derailed near Crowhurst, Surrey, after hitting a fallen tree on the line. None of the eight people on board were hurt.

== Fleet details ==
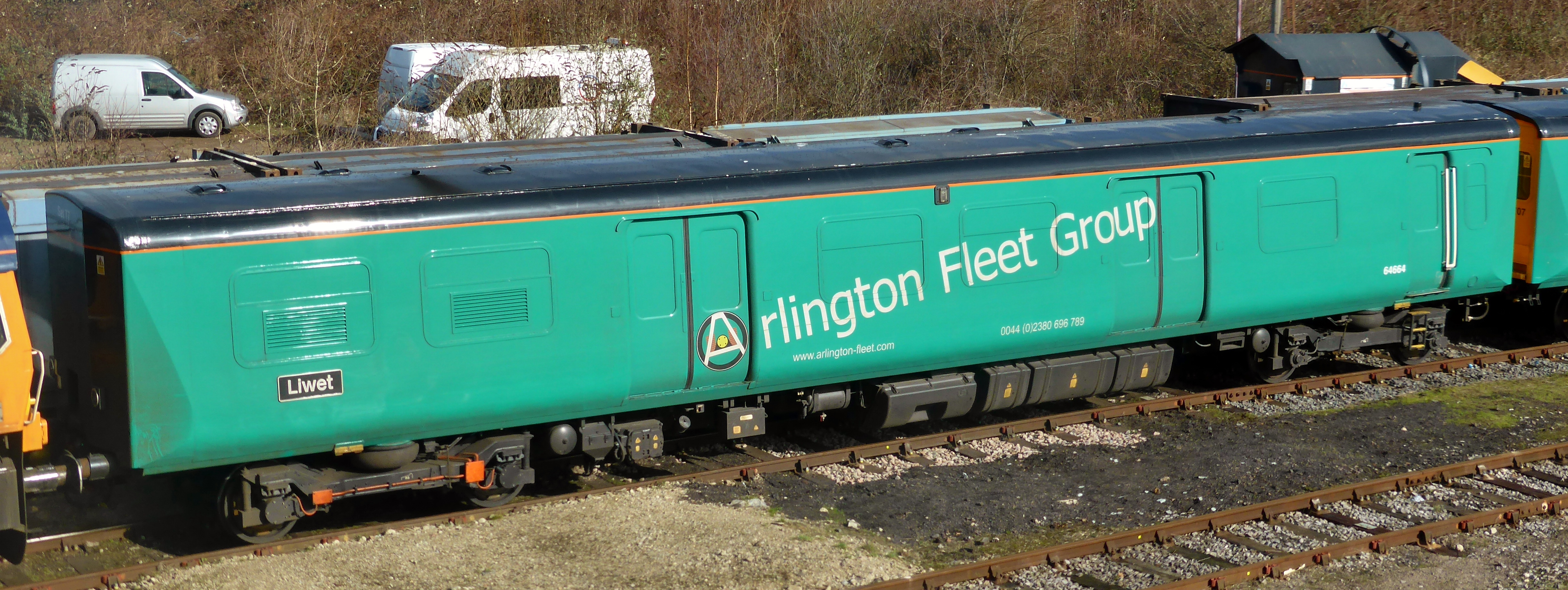
A Class 508 DMSO vehicle converted for use as a translator coach

Class	Operator	Status	Qty.	Year built	Cars per unit	Unit nos.	Year converted
508/1	Merseyrail	Scrapped	28	1979–1980	3	508103-508104, 508108, 508110-508112, 508114-508115, 508117-508118, 508120, 508122-508128, 508130-508131, 508134, 508136-508141, 508143	From 508/0 in 1984-85
508/2	Connex South Eastern	Scrapped	10	1979–1980	3	508201–508206, 508208–508211 (Note: Trailer vehicle 64649 from 508201 and trailer vehicle 74712 from 508209, are at the Emergency Services Training Centre Seacombe.)	From 508/1 in 1998
508/2	Connex South Eastern	Scrapped	2	1979–1980	3	508207, (Note: Trailer vehicles 64664 and 64707 were converted for use Trains as translator coaches.) 508212 (Note: At the Fire Service College, Moreton-in-Marsh.)	From 508/1 in 1998
508/3	Silverlink	Scrapped	3	1979–1980	3	508301–508303	From 508/1 in 2002-03

=== Vehicle numbering ===
Individual vehicles were numbered in the following ranges:

DMSO	TSO	BDMSO
64649–64691	71483–71525	64692–64734

The TSO vehicles transferred into the Class 455/7 fleet were numbered in the range 71526–71568.

=== Liveries ===
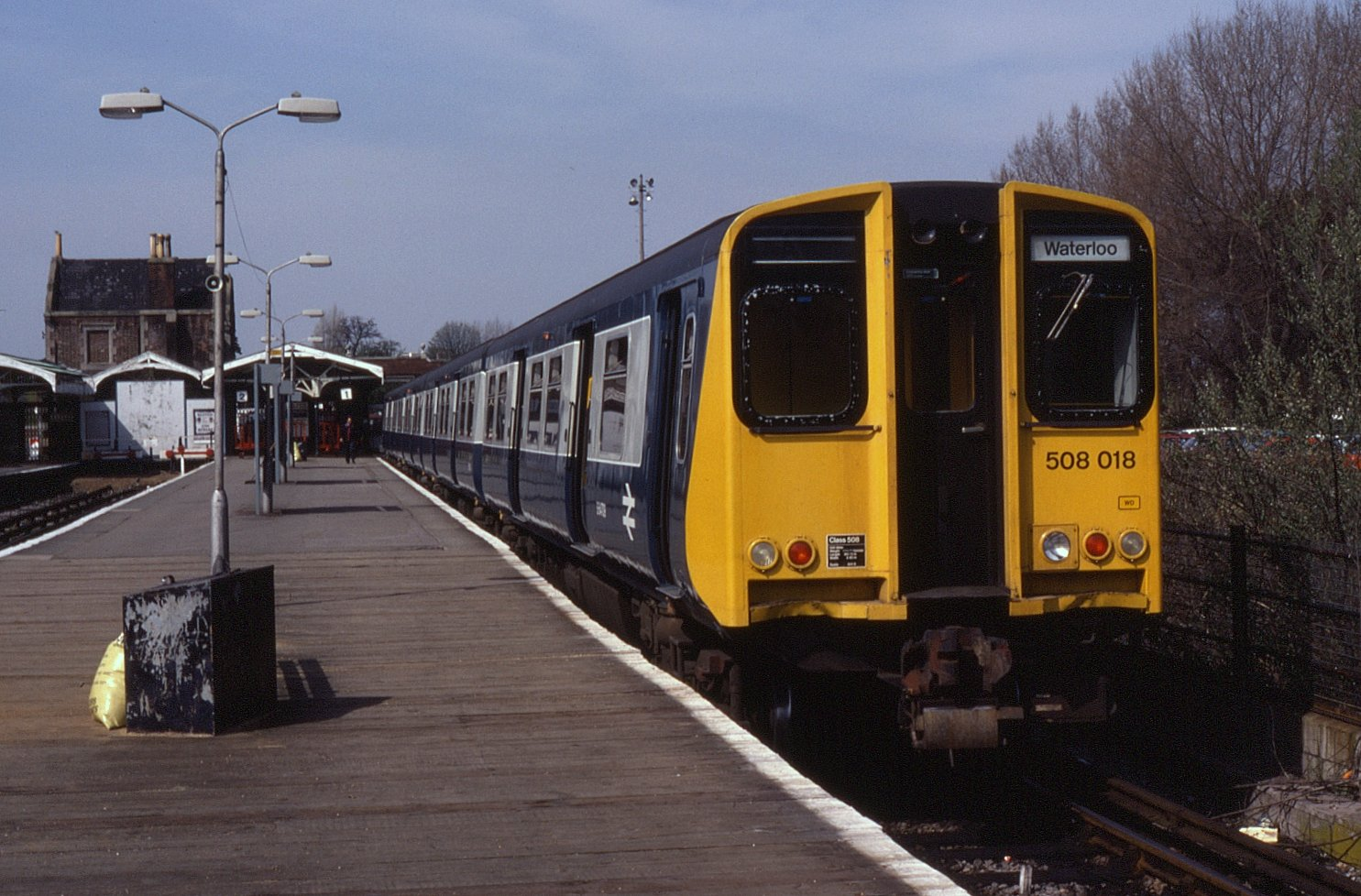
A Class 508 in as-delivered BR livery at Hampton Court, near London, in 1984.

Class 508 units appeared in a large number of liveries:

- Merseyrail refurbished, 2003–2015; silver, with vertical curved yellow stripes at the cab ends, and yellow passenger doors.
- Silverlink Metro, 2003–2007; purple, green and yellow, applied when they were modified in 2003. Adhesive labels marked "London Overground" were applied when the fleet was transferred to that operator.
- South Eastern Trains, 2005–2006; white and grey with a black window band and yellow doors.
- Southeastern, 2006–2008; white and grey with a black window band and lilac/blue doors, similar to that carried by the Class 465/466 fleet.
- Merseyrail – Capital of Culture, 2008–2009; four units with graphics overlaid on the Merseyrail refurbished livery.
- Merseyrail – The Beatles Story, October 2011–2023 (508111 only); text and graphics on a blue background advertising The Beatles Story exhibition at the Albert Dock in Liverpool.
- Merseyrail – Good Communications, January 2014–2024; six different designs on a mix of yellow and grey backgrounds.
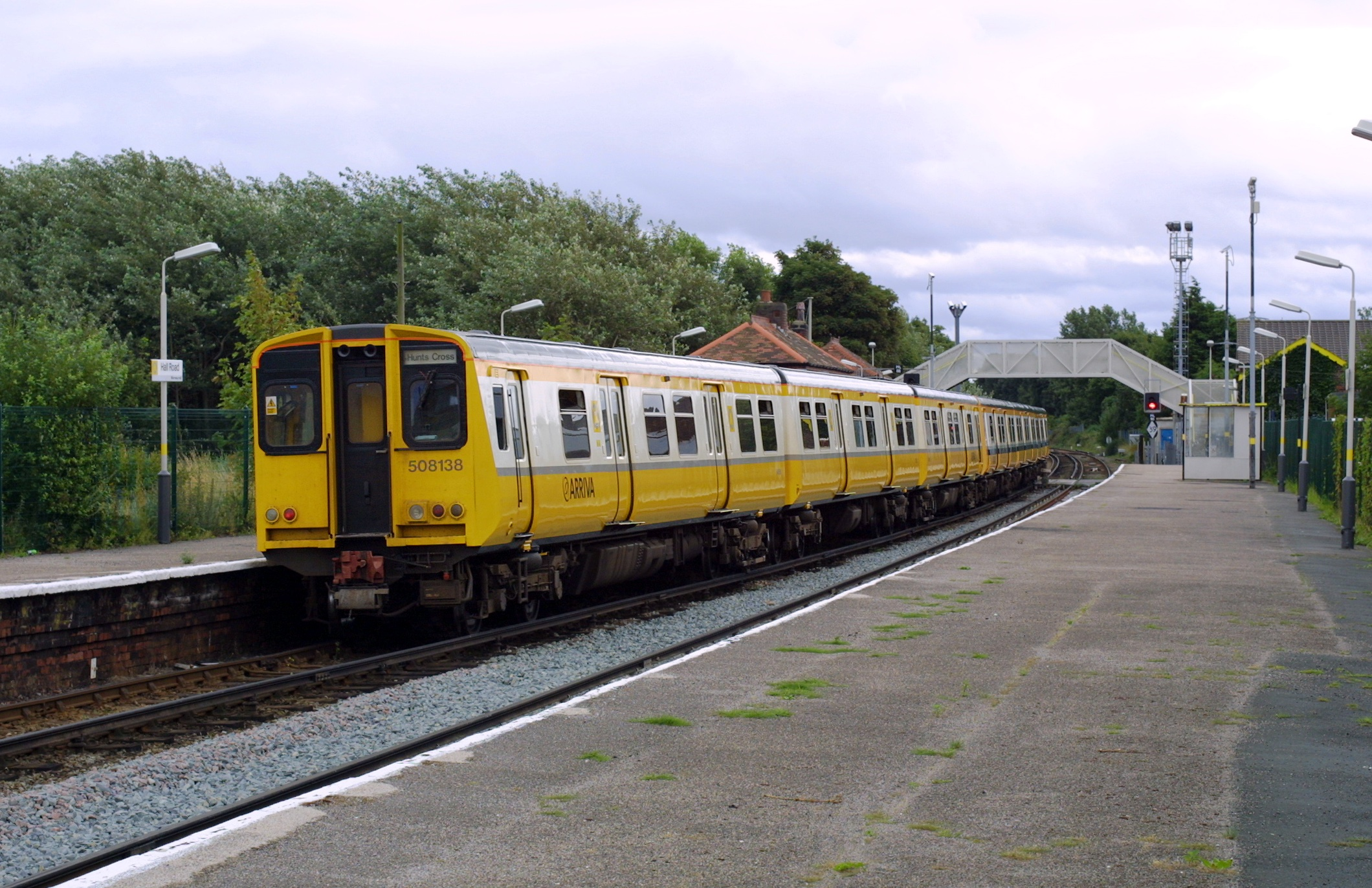
Original Merseyrail livery in 2001

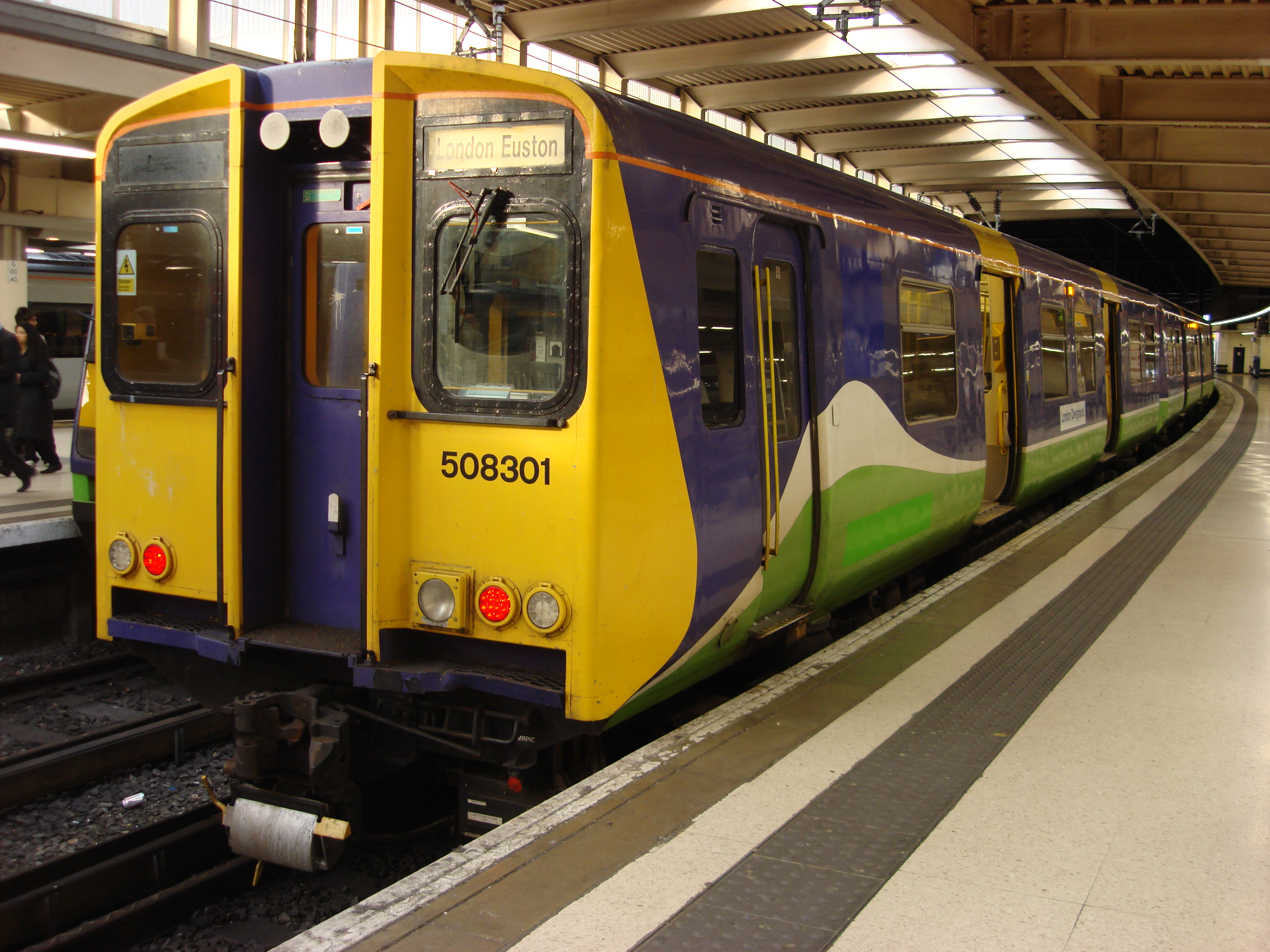
Silverlink livery in 2007, with Overground labelling.

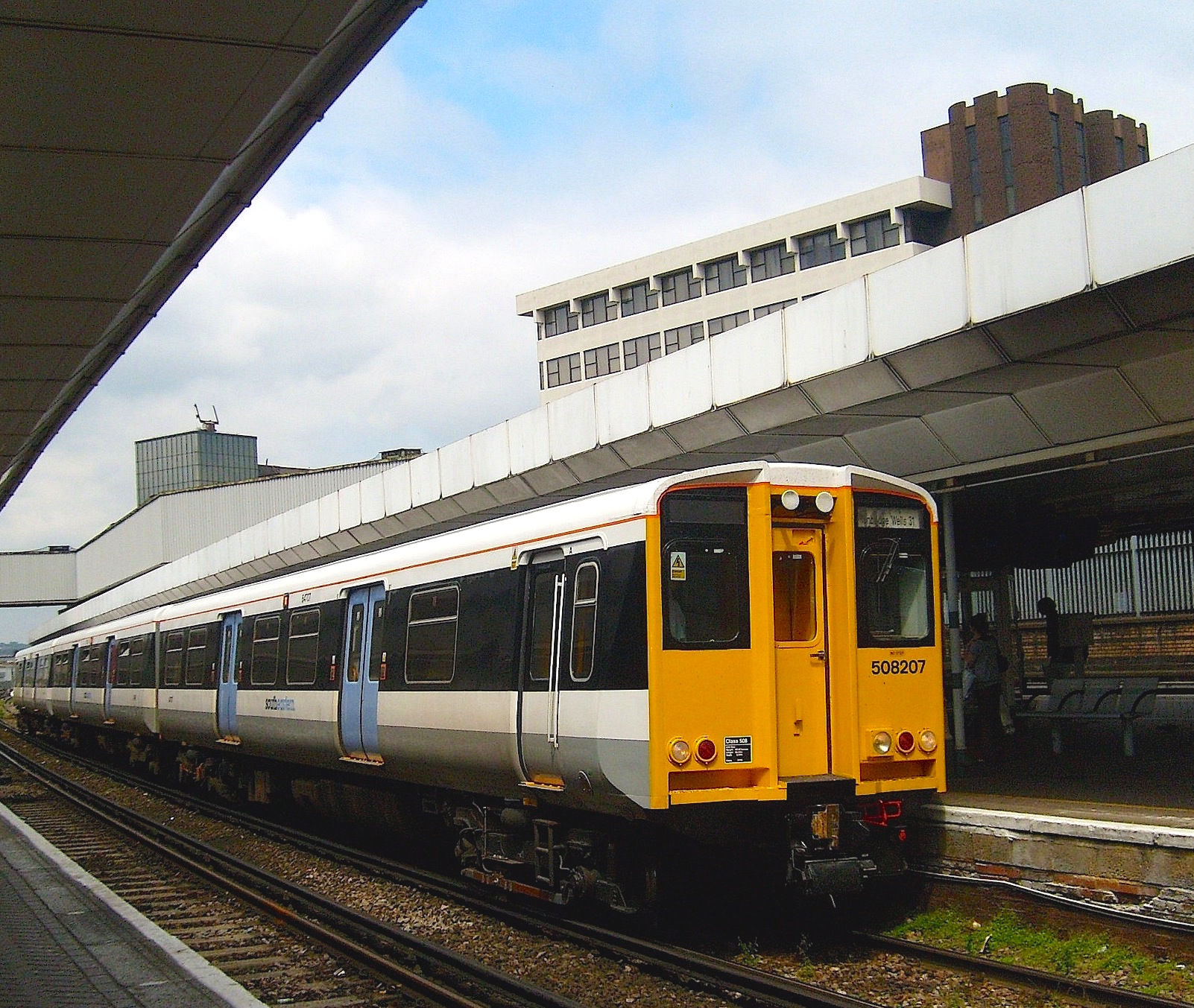
Southeastern livery in 2007

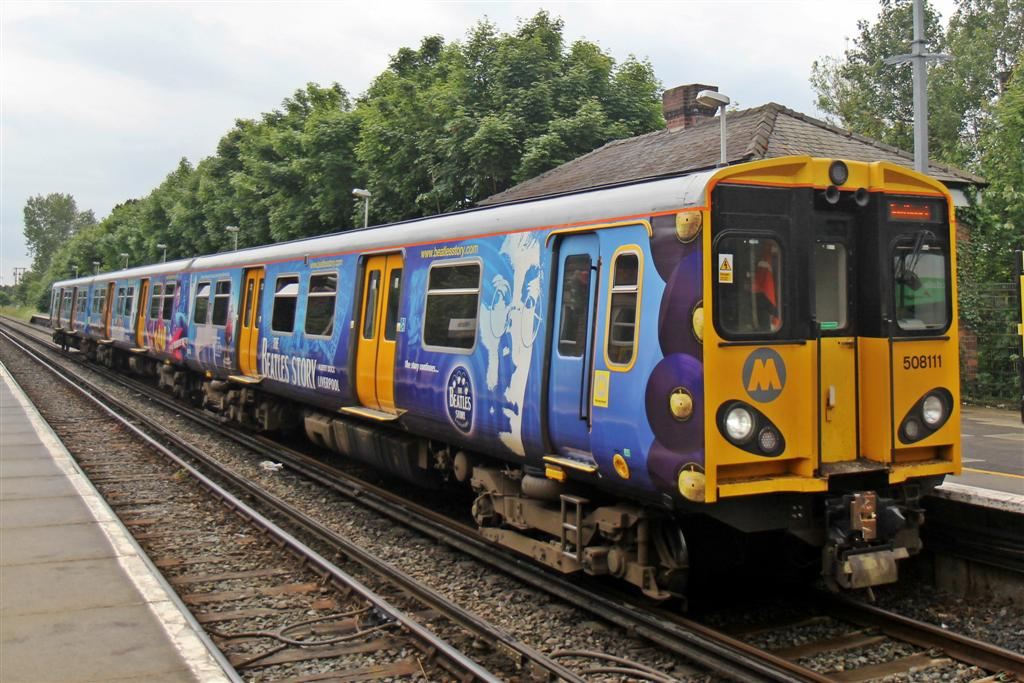
The Beatles Story in 2012

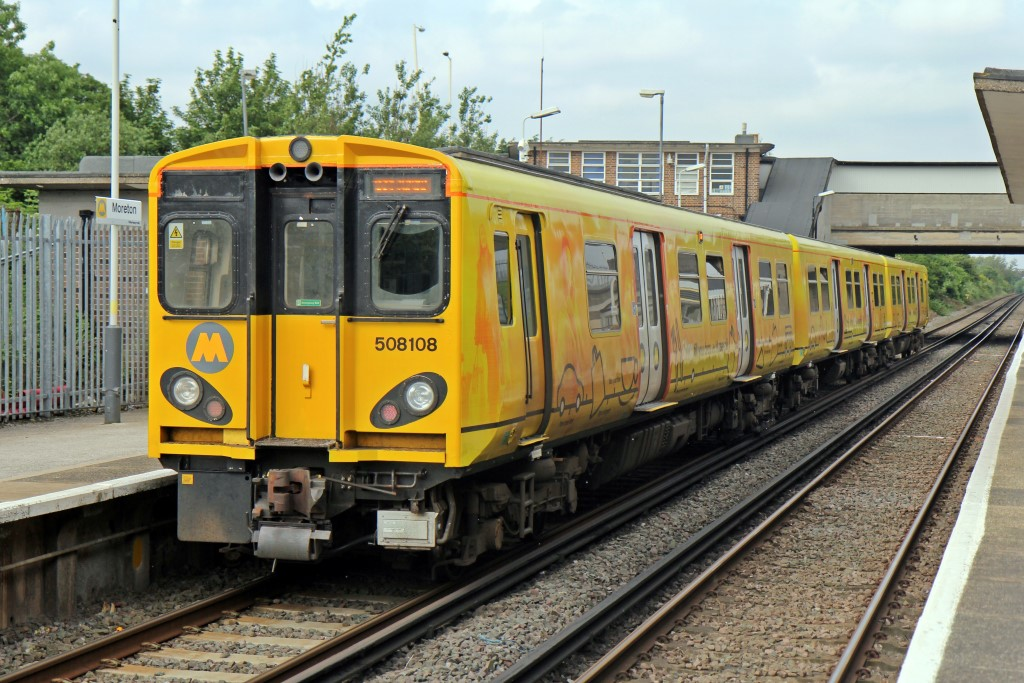
Good Communications in 2014

=== Named units ===
Named units were as follows:

- 508111 – The Beatles
- 508123 – William Roscoe
- 508136 – Wilfred Owen MC (formerly Capital of Culture)
