= Sandite =

Railway adhesion substance

Sandite is a substance used on railways in the UK, Ireland, US, the Netherlands and Belgium to combat leaves on the line, which can cause train wheels to slide and become damaged with flat spots. Sandite consists of a mixture of sand, antifreeze and steel shot.

Leaf build up on the railhead can also cause signalling issues and 'disappearing trains' on the rail control systems (because of the electrically insulating effect of the leaves, which can prevent operation of track circuits).

British Rail conducted research, in 1976, to determine the suitability of Sandite for use as an adhesion improver.

== Application ==
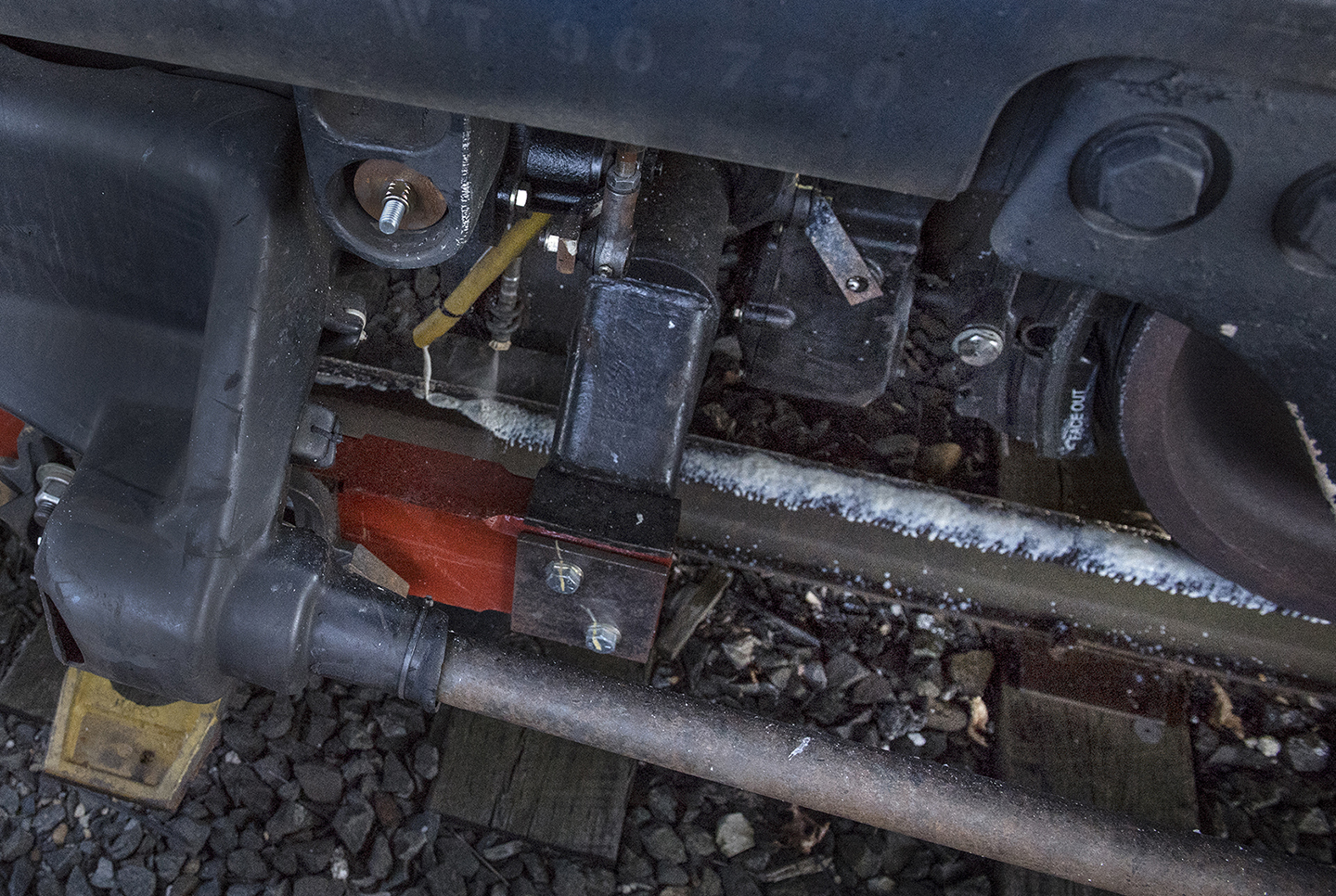
Sandite being applied on Long Island Rail Road tracks.

Sandite is usually applied by a special train which first clears fallen leaves from the rails using high-pressure water, then sprays the sandite onto the rail surface. To assist the staff on the Sandite train in locating the sites concerned, in England and Wales black on yellow lineside markers were installed:

- The first sign, with three stripes gives advance warning of a Sandite application site
- The second sign, with two stripes points where application should begin
- The third sign, with one stripe points where application should end

From 1992, lineside marker boards were installed on the Scottish Region, based on alternative white octagonal boards to denote the commencement and finish points, with no warning sign.

In The Netherlands, Sandite is applied by the first passenger trains of the day, with special maintenance trains available too.

Belgian Infrabel operates a dedicated train, with a diesel engine at either end.

== Equipment ==
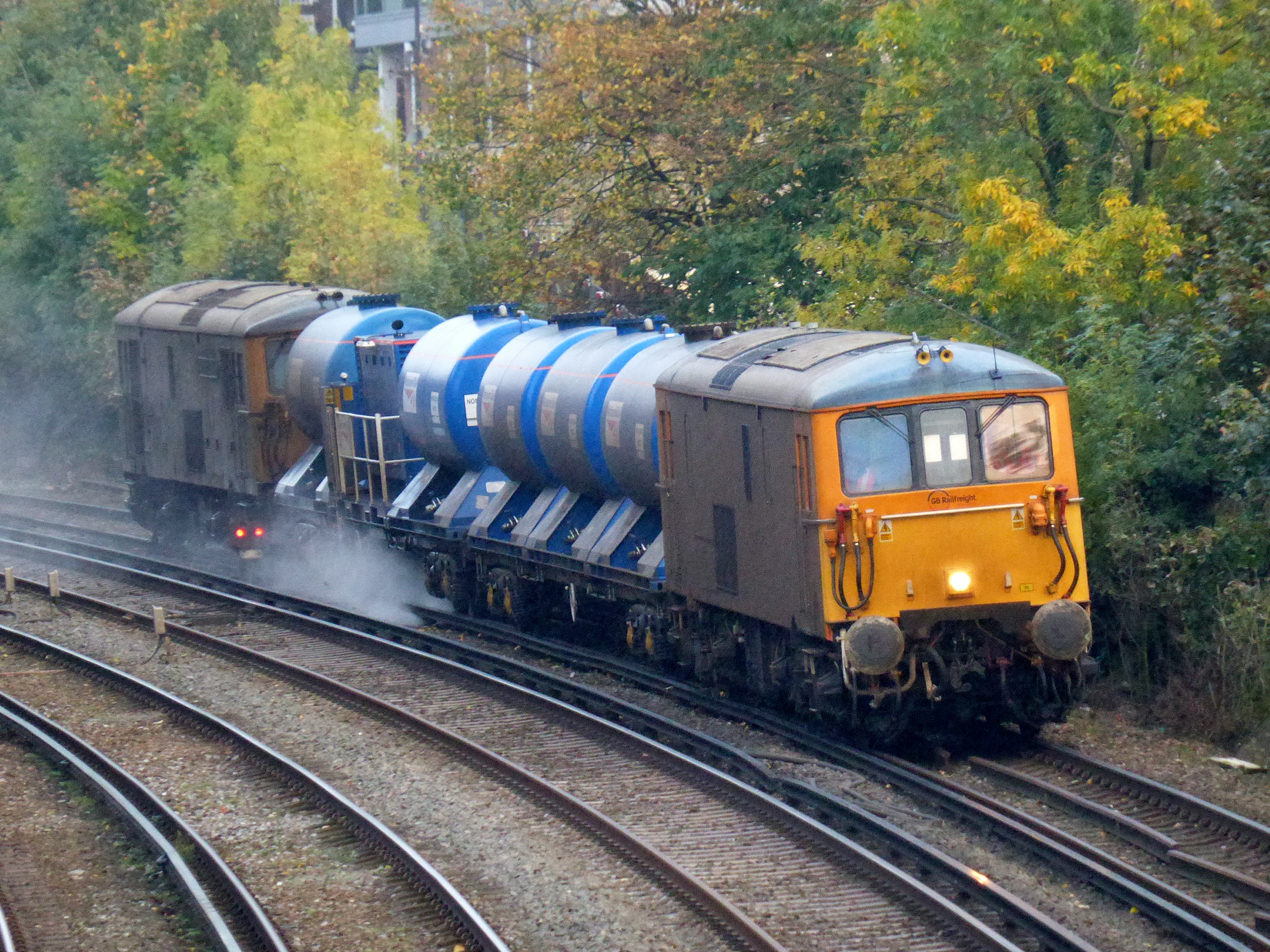
GB Railfreight operated Sandite train top and tailed by Class 73s in October 2014

British Rail initially used converted diesel and electric multiple units. Successor Network Rail built a fleet of dedicated sandite wagons which are hauled in top and tail formation by Colas Rail and, DB Cargo UK and Direct Rail Services locomotives. Network Rail also uses its MPVs. As at October 2021, 67 sets were operated.

== See also ==
- Adhesion railway
- Sandbox (locomotive)
- Slippery rail
- Tribology
