= Arriva Trains Merseyside =

Train operator in Liverpool, England

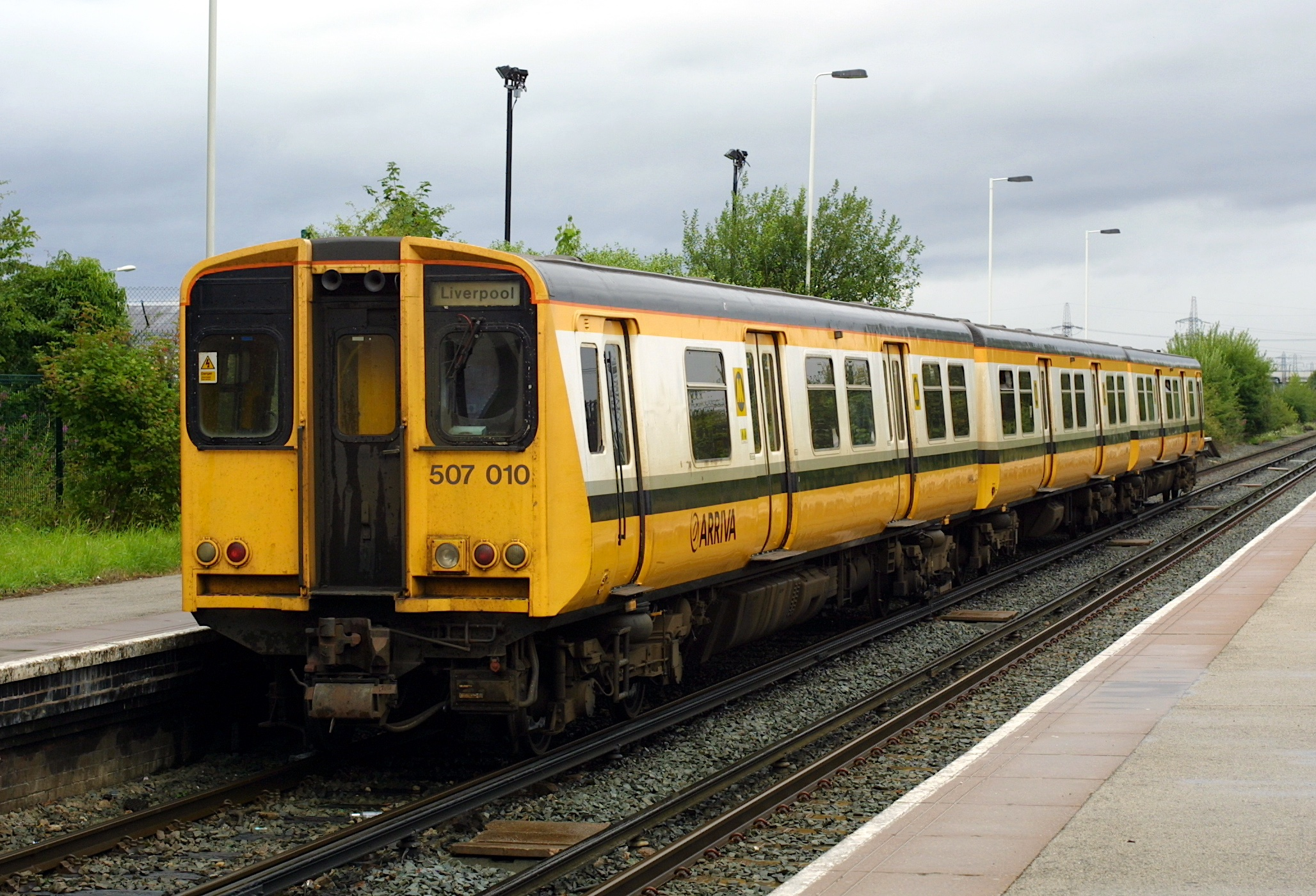

Overview
- Franchises: Merseyrail Electrics; 19 January 1997 – 20 July 2003
- Main region: Merseyside
- Other regions: Lancashire; Cheshire
- Fleet: 53
- Stations called at: 67
- Stations operated: 66
- Parent company: Arriva
- Reporting mark: ME
- Predecessor: British Rail
- Successor: Merseyrail Electrics 2002

Arriva Trains Merseyside was a British train operating company owned by Arriva that operated the Merseyrail Electrics franchise between January 1997 and July 2003. The company served the Northern Line and Wirral line of the Merseyrail network, covering Merseyside and parts of Cheshire and Lancashire. It inherited a fleet of Class 507 and Class 508 electric multiple units from British Rail, along with a small number of locomotives and departmental units.

The franchise was originally awarded to MTL in 1997, with operations commencing on 19 January that year. In February 2000, Arriva purchased MTL and rebranded the operation as Arriva Trains Merseyside in April 2001. On 23 April 2003, the franchise was converted to a concession, and was awarded to a 50:50 joint venture between Serco and NedRailways (then Abellio, now known as Transport UK Group), with operations transferring to the new Merseyrail concession on 20 July 2003 under the oversight of the Merseytravel Passenger Transport Executive.

== History ==
The Merseyrail Electrics franchise was created during the privatisation of British Rail in the mid-1990s. In December 1996, the Director of Passenger Rail Franchising awarded the contract to local transport operator MTL, which at the time also operated bus and other rail services in the Liverpool City Region. Operations commenced on 19 January 1997 under the retained Merseyrail Electrics brand, using the existing fleet of Class 507 and Class 508 electric multiple units. Services covered the Northern Line and Wirral Line, linking central Liverpool with towns such as Southport, Ormskirk, Kirkby, Ellesmere Port, Chester, and New Brighton.

On 18 February 2000, MTL was purchased by Arriva for £84 million, bringing the franchise under Arriva's control. On 27 April 2001, the operation was formally rebranded as Arriva Trains Merseyside. The company introduced the standard Arriva corporate livery to parts of the fleet, although many trains retained variations of the original Merseyrail yellow scheme. Day-to-day operations and maintenance continued largely unchanged, with servicing carried out at Birkenhead North depot.

In early 2003, the Strategic Rail Authority and Merseytravel restructured the Merseyrail Electrics franchise into a long-term concession model, designed to be tightly integrated with the local transport executive. On 23 April 2003, the contract to operate the concession was awarded to a 50:50 joint venture between Serco and NedRailways (then Abellio, now known as Transport UK Group). Arriva Trains Merseyside ceased operations on 20 July 2003, when the services and rolling stock transferred to the new Merseyrail concessionaire.

== Rolling stock ==
Arriva Trains Merseyside inherited a fleet of Class 507 and Class 508 electric multiple units from Regional Railways. It also inherited a fleet of Class 73 locomotives and Class 936 EMUs for use on infrastructure trains; these were sold in 2002.

Fleet at end of franchise

Class	Image	Type	Top speed		Number	Routes operated	Built
Class	Image	Type	mph	km/h	Number	Routes operated	Built
507		EMU	75	120	32	Northern Line; Wirral Line	1978–1980
508/1		EMU	75	120	21	Northern Line; Wirral Line	1979–1980

Past fleet

Class	Image	Type	Top speed		Number	Routes operated	Built
Class	Image	Type	mph	km/h	Number	Routes operated	Built
73		Loco	80	129	4	Infrastructure train	1962
936		EMU	60	97	3	Infrastructure train	1955–1956

== Depot ==
Arriva Trains Merseyside's fleet was maintained at Birkenhead North Depot.

Preceded by Regional Railways; As part of British Rail	Operator of Merseyrail Electrics franchise 1997–2003	Succeeded by Merseyrail Electrics 2002; Merseyrail concession
