= Sandhills railway station =

Railway station in Liverpool, England

Sandhills
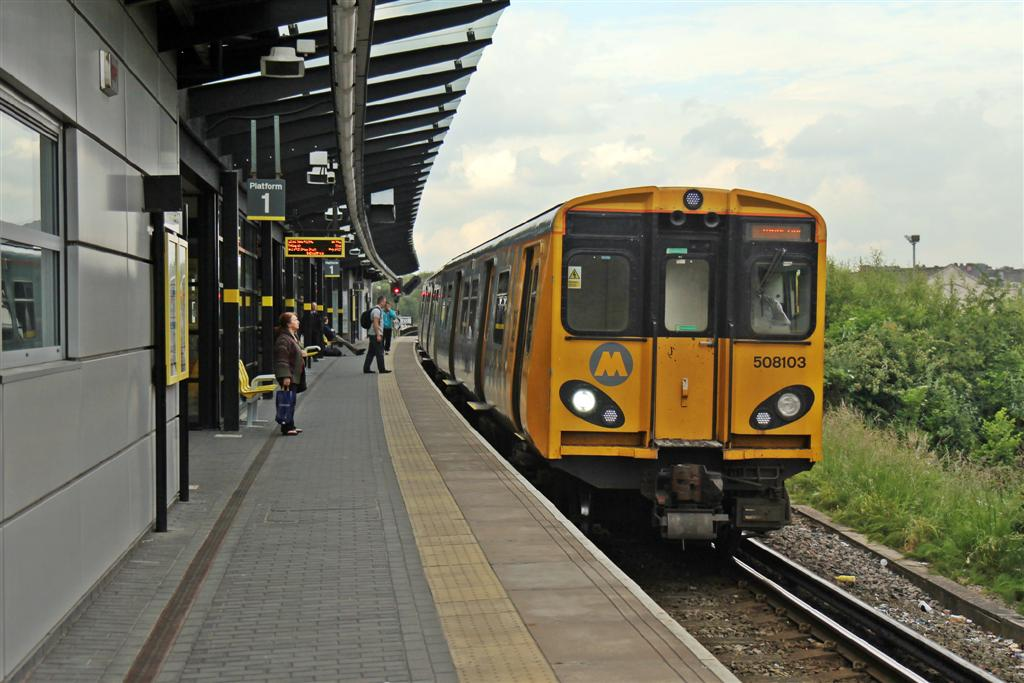
- Merseyrail Class 508 at Platform 1 in 2012

General information
- Location: Kirkdale, Liverpool; England
- Coordinates: 53.4300°N 2.9917°W
- Grid reference: SJ342930
- Manager: Merseyrail
- Transit authority: Merseytravel
- Platforms: 2

Other information
- Station code: SDL
- Fare zone: C1
- Classification: DfT category E

History
- Original company: Lancashire and Yorkshire Railway
- Pre-grouping: Lancashire and Yorkshire Railway
- Post-grouping: London, Midland and Scottish Railway

Key dates
- 1854: Opened as Liverpool North Docks
- about 1855: Renamed North Docks
- 1857: Renamed Sandhills
- By July 1881: Platforms relocated
- 1974: Station refurbished
- 2008: Station refurbished
- 2025: New footbridge and capacity increased

Passengers
- 2021/22: ▲0.815 million
- Interchange: ▲0.232 million
- 2022/23: ▼0.779 million
- Interchange: ▲0.556 million
- 2023/24: ▲0.858 million
- Interchange: ▲0.599 million
- 2024/25: ▲1.049 million
- Interchange: ▲0.842 million
- 2025/26: ▲1.425 million
- Interchange: ▲0.910 million
Location
Notes
- Passenger statistics from the Office of Rail and Road

Sandhills railway station is a railway station in Kirkdale, Liverpool, England, located to the north of the city centre on the Northern Line of the Merseyrail network. It was built by the Lancashire and Yorkshire Railway and now stands at the junction between the branch to Southport and the branch to Ormskirk and Kirkby.

The two platforms form a single island, overlooking the River Mersey on one side, and the former industrial area of Commercial Road on the other. It is also used by football fans heading for Liverpool F.C. and Everton F.C. matches: a bus service called 'Soccerbus' runs between the station and Anfield stadium on match-days only.

== History ==
The station was opened in 1854 by the Lancashire and Yorkshire Railway (L&YR). The first mention of it was in the July 1854 edition of Bradshaw's General Railway and Steam Navigation Guide for Great Britain and Ireland, when the station was still called Liverpool North Docks. Shortly afterwards, its name was shortened to North Docks, before being changed in its entirety to Sandhills in 1857. (The station was also called Sandhills for North Docks on some occasions.)

The station was located on the north side of Sandhills Lane. There were two platforms, one for the easternmost of the twin double-track lines and an island platform to the west, which was sandwiched between the main lines. There was also a further pair of tracks on this side of the station, which formed a loop but did not serve it, with the station building being to the west of these tracks.

By 9 July 1881 the platforms had been moved from north to south of Sandhills Lane. By 1890 there were four of them, one on each side of the four-track running lines and an island platform serving the two inner tracks. The outer platforms had waiting rooms, each with a small canopy over the platform in front. The ticket office was located south of the eastern platform.

By 1966, the island platform also acquired a waiting room with a small canopy. Before the 1974 refurbishment, the outer platforms were made of wood on concrete supports, while the island platform had concrete slabs as the platform surface on concrete supports; the latter was the only one that remained open after 1974.

The L&YR amalgamated with the London and North Western Railway on 1 January 1922, which in turn was grouped into the London, Midland and Scottish Railway in 1923.

Nationalisation followed in 1948, and in 1978 the station became part of the Merseyrail Network's Northern Line (operated by British Rail until privatised in 1995).

In 2006, a major redevelopment plan for the station was proposed, which included the construction of a completely new booking hall and greatly improved facilities on the platform. On 24 April 2007, an agreement was reached for £6 million worth of improvements to the station. In November 2007, it was announced that the station would be closed for refurbishment from 17 November 2007 to March 2008. A large canopy was erected, originally intended to cover the full length of the platform, but now covers approximately half. Previously passengers had to walk up a ramp to reach the ticket office, then through a subway and up ramps to reach the platform. Now the ramp remains, with alternate staircase leading to a lift directly into the booking office, accessing both sides of the island platforms. In addition, a dedicated bus-rail interchange was built, improving transport beyond the station to localities such as Kirkdale, Anfield and Everton. The opening date was extended until July 2008, when the station reopened in a partially completed state. Work on the station was fully completed in early 2009.

Between March and December 2024, the station's capacity was increased as part of the Liverpool Waters development and in anticipation of the opening of Everton F.C.'s new Hill Dickinson Stadium. The work included the development of a fan zone in the car park to cope with large crowds on match days, with an additional footbridge being opened in 2025.

== Facilities ==
The station is staffed 15 minutes before the first train and 15 minutes after the last. There are toilets, CCTV on the platform, and a ticket office. There are departure and arrival screens on the platform for passenger information. Each of the two platforms has covered seating. The station has no car park; however, there is a bicycle rack with 10 spaces. The station is fully wheelchair accessible, and access to the station is via lifts and ramps.

== Services ==
Off-peak service frequency is as follows:

- 4 trains per hour (tph) to Southport
- 4 tph to Ormskirk
- 4 tph to Headbolt Lane
- 12 tph to Liverpool Central
  - of which 4 tph continue to Hunts Cross

During late evenings and on Sundays, frequencies are reduced to 2 tph on the Ormskirk and Headbolt Lane lines. On Sundays, frequencies are reduced to 2 tph beyond Liverpool Central to Hunts Cross and to Southport, giving a total of 6 tph from all lines between Sandhills and Liverpool Central.

== Gallery ==
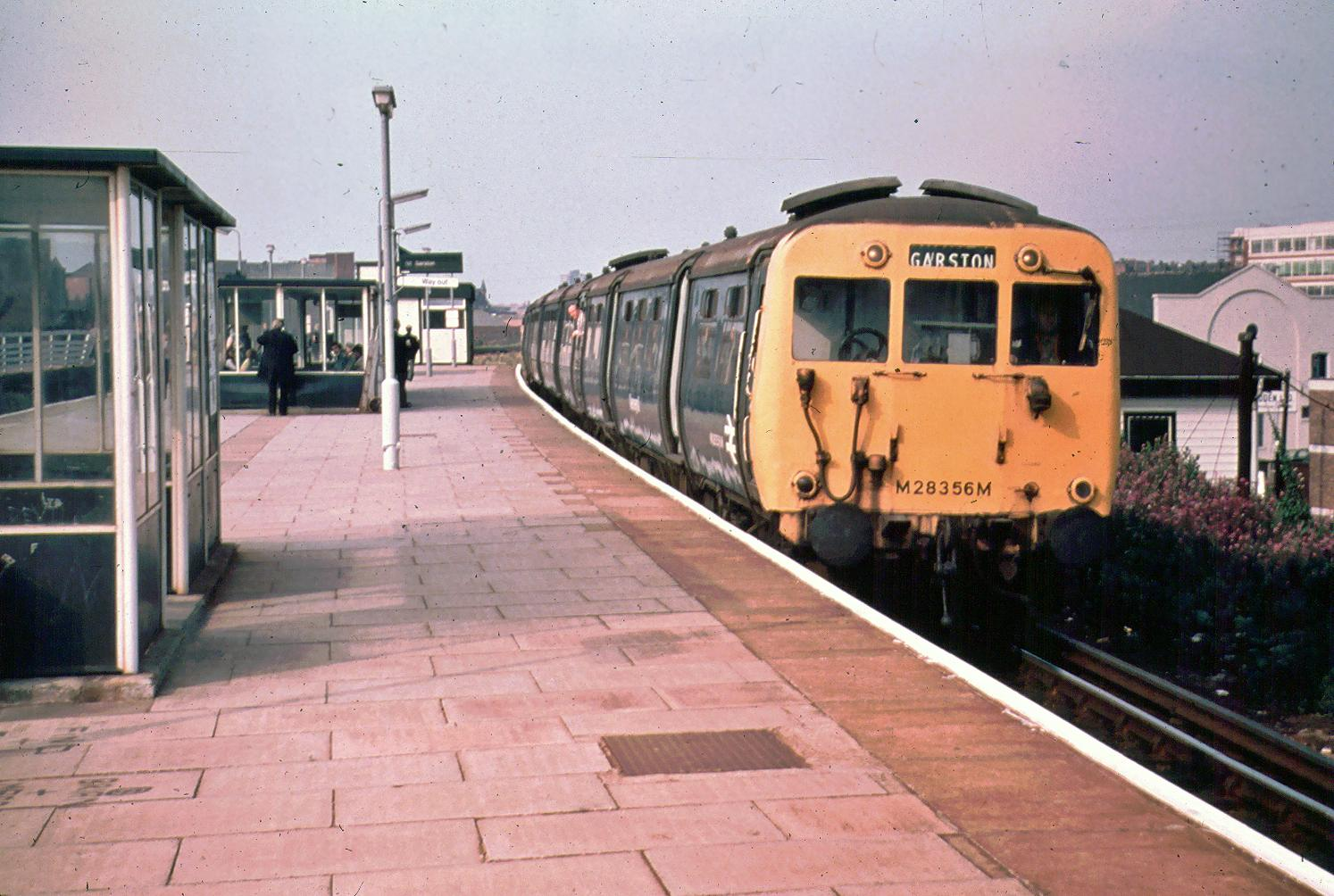
Sandhills station in 1979

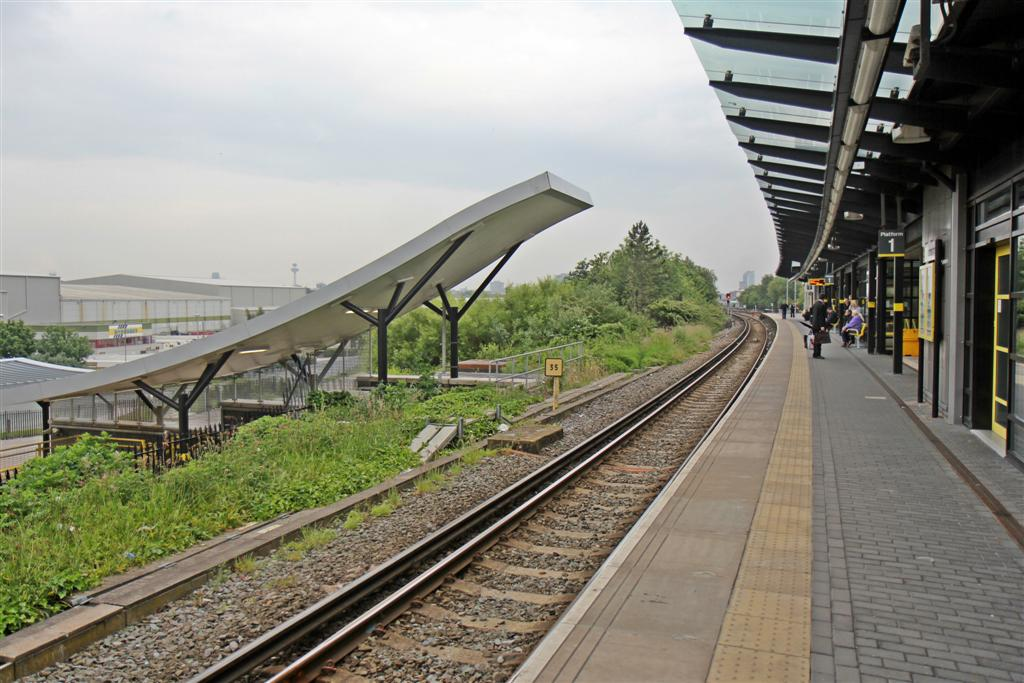
The main entrance, viewed from platform 1.

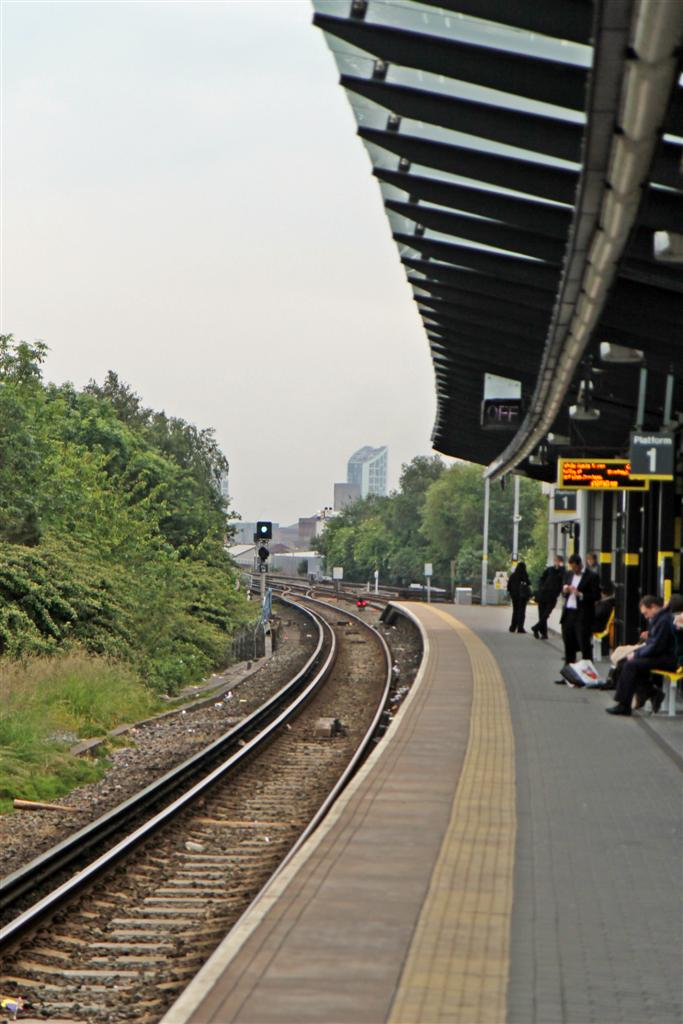
Platform 1, with Alexandra Tower in the distance.

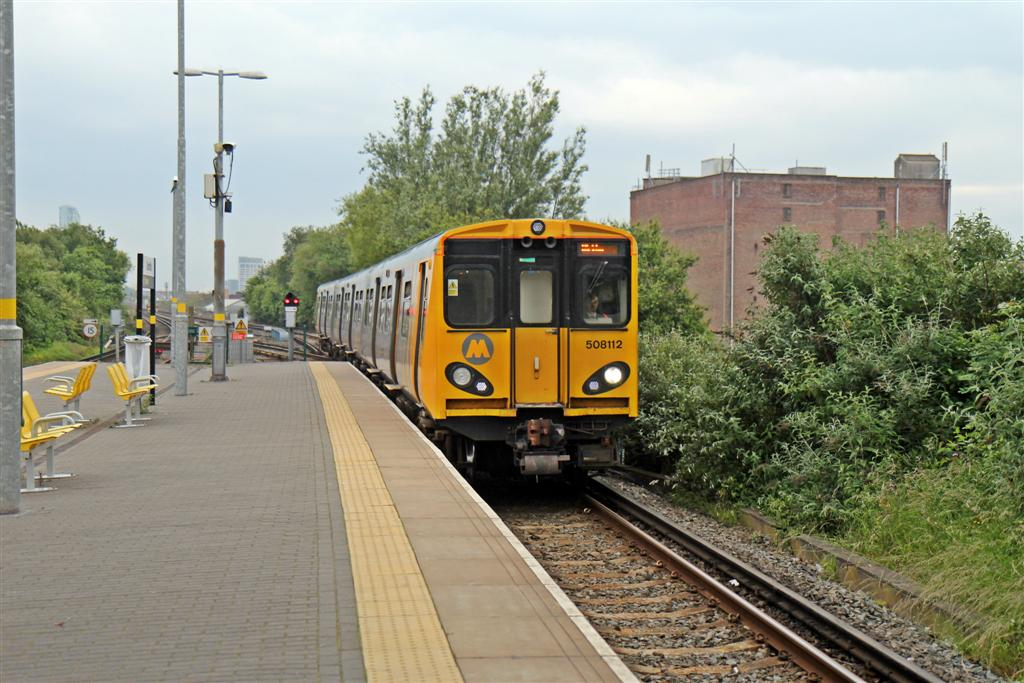
A Merseyrail Class 508 arrives with a service from Liverpool.

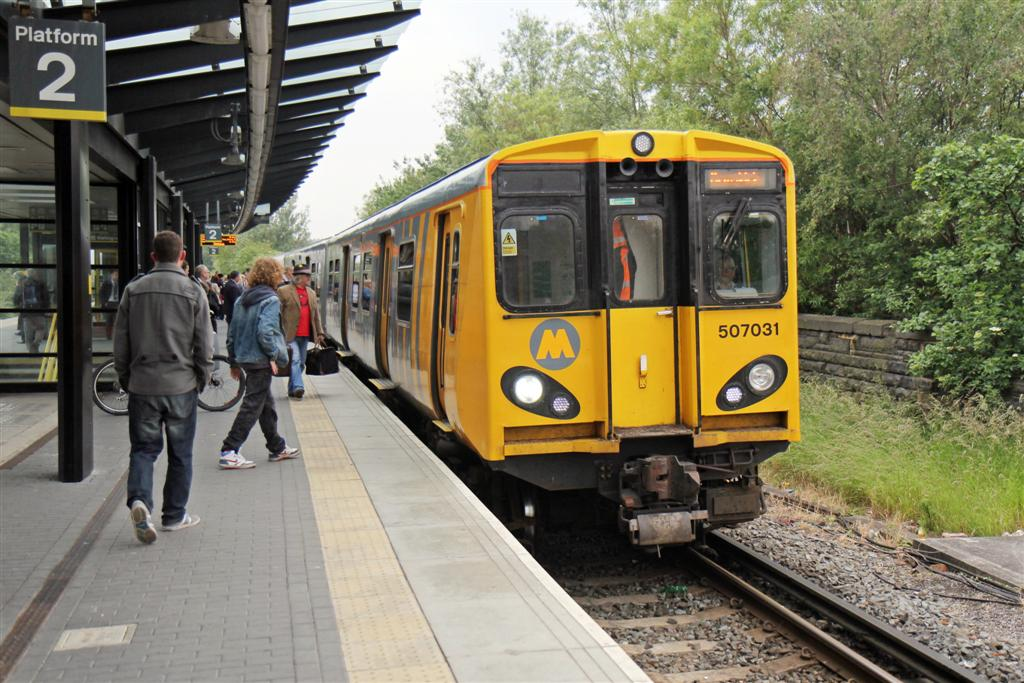
A Merseyrail Class 507 arrives with a service from Liverpool.

== Land history ==
In the early 19th century, the Sandhills estate was bought by Liverpool lawyer and property speculator John Leigh (1752–1823). Not only did he build a "handsome house, where he had beautiful gardens, complete with hothouses and conservatories", but he also converted much of the pasture land into the clay pits and brickworks needed for Liverpool's rapid growth - he is said to have lowered the ground level by seven to eight feet (well over two metres). His son, John Shaw Leigh (1791-1871), reaped the greatest profit, selling plots piecemeal at huge profits to create the land needed for the expanding docks and railways.

== Bibliography ==
- Awdry, Christopher (1990). Encyclopaedia of British Railway Companies. London: Guild Publishing. CN 8983.
- Pixton, Bob (2008). Liverpool and Manchester 3:Lancashire & Yorkshire Lines. Kestrel Railway Books. ISBN 978-1-905505-07-4.
- Quick, Michael (2023) [2001]. Railway passenger stations in Great Britain: a chronology (PDF). version 5.05. Railway & Canal Historical Society.

Preceding station	National Rail	Following station
Bank Hall towards Southport	Merseyrail; Northern Line; Southport Branch	Moorfields towards Liverpool Central or Hunts Cross
Kirkdale towards Ormskirk or Headbolt Lane	Merseyrail; Northern Line; Kirkby/Ormskirk Branch	Moorfields towards Liverpool Central or Hunts Cross
	Historical railways	
Bank Hall; Line and station open	Lancashire and Yorkshire Railway; Liverpool, Crosby and Southport Railway	Liverpool Exchange; Line and station closed
Kirkdale; Line and station open	Lancashire and Yorkshire Railway; Liverpool, Ormskirk and Preston Railway; Liverpool and Bury Railway	Liverpool Exchange; Line and station closed
