= Southport Carriage Sidings =

Train stabling point in Southport, Merseyside

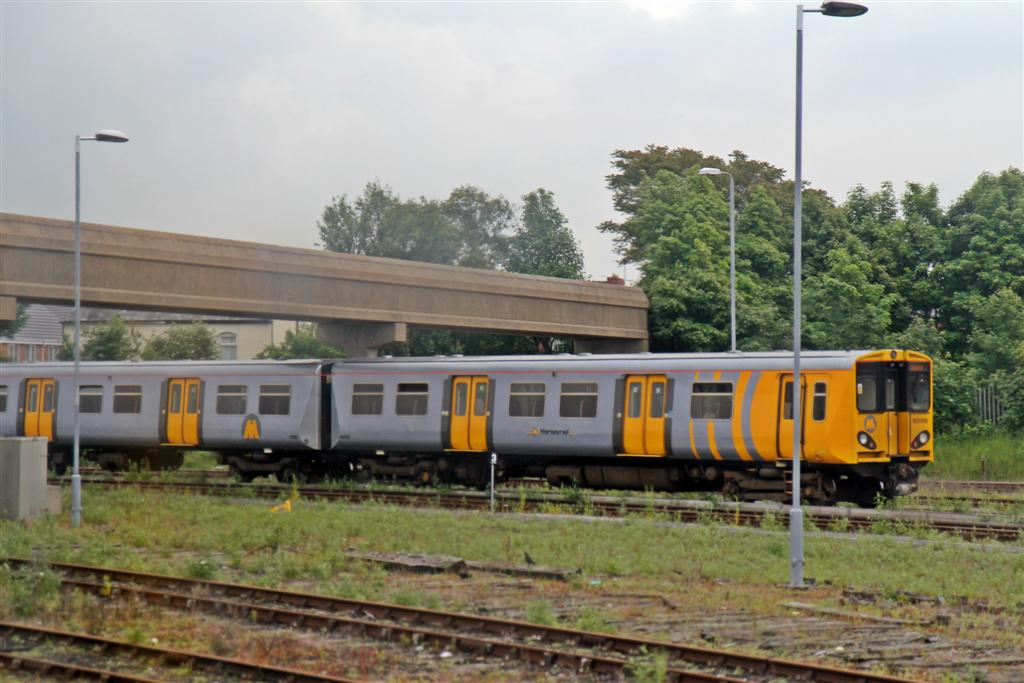
- A Merseyrail Class 507 at Southport Carriage Sidings
- Interactive map of Southport Carriage Sidings

Location
- Location: Southport, Merseyside
- Coordinates: 53.6445°N 2.9987°W
- OS grid: SD340169

Characteristics
- Owner: Network Rail
- Operator: Merseyrail
- Depot code: SO (1973-)
- Type: Merseyrail

Southport Carriage Sidings are located in Southport, Merseyside, England, at the wye of the Northern Line and the Manchester–Southport line, near Southport station.

== Present ==
They provide stabling for Merseyrail Class 777
