= MTL (transport company) =

1992–2000 British transport operator

MTL Trust Holdings
- Industry: Transport
- Founded: 1992
- Defunct: 2000
- Fate: Purchased by Arriva
- Successor: Arriva North West; Arriva Trains Northern
- Headquarters: Liverpool, Merseyside
- Services: Bus transport Coach travel Rail transport

MTL Trust Holdings was an English bus, coach and train operator based in Liverpool, Merseyside. MTL was originally part of the MPTE. To comply with the Transport Act 1985, the bus operations were divested into a new independent company, Merseyside Transport Limited (MTL). Merseyside PTA retained shareholding, but the company was purchased by its management and staff in a £5.9 million Employee Share Ownership Plan in 1993. On 17 February 2000, MTL was purchased by Arriva for £85 million, with MTL's shareholding workers each receiving £13,500 in windfall gains from the sale.

== Bus operations ==
The original bus division, Merseybus, introduced several new brand names, many outside of Merseyside, expanding into Manchester, North London, Lancaster, Warrington and South Lancashire. The company also owned Sightseers, a coach holiday business and had a full ABTA travel agency, "The TravelShop", in Williamson Square, Liverpool and in Eastbank Street, Southport.

MTL Services employed many cleaning, maintenance and security staff in London and on Merseyside whilst MTL Engineering refurbished many hundreds of vehicles at the Edge Lane plant in Liverpool.

=== Merseybus ===
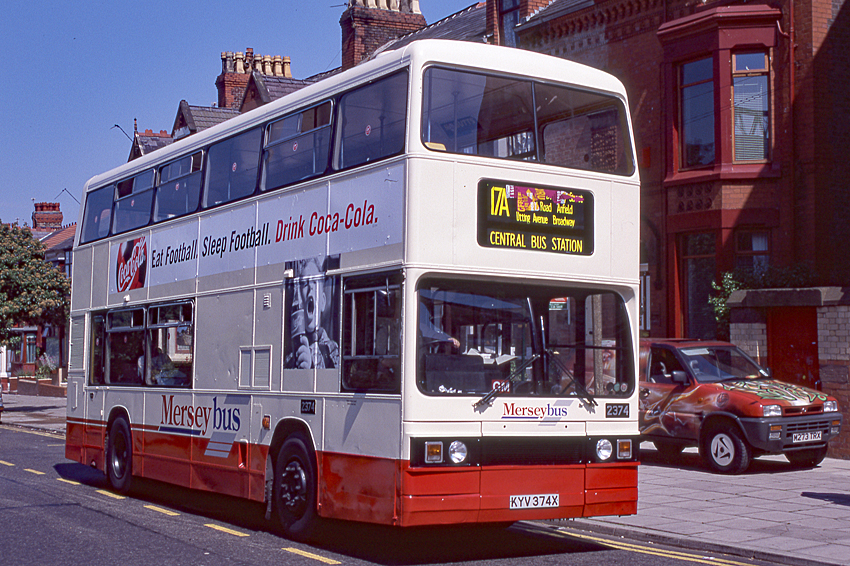
Merseybus Leyland Titan in MTL Trust Holdings livery in Anfield in June 1996

The principal branding for the former Merseyside Transport (PTE) bus operation from 26 October 1986, Merseybus encompassed the following depots and divisions:

- Liverpool North Division - Gillmoss, Green Lane and Walton (Carisbroke Road, also known as Spellow Lane)
- Liverpool South Division - Edge Lane, Garston (Speke Road) and Speke (Shaw Road, also known as Woodend Avenue)
- St Helens Division - Jackson Street/Shaw Street.
- Southport Division - Canning Road
- Wirral Division - Birkenhead, Laird Street

=== Fareway Passenger Services Ltd/MTL Fareway ===
Fareway Passenger Services was Merseyside's first major newcomer to bus operation in the post-deregulation period. The company was established by four former Merseyside Transport bus drivers who remortgaged their homes and used the redundancy payments they received when laid off from their former employer. Fareway commenced operations on 16 February 1987 with the F1 service, the first such commercial service to operate on Merseyside following deregulation; the F1 ran between Fareway's Hornhouse Lane depot on the Kirkby Industrial Estate to Liverpool's Pier Head and charged significantly lower fares than Merseybus, who had withdrawn services in North Liverpool and Kirkby. The F1 quickly gained 30-minute evening and Sunday operation as a result of high passenger demand, and over the next 18 months, Fareway's operations expanded rapidly; by the end of 1989, Fareway had become the biggest independent bus operator on Merseyside, operating a core network of seven high-frequency F-prefixed commercial services on the major bus corridors linking Kirkby and North Liverpool to Liverpool city centre, as well as ten Merseytravel contracts.

Despite sustained competition from other operators such as Merseybus, North Western and Liverline, Fareway would successfully maintain its network of services in Kirkby and North Liverpool for the next few years while also establishing a coach excursion and private hire division, gaining a public reputation for a clean bus fleet, low fares and efficiently-run services. Fareway's first new vehicles that entered service in January 1989, these being ten Northern Counties Palatine bodied Leyland Olympians, were the first new double-decker buses for an independent operator in North West of England since deregulation. However, by 1992, rumours began circulating that Fareway was in financial trouble and the once generally clean, well-maintained fleet was starting to look tired and dirty. With rival Merseybus now part of MTL Trust Holdings and engaged in a programme of consolidation and expansion, in April 1993, Fareway would be acquired by MTL.

Initially, MTL kept Fareway as a separate entity from the core Merseybus division, maintaining the Fareway route network and its yellow and blue livery; the only sign of MTL ownership of Fareway were stickers for the SuperSaver season ticket that Merseybus had introduced in 1990, now also valid on Fareway services. From late 1993, however, MTL began to exert more influence over the Fareway operation, replacing time-expired Fareway buses with newer second-hand buses from the MTL fleet and beginning to operate Fareway as a low-cost subsidiary of their core bus network in competition with other operators. In summer 1995, the company was rebranded MTL Fareway, with MTL's red and cream corporate livery adopted across the fleet. Despite an investment in a batch of 10 new Wright Endurance bodied Volvo B10Bs branded for the F3 service, the next few years would see MTL gradually close down the MTL Fareway operation, with the Fareway licence eventually surrendered by MTL and services and vehicles transferred to Merseybus' Gillmoss depot in April 1997.

=== MerseyRider ===
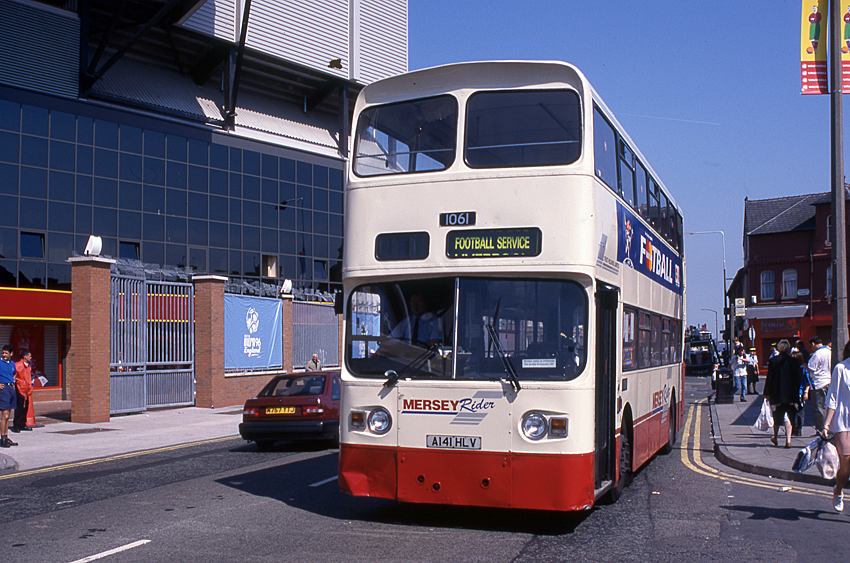
MerseyRider Leyland Atlantean at Anfield during Euro 96

MerseyRider began life in the autumn of 1992 as a low-cost operation set up by Merseybus a few months prior to the sale to privatisation. MerseyRider initially operated out of Liverline's former Blackstock Street depot near Liverpool City Centre before later moving to a formerly-mothballed depot in Speke, running many Merseytravel contracts on behalf of Merseybus as well as commercial services originally operated by Liverline. and the bus fleet included Merseybus's remaining Willowbrook bodied Leyland Atlanteans and a number of hired minibuses, which were painted in a cream and green livery. In May 1994, MTL acquired former Merseyside Transport driver David Forrest's independent operator Blue Triangle, merging it into the MerseyRider operation.

MerseyRider, however, was creating conflict between MTL's management, who were keen to expand the operation further, and its employees and the unions, who were concerned about new drivers being on lower pay rates compared to those within the core Merseybus operation. After the transfer of Merseybus' Halewood service 72 to MerseyRider, employees at all MTL divisions, with the exception of MTL Fareway, London and MerseyRider, held a series of strikes between 1994 and 1995, including a two-day wildcat strike in April 1995 against the advice of trade unions. MTL reconsidered its position, with revised pay offers across the company resulting in one-day strikes and overtime bans at other MTL divisions, and eventually brought MerseyRider's terms and conditions in line with those of Merseybus. This soon compromised the profitability of the operation and subsequently, MerseyRider was closed in August 1996.

=== Liverbus/MTL Liverbus ===
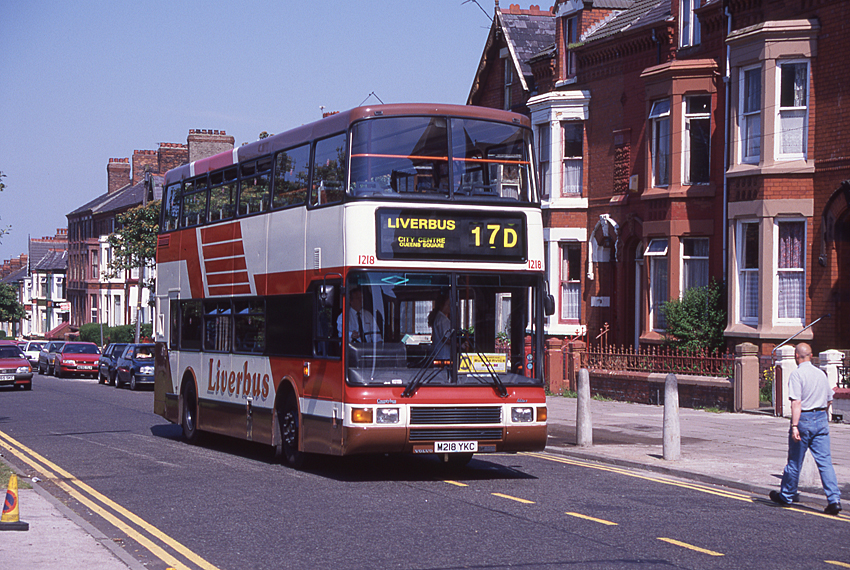
Liverbus Volvo Olympian in Anfield

Originally owned by Gemsam Holdings, Liverbus was an independent operator set up by former Merseybus employees in January 1990. Initially founded with a small fleet of former Greater Manchester Leyland Atlanteans, Liverbus built up a network of services between its Huyton base and Liverpool city centre competing with Merseybus services from the Gillmoss and Green Lane depots. A private hire/coach excursion operation, Coach 2000, was established in the summer of 1990.

By 1993, Liverbus had become involved in three long-term Merseytravel contracts, had invested in numerous new single and double-decker vehicles mainly bodied by Northern Counties, and had established a London operation, London Suburban Bus. Initially Merseybus did not operate services in competition with Liverbus, however in 1995, the company began competing with Liverbus by completely duplicating its entire network. By April 1995, it was announced that MTL had acquired Gemsam Holdings in an over £2 million deal, which included the operations of Liverbus and Coach 2000.

Initially the Liverbus white, red and brown livery was maintained, but an announced investment of new buses did not materialise, and by 1996, the MTL fleet livery along with a new fleetname, MTL Liverbus, was adopted. The Huyton depot and route network was maintained until the acquisition of MTL by Arriva in 2000, who after a route revision in the spring of 2000, withdrew many of the former Liverbus routes. Arriva closed down Huyton depot in June 2006 as it was too small and transferred operations to Green Lane depot in Old Swan.

=== MTL London ===
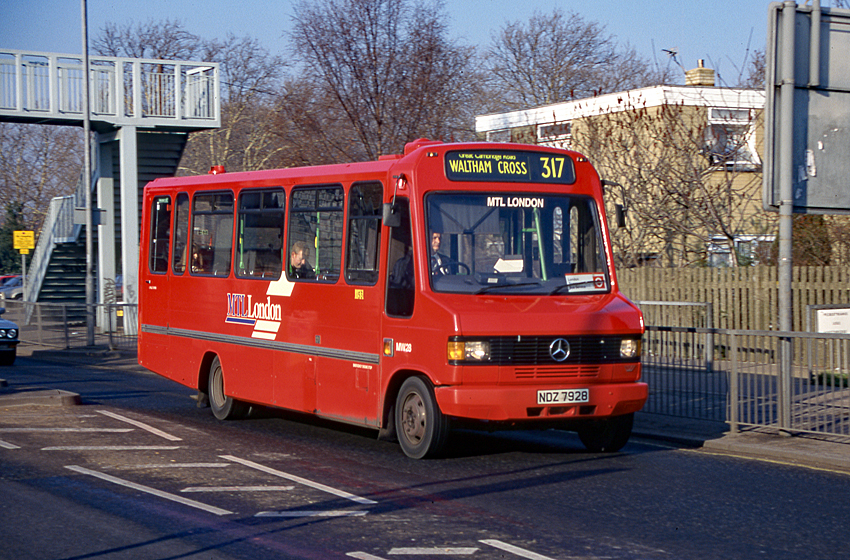
MTL London Wright bodied Mercedes-Benz 811D in Enfield in January 1997

On 26 October 1994, MTL purchased London Northern from London Regional Transport, the seventh of ten LBL subsidiaries to be sold amid the privatisation of London bus services. Rebranded MTL London, the company operated services from four bus garages in Chalk Farm, Finchley, Holloway and Potters Bar. In April 1996, MTL purchased London Suburban, based at a single garage in Edmonton, from Gemsam Holdings. Both companies would be sold to management and employee-owned former LBL subsidiary Metroline for £41.9 million, of which £8.8 million included taking on debt accrued by MTL, in August 1998.

== Coach operations ==
=== Heysham Travel ===
Heysham Travel was an independent coach operator that was operating commercial bus services in and around Heysham, Lancaster and Morecambe in North Lancashire. After privatisation, MTL attempted to expand into Lancaster in competition with council-owned Lancaster City Transport, and as a result, took over Heysham Travel in September 1993 in order to position themselves in the area.

Being located at least 40–50 miles away from MTL's core operations on Merseyside, the Heysham Travel fleet was managed at an arms' length and had few opportunities for expansion. After the acquisition of MTL by Arriva in 2000, the operation was sold to Stagecoach Lancaster in April of that year.

=== Village Group Tours ===
Village Group Tours was a long-established coach operator based in the Garston Village area of south Liverpool, from which the 'Village' name was derived. Around 1992, Village entered Liverpool's 'bus war' on a large scale by beginning extensive Monday - Saturday daytime operations on two routes between Garston and Liverpool, which proved popular with students at the University of Liverpool. A new depot in Evans Road in Speke was used to house a fleet which by the end of 1997, had grown to around 60 vehicles.

Village was acquired by MTL in the spring of 1998, with the Evans Road depot retained by the company to operate ex-Merseybus and MerseyRider services. When MTL was acquired by Arriva, the Evans Road garage was quickly vacated and many of the services rationalised when they revised the MTL service network in April 2000.

== Railway operations ==
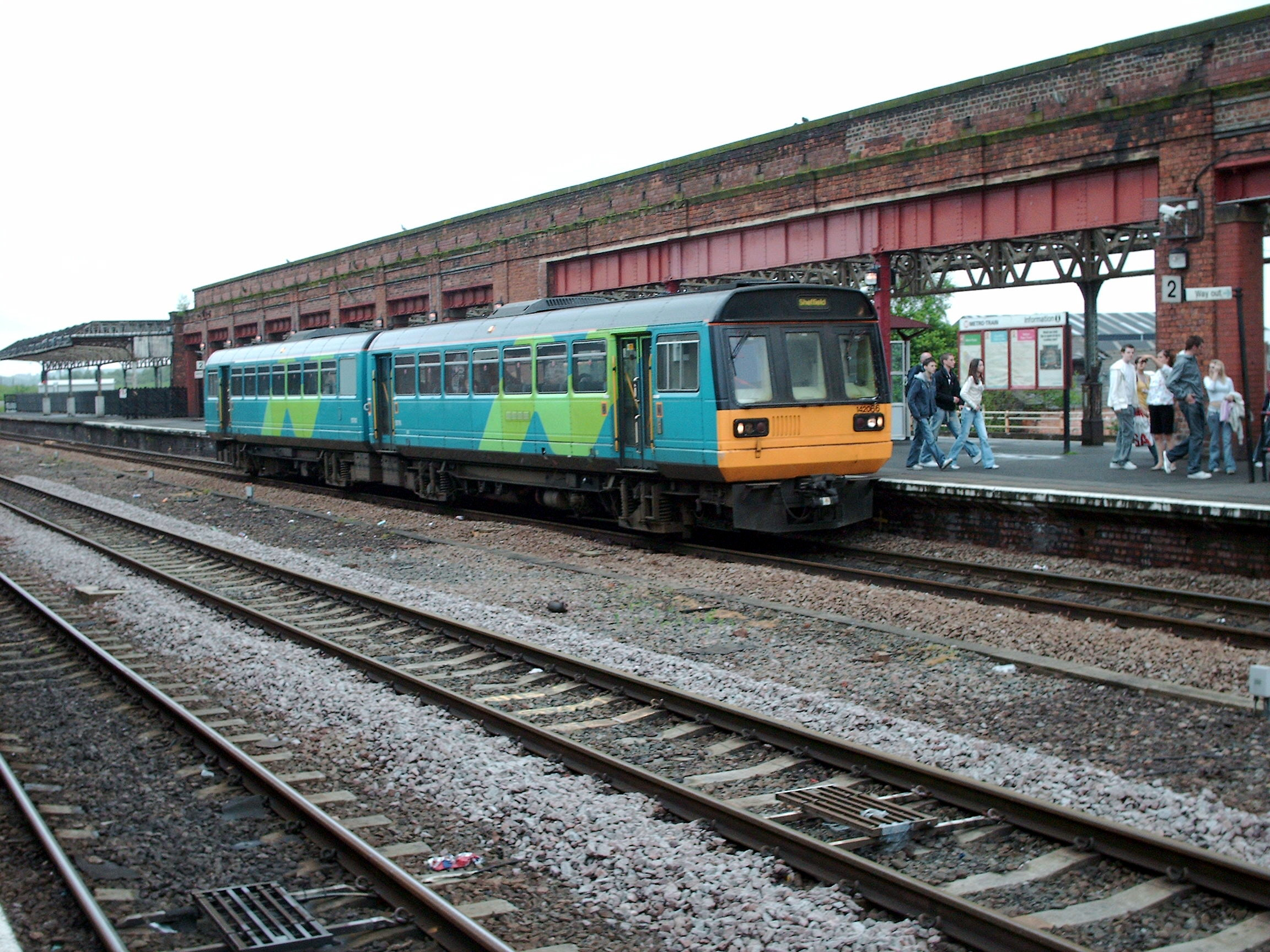
Northern Spirit Class 142 at Wakefield Kirkgate station

MTL was awarded two railway franchises in 1997, during the Privatisation of British Rail. Both franchises were taken over by Arriva in 2000.

Northern Spirit was a large franchise operating services across the whole of Yorkshire, including the Settle & Carlisle line and much of the North East. The franchise also included TransPennine Express trains from Liverpool and Blackpool to Scarborough, Hull and Newcastle. The franchise was rebranded as Arriva Trains Northern in April 2001.

Merseyrail Electrics was responsible for running the Merseyrail network in Merseyside. All services were subsidised by Merseytravel. The franchise was rebranded as Arriva Trains Merseyside in April 2001.
