= Transport UK Group =

British transport operator

- Company type: Private
- Industry: Transport
- Predecessor: Abellio
- Founded: February 2023; 3 years ago
- Founder: Management buyout led by Dominic Booth
- Headquarters: London, United Kingdom
- Area served: England
- Subsidiaries: East Midlands Railway; Merseyrail (50%); Transport UK London Bus
- Website: www.transport-uk.com

Transport UK Group (TUK) is a transport company which operates services in England. It commenced operations in February 2023 when it purchased the British assets of Abellio via a management buyout.

== History ==
In August 2022, Abellio agreed terms to sell its United Kingdom subsidiaries in a management buyout led by managing director Dominic Booth, subject to approval by the Office of Rail and Road and partner organisations Merseytravel and Transport for London (TfL). The deal was completed when final approvals were received in February 2023.

== Subsidiaries ==
Transport UK Group operates the following subsidiaries:

- East Midlands Railway, operates the East Midlands franchise under contract to the Department for Transport (DfT)
- Merseyrail (50% shareholding alongside Serco), operates the concession under contract to Merseytravel
- Transport UK London Bus, operates bus services under contract to TfL

Transport UK Group also held an 85% controlling interest in West Midlands Trains, along with Mitsui & Co., before the service was returned to state ownership on 1 February 2026.
