= Neil Scales =

British-Australian public servant

Director-General of the Department of Transport & Main Roads
- In office March 2013 – June 2023

Chief Executive Officer of TransLink
- In office March 2012 – March 2013

Chief Executive and Director General of Merseytravel
- In office 1999–2012

Personal details
- Occupation: Public servant

Neil Scales OBE is a former British-Australian public servant. He was the Director-General of the Department of Transport & Main Roads, in Queensland having assumed the office in 2013, and serving until June 2023.

== Career and Life ==
Between 1999 and 2012, Scales was chief executive officer and director-general of Merseytravel in Liverpool.

Scales resigned from Merseytravel in December 2011, to take up an appointment in the Queensland Public Sector. He joined TransLink in Brisbane, Australia, in March 2012 as chief executive officer.

In March 2013, Scales was appointed director-general of the Queensland Department of Transport & Main Roads. He retired in 2023.

== Awards ==
Scales was appointed an officer of the Order of the British Empire for services to transport.

Government offices
Preceded by Michael Caltabiano	Director-General of the Department of Transport and Main Roads; 2013–2023	Succeeded by Sally Stannard
