= Moorfields railway station =

Railway station in Liverpool

Moorfields
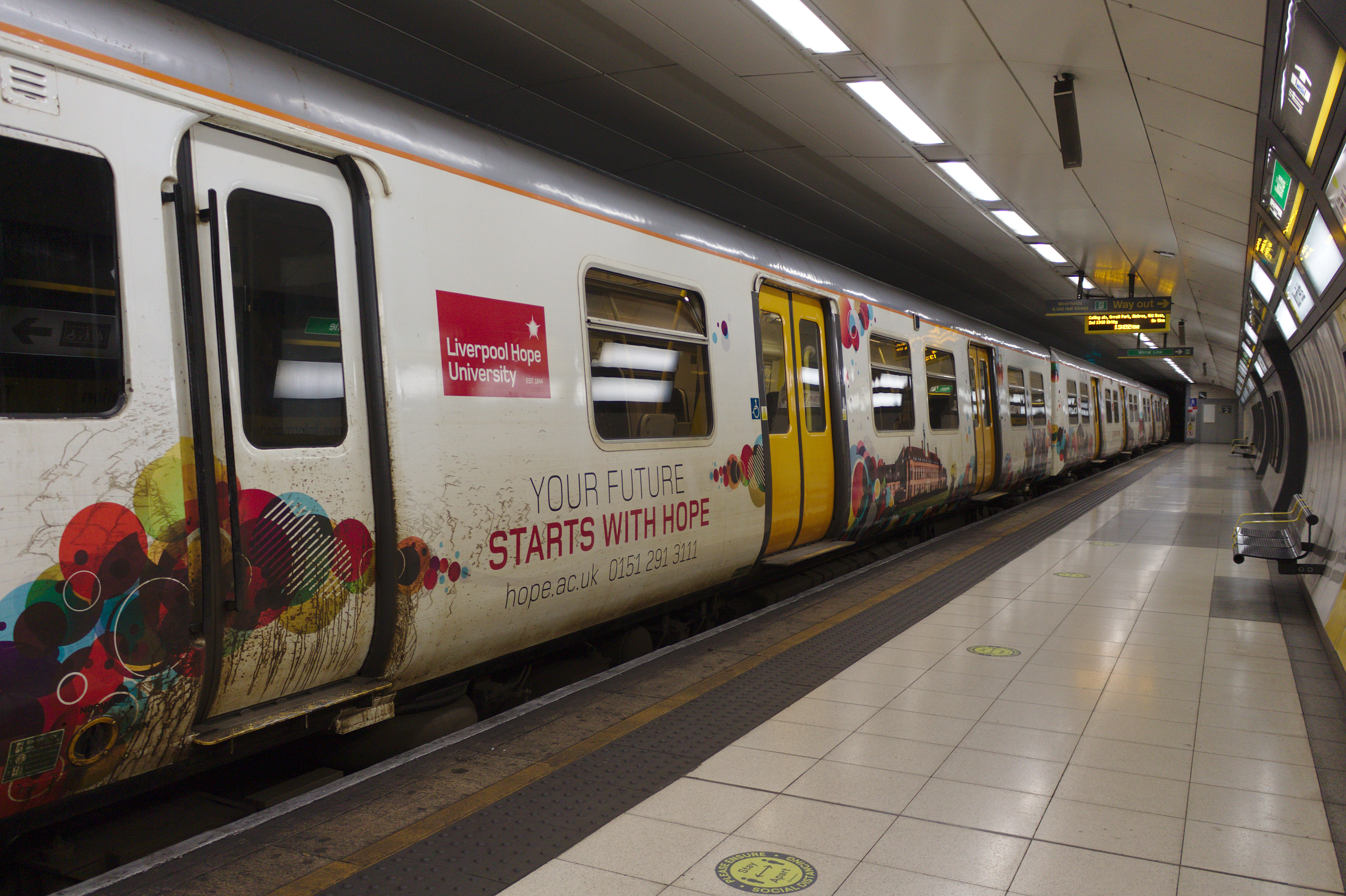
- A Merseyrail Class 507 in Liverpool Hope University livery on the Wirral Line platform

General information
- Location: Liverpool, Liverpool; England
- Coordinates: 53.4086°N 2.9892°W
- Grid reference: SJ342907
- Manager: Merseyrail
- Transit authority: Merseytravel
- Platforms: 3

Other information
- Station code: MRF
- Fare zone: C1
- Classification: DfT category D

History
- Original company: London Midland Region of British Railways

Key dates
- 2 May 1977: Low level (Northern line) platforms opened
- 30 October 1977: Deep level (Wirral line) platform opened

Passengers
- 2021/22: ▲4.808 million
- Interchange: ▲0.694 million
- 2022/23: ▲5.101 million
- Interchange: ▼0.532 million
- 2023/24: ▲5.642 million
- Interchange: ▲0.605 million
- 2024/25: ▲6.630 million
- Interchange: ▲0.852 million
- 2025/26: ▲7.264 million
- Interchange: ▼0.778 million
Location
Notes
- Passenger statistics from the Office of Rail and Road

Moorfields railway station is an underground railway station in the city centre of Liverpool, England. The station is situated on both the Northern and Wirral Lines of the Merseyrail network. It is the third-busiest station on the Merseyrail network, and the largest underground station. It is also the only station on the network having services to all other Merseyrail stations.

== History ==
Liverpool's rail network in 1977, showing Moorfields in relation to Liverpool Exchange

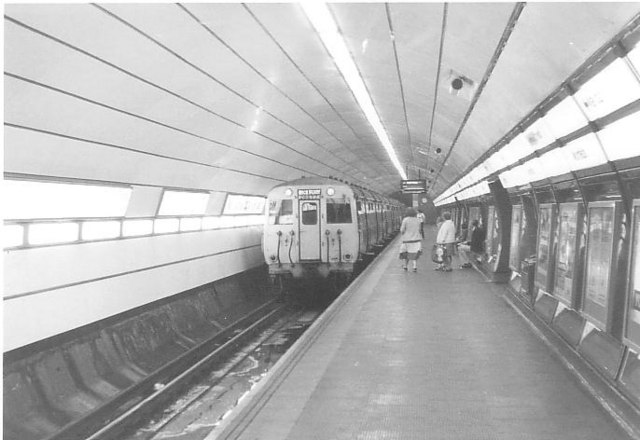
Shortly after the station opened in 1977

The station was built in the 1970s, as a replacement for Liverpool Exchange railway station, opening on 2 May 1977. The station was opened by British Rail and is accessed via entrances at Moorfields and on the corner of Old Hall Street and Tithebarn Street. The Old Hall Street entrance is open from only 5:30 am until 7 pm on weekdays.

Services from the north had previously terminated at nearby Liverpool Exchange terminus station. The newly created north–south crossrail Northern Line runs through Moorfields. Liverpool Exchange was closed and the line extended underground to the new Moorfields station. The line from the north continued through a new tunnel to Liverpool Central, continuing south to terminate at Garston. The line was later extended to Hunts Cross and opened in 1983. At the same time, another new tunnel was built, carrying the Wirral Line in a loop from James Street via Moorfields, Lime Street, and Liverpool Central before returning to James Street; the Wirral Line platform opened on 30 October 1977.

There are three platforms (two for the Northern Line and one for the Wirral Line) in two levels of tunnel. The Wirral Line platform is at a much deeper level to pass under the Queensway road tunnel.

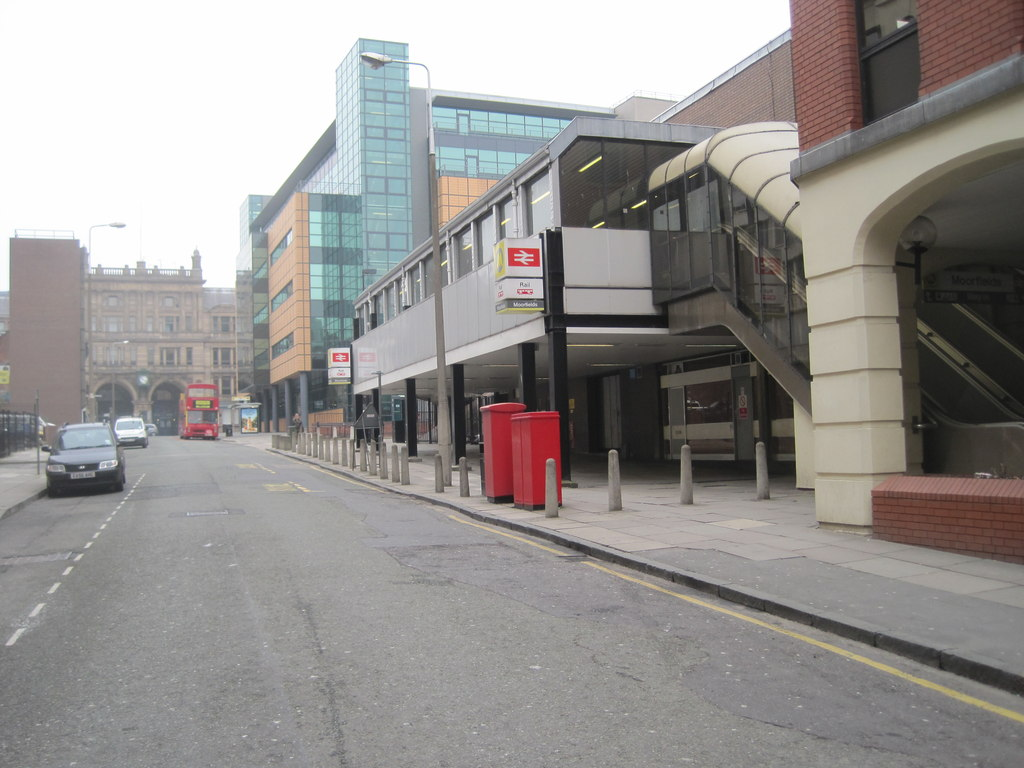
Exterior of the station's entrance on Moorfields.

Passengers must, curiously for an underground station, go up an escalator from the Moorfields entrance to reach the ticket office – the station was originally intended to connect with a pedestrian walkway system, designed to separate pedestrians from traffic. John Stoner, the architect who designed Moorfields to Roy Hughes' specification described the plan as "grotesque". Only a small section of the system was constructed in the 1970s and the scheme eventually fell by the wayside. The Old Hall Street entrance had a footbridge connecting it to One, Old Hall Street on the opposite side of the road. This was removed in the year 2000. From the ticket office, another escalator leads down to the main pedestrian tunnel which links the Northern and Wirral Line platforms and the Old Hall Street entrance.

The usage of the station Monday to Friday is much greater than the statistics show, since they credit "Liverpool" passengers to Lime Street station, and do not include day or season ticket holders. The station is however significantly quieter at weekends, since it is primarily used by people working in the business quarter and is less convenient for most of the city centre retail areas.

The ashes of Roy Vivian Hughes, the civil engineer who played a major part in the development of the Merseyrail system, are interred behind in a plaque on the wall of the main corridor.

=== Recent history ===
The station underwent an extensive refurbishment in 2015/16 as part of a £40 million investment from Network Rail to allow improvement works to take place at Merseyrail's underground stations, with the refurbishment of Moorfields costing £8 million. The refurbishment was completed in three phases, with each of the three platforms closing in turn for the work to be carried out. Additional funding for replacement of the station's escalators meant that the work was extended from the original April 2016 end date to July 2016.

On 21 March 2016, an extensive track renewal programme was announced for the Wirral Line Loop, requiring the closure of the Loop (and, as a result, the station's Wirral Line platform) between 3 January and 18 June 2017 whilst works take place. Episode 1 of series 9 of Inside No. 9 was filmed at Moorfields and broadcast in 2024. In 2026, there was a £1 million scheme to upgrade the exterior.

== Facilities ==
The station is staffed, 15 minutes before the first train and 15 minutes after the last train, and has platform CCTV. There is an M to Go shop, toilet and live departure and arrival screens, for passenger information. The station additionally has a 32-space cycle rack and secure indoor storage for 32 cycles. The Old Hall entrance has no disabled-access facilities. The Moorfields entrance has lifts but they have narrow entrances with openings of 800 mm.

== Services ==
Both lines on the Merseyrail network – the Northern Line and the Wirral Line – serve the station.

On the Northern Line, off-peak service level is as follows:

- 4 trains per hour to Southport
- 4 trains per hour to Ormskirk
- 4 trains per hour to Headbolt Lane
- 12 trains per hour to Liverpool Central, of which
  - 4 trains per hour continue to Hunts Cross via Liverpool South Parkway

During late evenings, frequencies are reduced to 2 trains per hour on the Kirkby and Ormskirk branches; the Southport and Hunts Cross service retains 4 trains per hour until end of service.

Sunday services reflect the evening service, but the service from Southport to Hunts Cross is also reduced to 2 trains per hour on Sundays during the winter season. Services remain at 4 trains per hour on Sunday during the summer season.

On the Wirral Line, off-peak service level is as follows:

- 4 trains per hour to New Brighton
- 4 trains per hour to West Kirby
- 4 trains per hour to Chester
- 2 trains per hour to Ellesmere Port

There are also extra services between Liverpool Central and Hooton during peak times.

Northern Line services use Platforms 1 and 2 at the station. Trains to Liverpool Central and Hunts Cross use Platform 1; trains to Southport, Ormskirk and Kirkby use Platform 2. All Wirral Line services depart from Platform 3.

== See also ==
- List of underground stations of the Merseyrail network

Preceding station	National Rail	Following station
Sandhills towards Southport, Ormskirk or Headbolt Lane	Merseyrail; Northern Line	Liverpool Central towards Liverpool Central or Hunts Cross
James Street (one-way operation)	Merseyrail; Wirral Line	Liverpool; Lime Street towards New Brighton, West Kirby, Chester or Ellesmere Port
