= Merseyrail =

Commuter rail system in England

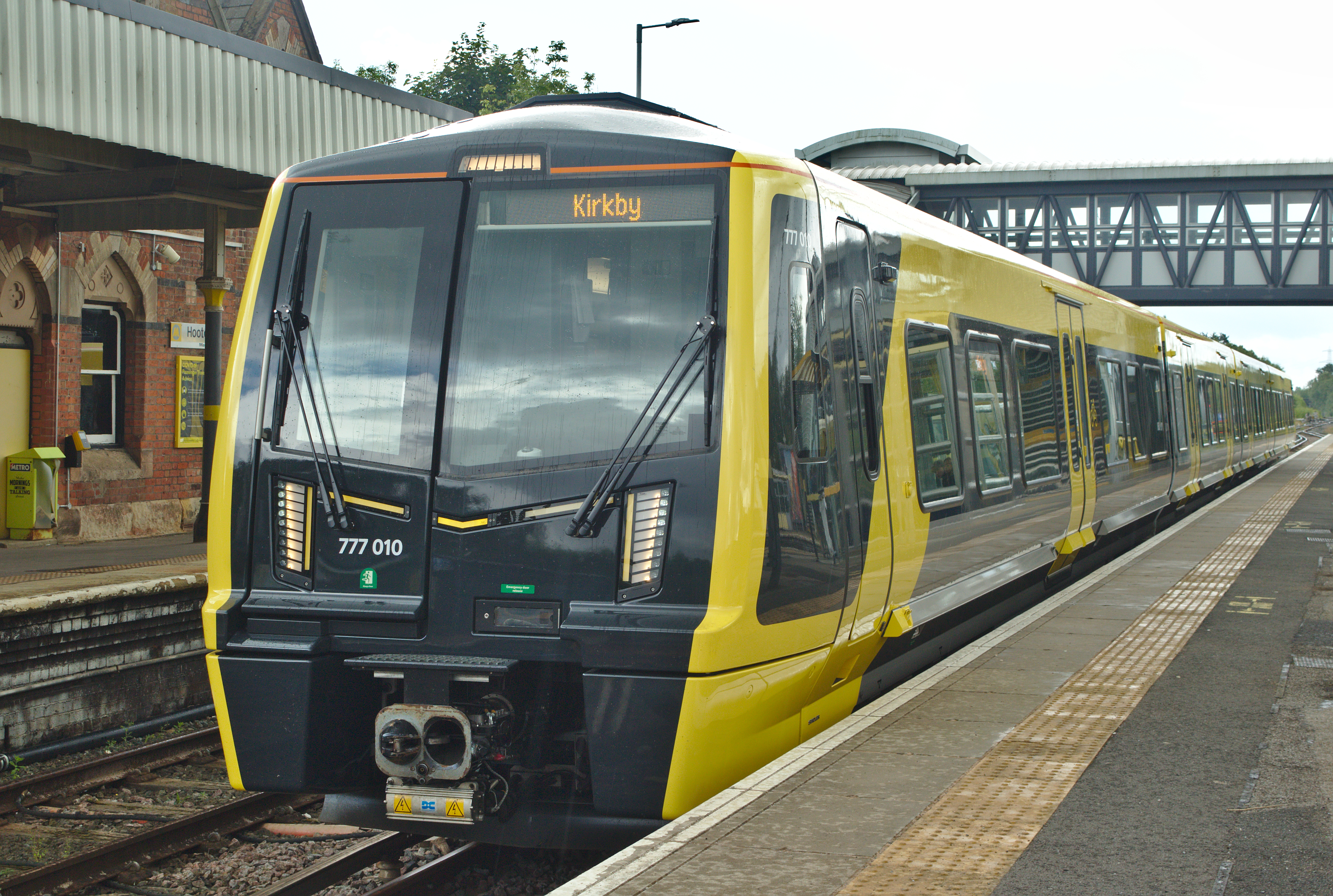
- A Class 777 at Hooton on the Wirral line

Overview
- Owner: Merseytravel, Network Rail
- Area served: Liverpool City Region and surrounding areas
- Locale: Liverpool City Region (Merseyside and Halton); Cheshire; Lancashire
- Transit type: Commuter rail
- Number of lines: 2
- Number of stations: 69 (67 managed (Note: Merseyrail managed 66 stations until 5 October 2023, when Headbolt Lane opened.))
- Annual ridership: 29.9 million (2024/2025)
- Chief executive: Neil Grabham
- Headquarters: Rail House, Liverpool
- Website: www.merseyrail.org

Operation
- Began operation: 1886 as the Mersey Railway, 1977 as expanded Merseyrail
- Operators: Merseyrail Electrics 2002 (50:50 joint venture between Serco and Transport UK Group)
- Infrastructure manager: Network Rail
- Character: Commuter rail, Concession
- Rolling stock: Class 777
- Number of vehicles: 53
- Train length: 4 cars, 8 cars during peak times
- Headway: 15 minutes (general), 5 minutes (central sections), 30 minutes (Ellesmere Port branch, general in evenings and on Sundays)

Technical
- System length: 122 km (76 miles)
- Track gauge: 4 ft 8 1/2 in (1,435 mm) standard gauge
- Electrification: 750 V DC third rail
System map

Merseyrail is a commuter rail network which serves Merseyside and adjacent areas of Lancashire and Cheshire in North West England. The network consists of two lines, the Northern Line and Wirral Line, which together serve 69 stations along 76 miles (122 km) of routes, of which 6.5 miles (10.5 km) are underground. It uses Class 777 trains based on the Stadler METRO platform, which primarily operate on 750 V DC third rail electrified track. The network carried 29.9 million passengers in 2024/2025. Since 2003 the network has been run as a concession, held by a 50:50 joint venture between Serco and Transport UK Group (previously Abellio UK).

Merseyrail was established in 1977, when existing railway lines were connected by constructing new tunnels under Liverpool city centre and Birkenhead. The network has since been expanded through the creation of new stations, the electrification of existing lines, and the use of trains capable of running on battery power; the last allow trains to reach Headbolt Lane despite the line leading to the station not being electrified.

== Network ==
Geographic map of the Merseyrail network, City line, and minor routes.
Northern line
Wirral line
MT City Lines
Primary route
Secondary route
Rural route
Goods line
Disused line

The Merseyrail network is primarily a self-contained network, operated by Merseyrail Electrics 2002 Limited, a Merseytravel concession, currently held as a 50:50 joint venture between Serco and Transport UK Group (previously Abellio and NedRailways). The concession was awarded to the venture by the Liverpool City Region Combined Authority and is overseen by Merseytravel, the passenger transport executive which co-ordinates public transport across the Liverpool City Region. Prior to the concession starting in July 2003, the network was run as Arriva Trains Merseyside.

Merseyrail manages 67 stations on the network.

The network consists of two halves, the Northern line and the Wirral line, both of which are mainly third-rail, powered by 750 V DC third rail system, with a small portion from Fazakerley to Headbolt Lane being run with BEMUs. Each service on both lines, with the exception of the Ellesmere Port Branch, has service frequencies of 15 minutes. The Ellesmere Port branch has a 30-minute frequency. Trains on the Northern line and Wirral line cover the Liverpool City Region. The total route length of the two lines is 120.7 km (75.0 miles), accommodating 69 stations. The lines connect Liverpool city centre with cities and towns on the outer reaches of the city region, such as Southport, Chester and Ormskirk.

The City Line, marked red on the network map, is operated by several other operators, such as Northern Trains, London Northwestern Railway, TransPennine Express, and others, with funding from Merseytravel. The City line is made up of several branches, which are mainly electrified with OHLE, but one branch, the Liverpool to Manchester line via Warrington, is operated by diesel trains.

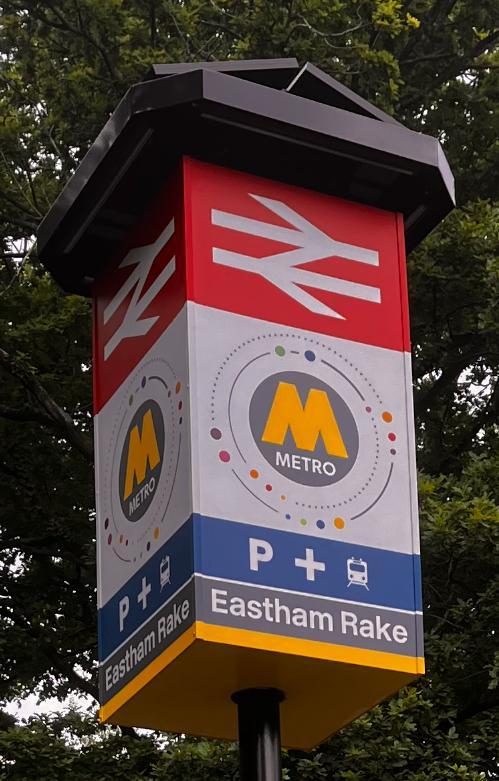
Merseyrail station sign at Eastham Rake station

The three lines interchange as follows:

- Northern and City line services interchange at Liverpool South Parkway and Hunts Cross in the south of the city.
- Wirral and City lines interchange at Lime Street in the city centre.
- Northern and Wirral lines interchange at Liverpool Central and Moorfields in the city centre.

=== Northern line ===

The Northern line is shown in blue on the Merseyrail and Merseytravel maps and denoted by the above wordmark on underground stations. Services operate on three main routes: from Hunts Cross in the south of Liverpool to Ormskirk via the Link tunnel from Brunswick station through central Liverpool, from Liverpool Central to Southport, and from Liverpool Central to Headbolt Lane via Kirkby. Each route operates a train every 15 minutes from Monday to Saturday, giving a frequent interval between trains on the central section. Some additional trains run at peak hours on the Southport line.

On matchdays at Liverpool F.C.'s Anfield, Northern line services connect with the SoccerBus service at Sandhills station to transport fans to the stadia. Bus departures are at frequent intervals from Sandhills station with ticketing to combine both modes of travel. Sandhills station is within walking distance of Everton FC's Hill Dickinson Stadium.

Connections to non-Merseyrail services are available at:

- Southport to Wigan Wallgate and Manchester Airport;
- Liverpool South Parkway for services operated by London Northwestern Railway, East Midlands Railway, TransPennine Express and Northern serving Birmingham New Street, Manchester Oxford Road, Blackpool North and various destinations within Yorkshire and the West Midlands;
- Hunts Cross to Warrington Central and Manchester Oxford Road;
- Ormskirk to Preston;
- Headbolt Lane to Blackburn via Wigan Wallgate and Manchester Victoria.

=== Wirral line ===

The Wirral line is shown in green on the Merseyrail and Merseytravel maps and denoted by the above wordmark on underground stations. Services operate from the four terminus stations of: Chester, Ellesmere Port, New Brighton and West Kirby. Each service from one of these the terminus stations runs through Birkenhead Hamilton Square underground station in Birkenhead, then through the Mersey Railway Tunnel, continuing around the single-track underground loop tunnel under Liverpool city centre. Trains head back into the Mersey Railway Tunnel to return to one of the four terminus stations.

Monday-Saturday services are every 15 minutes to/from Liverpool to Chester, New Brighton and West Kirby, and every 30 minutes to/from Ellesmere Port (Monday–Sunday). These combine to give a service at least every five minutes from Birkenhead Hamilton Square and around the loop under Liverpool city centre.

Connections to non-Merseyrail services are available at:

- Bidston on the West Kirby branch for the Borderlands line to Wrexham, operated by Transport for Wales;
- Chester to Crewe and London Euston, Wrexham and Shrewsbury, the North Wales Coast line to Llandudno and Holyhead, and to Manchester either via Warrington or via Northwich and Knutsford;
- Ellesmere Port for an infrequent service to and from Warrington;
- Liverpool Lime Street for intercity and regional trains to London Euston, Manchester, Birmingham, Wigan, Scotland, the Midlands and Wales.

=== Other related services ===
==== City Line ====

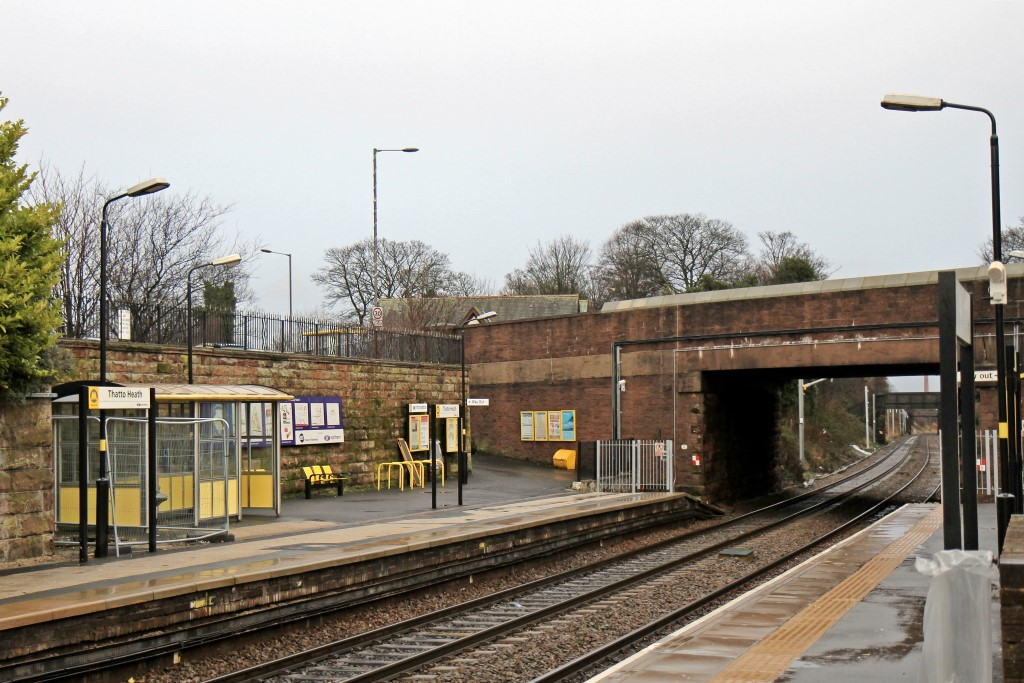
Thatto Heath station is branded Merseyrail with trains operated by Northern.

The City Line, or City Lines, is the brand name used by Merseytravel on services out of the mainline platforms of Liverpool Lime Street station to 26 stations on its sponsored network, and cross-boundary destinations outside the Liverpool City Region. Merseytravel has policies in place to improve the service frequency, to introduce new services and to invest in the City line. Despite the City Line being operated by other train operators than Merseyrail, as of 2000, it is marketed and branded as Merseytravel or Merseyrail to meet the passenger transport executive's aims to provide the network with a local identity and shared fare and ticketing structures. The line is depicted on signage and maps using the colour red and the above word mark, but unlike the other two lines without the term "Merseyrail".

Unlike the Northern and Wirral lines, the City line is not operated by Merseyrail. It is part of the Northern franchise and not the Merseyrail concession.

The City line covers the Liverpool City Region sections of the Crewe–Liverpool line, the two Liverpool–Manchester lines, and the Liverpool–Wigan line. Two services are not electrified, the Manchester via Warrington Central and Chester via Runcorn.

Northern mainly operate the City line with additional services operated by TransPennine Express, Avanti West Coast, East Midlands Railway, Transport for Wales, and West Midlands Trains.

== History ==
The history of Merseyrail dates back to the 19th century: the original formation of the Mersey Railway and the Mersey Railway Tunnel was among the first underground railway tunnels. The modern Merseyrail network was developed in the 1970s from lines that were previously owned by several different railway companies. The Beeching axe during the early 1960s closed key routes in and around Liverpool; the council proposed an alternate strategy and advocated the preservation of suburban services integrated into a new regional electrified rapid-transit network. The network underwent a period of electrification and expansion, becoming a single network in 1977, a major project being the Loop and Link line, creating a continuous underground route through Liverpool city centre.

Over the years, several new stations such as Conway Park in 1998 and Maghull North in 2017 have been added to the network. Most recently in 2023, Headbolt Lane has opened and is served on the network by battery-electric trains. Various proposals have been suggested on how to further expand the network, including beyond the Liverpool City Region area. Liverpool City Region Combined Authority announced in August 2019 that it was planning to use part of a £172 million funding package to reopen St James Station in Liverpool City Centre, officially confirmed as Liverpool Baltic station following a public vote in April 2022.

In August 2026 Merseyrail announced a ban on non-folding e-cycles, including station buildings, car parks and cycle storage facilities to start on 1 January 2027, saying that "safety considerations led us to introduce the ban", though approved mobility scooters and powered wheelchairs would continue to be allowed on the network. The ban is being challenged by Cycling UK.

== Services ==
Point-to-point or return tickets are purchased from staffed offices or ticket machines, but the system is tightly integrated with Merseytravel's City Region-wide pass system, which also encompasses the Mersey Ferries and city and regional bus networks. Merseytravel's smart ticketing is via the local MetroCard smartcard system, including Merseyrail travel.

Typical weekday off-peak service on the Merseyrail-run Northern and Wirral lines, as of May 2025, is as follows:

Northern line
Route	tph	Calling at
Hunts Cross to Ormskirk	4	Liverpool South Parkway, Cressington, Aigburth, St Michaels, Brunswick, Liverpool Central, Moorfields, Sandhills, Kirkdale, Walton, Orrell Park, Aintree, Old Roan, Maghull, Maghull North, Town Green, Aughton Park
Liverpool Central to Southport	4	Moorfields, Sandhills, Bank Hall, Bootle Oriel Road, Bootle New Strand, Seaforth & Litherland, Waterloo, Blundellsands & Crosby, Hall Road, Hightown, Formby, Freshfield, Ainsdale, Hillside, Birkdale
Liverpool Central to Headbolt Lane	4	Moorfields, Sandhills, Kirkdale, Rice Lane, Fazakerley, Kirkby
Wirral line
Route	tph	Calling at
Liverpool Central to New Brighton	4	Liverpool Lime Street (Liverpool-bound only), Moorfields (Liverpool-bound only), Liverpool James Street, Birkenhead Hamilton Square, Conway Park, Birkenhead Park, Birkenhead North, Wallasey Village, Wallasey Grove Road
Liverpool Central to West Kirby	4	Liverpool Lime Street (Liverpool-bound only), Moorfields (Liverpool-bound only), Liverpool James Street, Birkenhead Hamilton Square, Conway Park, Birkenhead Park, Birkenhead North, Bidston, Leasowe, Moreton, Meols, Manor Road, Hoylake
Liverpool Central to Chester	4	Liverpool Lime Street (Liverpool-bound only), Moorfields (Liverpool-bound only), Liverpool James Street, Birkenhead Hamilton Square, Birkenhead Central, Green Lane, Rock Ferry, Bebington, Port Sunlight, Spital, Bromborough Rake, Bromborough, Eastham Rake, Hooton, Capenhurst (2tph), Bache
Liverpool Central to Ellesmere Port	2	Liverpool Lime Street (Liverpool-bound only), Moorfields (Liverpool-bound only), Liverpool James Street, Birkenhead Hamilton Square, Birkenhead Central, Green Lane, Rock Ferry, Bebington, Port Sunlight, Spital, Bromborough Rake, Bromborough, Eastham Rake, Hooton, Little Sutton, Overpool

== Fleet ==
Merseyrail took over the fleet of Class 507 and 508 units from previous operator Arriva Trains Merseyside, which were refurbished by Alstom at Eastleigh Works between 2003 and 2005. The Class 507 and 508 have all since been withdrawn,the Class 508s in January 2024 and the Class 507s in November 2024. In 2020, rolling-stock manufacturer Stadler Rail delivered the first of a new fleet of 53 trains, designated Class 777, based on their Stadler METRO platform. Merseytravel has an option to purchase up to 60 additional units could be exercised if services are extended to new destinations such as Helsby, Skelmersdale or Wrexham.

The first Class 777 unit entered into service on the Northern line on 23 January 2023. Initially they were being used on the Kirkby route, followed by the Ormskirk route. The trains were introduced to the Wirral line, Ormskirk, Southport and Hunts Cross routes in late 2023. A small portion of the fleet are BEMUs, with these operating the services to Headbolt Lane station in Kirkby.

Merseyrail's fleet is maintained and stabled at Kirkdale TMD, Stadler's United Kingdom headquarters, and additionally units are stabled at Birkenhead North TMD, and Southport Carriage Holding Sidings.

During Merseyrail's history, there were several other depots, such as Hall Road TMD and Birkenhead Central TMD.

=== Current fleet ===
Class	Image	Type	Top speed		Number	Carriages	Routes operated	Built	In service
Class	Image	Type	mph	km/h	Number	Carriages	Routes operated	Built	In service
777 METRO		EMU; BEMU	75	120	53	4	All Northern line services; All Wirral Line services	2018–2021	2023–present

=== Past fleet ===
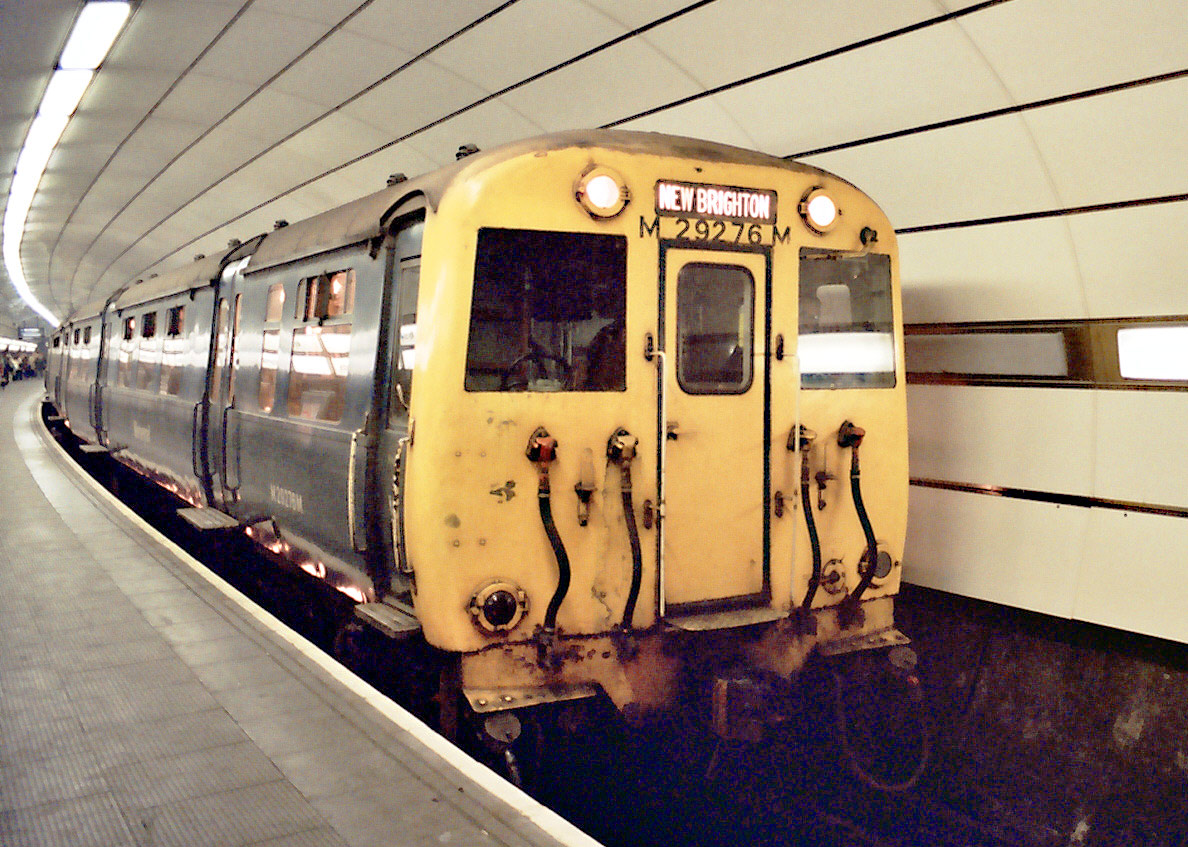
A Class 503 train on the Loop (Wirral) line. This train was one of the original batch built by the LMS in 1938

The original service on the Merseyrail lines was provided by the Class 502 on the Northern line and Class 503 on the Wirral line. The former was withdrawn by 1980 and the latter by 1985.

Introduced from 1978 and 1979 respectively were 33 Class 507 and 43 Class 508 units. Since the 1990s, 15 Class 508 units have been withdrawn as surplus and have later transferred to other operators with 12 units being transferred to Connex South Eastern and three units being transferred to Silverlink. Three additional Class 507 and 508 units, including unit 507006 after a crash at Kirkby in March 2021, were written off following their accidents. In 2023, further withdrawals of the trains began, having been replaced by the new Class 777.

In February 2024, the last Class 508 units were withdrawn, followed by the last Class 507 units in November.

Class	Image	Type	Top speed		Carriages	Number	Routes operated	Built	Withdrawn
Class	Image	Type	mph	km/h	Carriages	Number	Routes operated	Built	Withdrawn
507		EMU	75	120	3	33	All Northern line services; All Wirral line services	1978–1980	2022–2024
508		EMU	75	120	3	27	All Northern line services; All Wirral line services	1979–1980	2022-2024

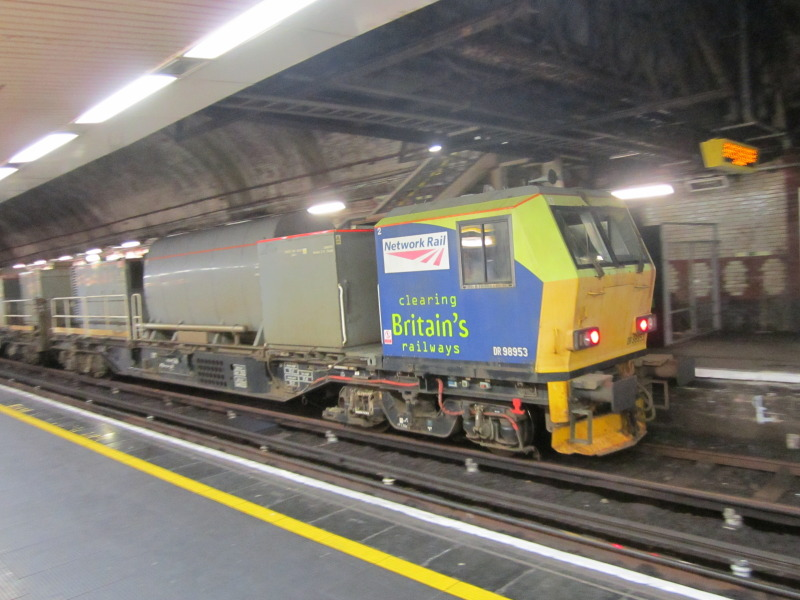
Modern departmental MPV at James Street – Unlike the London Underground and Tyne and Wear Metro, Merseyrail's track maintenance is the responsibility of Network Rail.

== Franchise and concession history ==
As a result of the privatisation of British Rail, the Northern and Wirral lines were brought together as the Merseyrail Electrics passenger franchise, being sold on 19 January 1997. Although franchises are awarded and administered on a national level (initially through various independent bodies, and later the Department of Transport directly), under the original privatisation legislation of 1993, passenger transport executives (PTEs) were co-signatories of franchise agreements covering their areas – this role being later modified by the Railways Act 2005.

The first train operating company awarded the Merseyrail Electrics franchise contract was MTL. MTL was originally the operating arm of Merseytravel but had been privatised in 1985. The brand name Merseyrail Electrics was adopted by MTL.

The Merseyrail name became the official brand for the network in the days of British Rail, surviving several franchise holders, although the name was not used by Arriva when holding the franchise. Despite this, Merseytravel continued the Merseyrail branding at stations, allowing the name to be adopted colloquially. With acquisition by Arriva, the train operating company was rebranded Arriva Trains Merseyside from 27 April 2001. Merseyrail is referred to as "Merseyrail Electrics" by National Rail Enquiries, and as "Serco/Abellio Merseyrail" by Merseytravel.

The City line was also privatised under the 1993 Act, but as part of a different, much larger North West Regional Railways (NWRR) franchise. Upon sale on 2 March 1997, the first train operating company awarded the NWRR franchise contract was North Western Trains (owned by Great Western Holdings). The train operating company was later bought by FirstGroup and rebranded First North Western.

The third-rail electric Northern and Wirral lines were largely isolated from the rest of the National Rail network with no through passenger services to or from outside the third-rail Merseyrail network. A decision was to transfer the network into exclusive Merseytravel control, being removed from the national franchising system. The Secretary of State exempted the two lines from being designated as a national railway franchise under the 1993 Act.

When the Merseyrail Electrics franchise was due for renewal, coming into force on 20 July 2003, Merseytravel contracted the operation of the two lines with a concession extending for up to 25 years. In October 2002, Merseytravel shortlisted three consortia; Keolis/GB Railways, Serco/NedRailways and Transdev/RATP to bid for a 25-year concession to operate the Merseyrail network. In April 2003 the contract was awarded to Merseyrail Electrics 2002 Limited, a 50:50 joint venture between Serco and NedRailways (renamed Abellio in 2009), with Merseyrail Electrics 2002 taking over from Arriva Trains Merseyside on 20 July 2003.

In August 2022, Abellio's 50% share in the business was included in the sale of its United Kingdom operations to Transport UK Group. Merseyrail Electrics 2002's contract expires on 20 July 2028.

The City line, which was largely diesel-operated at the time, was not included in the 2003 concession, continuing as a part of the nationally administered rail franchise system. From 11 December 2004, the NWRR franchise was merged into a new Northern franchise. The first train operating company awarded this franchise was Northern Rail, also owned by Serco and NedRailways. This franchise passed to Arriva Rail North on 1 April 2016 and then to Northern Trains on 1 March 2020.

Due to the isolation of the Northern and Wirral lines, Merseyrail Electrics 2002 Limited are keen to adopt vertical integration – taking responsibility for maintenance of the track from Network Rail.

== Performance ==
In February 2010, Merseyrail was named the most reliable operator of trains in the United Kingdom, with a reliability average of 96.33% during 2009–2010, the highest ever achieved by any United Kingdom train operator.

In 2023, Merseyrail was audited by the UK Government Office of Road & Rail; it found poor performance with 26.2% of trains being delayed by 4 or more minutes and a cancellation rate of 2.2%, an increase of 1.1% on the previous year.

In the year from April 2023 to March 2024, the network carried 28.3 million passengers over 511 million passenger kilometres, lower than the pre-COVID-19 peak of 30.6 million passengers over 556 million passenger kilometres in the year 2019–2020.

In 2025, the annual Transport Focus Rail User Survey gave Merseyrail an overall satisfaction score of 93%, with an 89% satisfaction rating for punctuality and reliability. Also in 2025, the company won a National Rail Award in the "Great Place to Work" category, with the judges commenting on the "good employee engagement" and "industry-leading flexible workplace initiatives". In 2026 it was named "Passenger Operator of the Year" in the National Rail Awards; the judges said that the company was "top of the class" for punctuality and reliability.

== Accidents and incidents ==
On 26 October 2005, a Merseyrail Class 508 train derailed in a tunnel on the approach to Liverpool Central underground station. All 119 passengers and train crew were evacuated safely; only the guard was injured. The cause was determined to be rail gauge spread caused by poor maintenance.

On 11 January 2007, a train ran through a buffer stop at West Kirby. Two people were injured.

On 30 June 2009, a train ran away at Kirkdale, running through a buffer stop and colliding with a wall. A passenger train had passed the site of the accident less than 5 seconds earlier. Merseyrail was fined £85,000 plus costs of £20,970.15 for offences under the Health and Safety at Work etc. Act 1974.

On 22 October 2011, an intoxicated teenage girl died after falling between the train and platform at James Street station. The train guard, Christopher McGee, was subsequently convicted of her manslaughter by gross negligence and was jailed for five years.

On 13 March 2021, a Merseyrail Class 507 train collided with the buffer stop at Kirkby station. The cause was found to be that the driver of the train was using a mobile phone whilst driving. The distraction led him to enter the station at nearly three times the permitted speed. He was sacked and prosecuted, pleading guilty in February 2022 to a charge of endangering the safety of people on the railway.

== See also ==
- List of underground stations of the Merseyrail network

Preceded by Arriva Trains Merseyside; Merseyrail Electrics franchise	Operator of Merseyrail concession 2003–2028	Incumbent
