= Merseytravel =

Transport authority for the Liverpool City Region, England

Coordinates: 53°24′13.9″N 2°59′33.9″W

- Formation: Transport Act 1968 (1 December 1969)
- Type: Public Body
- Purpose: Transport Executive
- Headquarters: Mann Island Buildings, Liverpool, England
- Region served: Liverpool City Region
- Committee Responsible: Transport Committee of the Liverpool City Region Combined Authority
- Director of Transport for Liverpool City Region: Jamie Ross
- Parent organization: Liverpool City Region Combined Authority
- Website: www.merseytravel.gov.uk

Merseytravel is a public transport body and the passenger transport executive of the Liverpool City Region Combined Authority responsible for delivering public transport and other transport functions in the Liverpool City Region. It was originally established on 1 December 1969 as the Merseyside Passenger Transport Executive

In July 2024, it was announced it is to be rebranded as Transport for Liverpool City Region (TfLCR) in the future, possibly by 2028.

== Governance ==
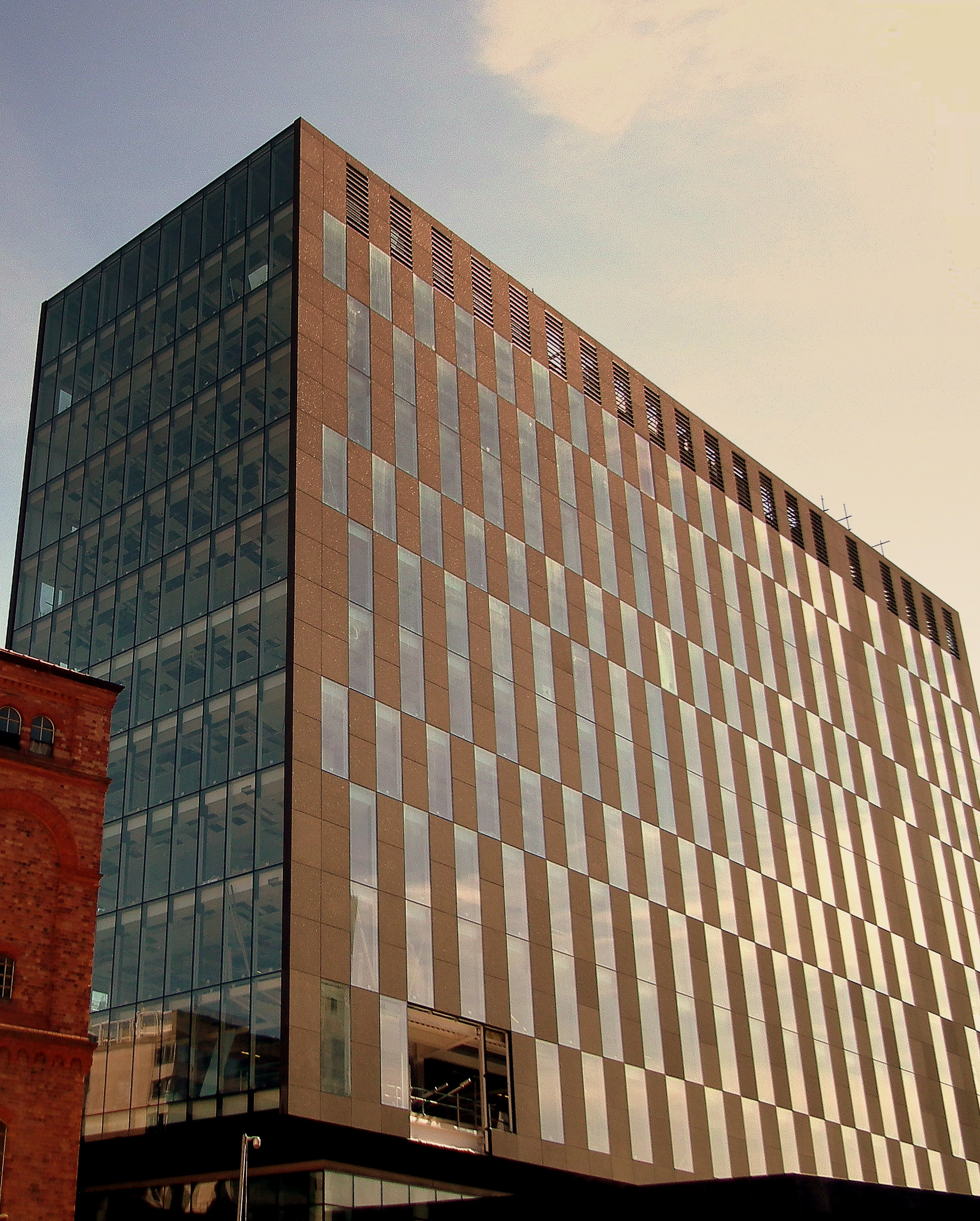
Merseytravel's Headquarters at No.1 Mann Island

The Merseyside Passenger Transport Authority and Merseyside Passenger Transport Executive were established as a result of the Transport Act 1968. The authority, which was responsible for transport strategy and policy, included representatives from 18 different councils. The passenger transport executive (PTE) was responsible for day-to-day operation of transport services. In 1974, when the transport organisation's boundaries were made co-extensive with the new metropolitan county of Merseyside which was formally created by the Local Government Act 1972, the authority was composed of 23 councillors of the new Merseyside County Council.

When the metropolitan county councils were abolished by the Local Government Act 1985, new structures had to be created. A new joint board - again called the Merseyside Passenger Transport Authority - was created. It was later renamed the Merseyside Integrated Transport Authority and composed 18 councillors assembled from Merseyside's five districts: Liverpool, Knowsley, St Helens, Sefton and Wirral.

On 1 April 2014, the Merseyside Integrated Transport Authority was abolished and reformed as the Merseytravel Committee of Liverpool City Region Combined Authority. The transport authority provides services across Merseyside, and provides strategic transport advice to Borough of Halton. In May 2021, Mayor Steve Rotherham set out a plan for all trains, buses and ferries to become an integrated transport system under Merseytravel, owned by the Liverpool City Region Combined Authority.

In 2024, the Liverpool City Region Combined Authority announced Merseytravel would be renamed to Transport for Liverpool City Region (TfLCR) to help fall in line with Transport for London and Transport for Greater Manchester, as part of efforts to promote a connected network across the six areas that form the city region. The actual date of the rename has not been confirmed, although by 2028 has been stated as a date following the roll out of Metro.

== Rail services ==
Merseyrail lines shown in Merseyside
Northern line
Wirral line
MT City Lines
Primary route
Secondary route
Rural route
Goods line
Disused line

Merseytravel, as the passenger transport executive, is responsible for the co-ordination of local rail services which operate within Liverpool City Region under the direction of the combined authority. Merseytravel is the owner of Merseyrail which operates services across Merseyside, Cheshire, and Lancashire under a franchise model.

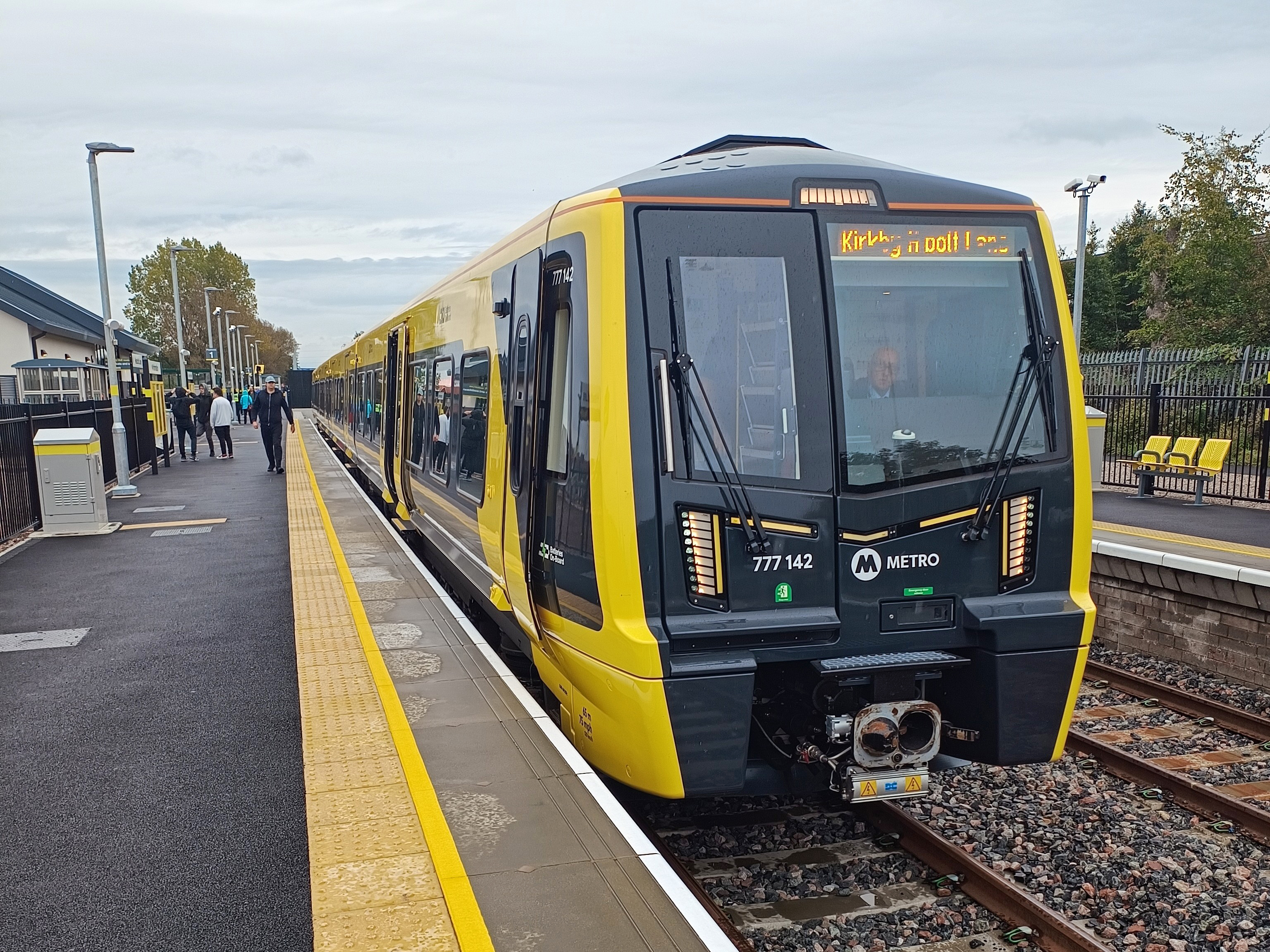
New Merseyrail Class 777 trains introduced on the network from 2023

=== Merseyrail ===
As a result of the privatisation of British Rail, the Northern and Wirral lines of the local Merseyrail rail network were brought together as the Merseyrail Electrics passenger franchise, that was privatised on 19 January 1997. Under the original privatisation legislation of 1993, PTEs were co-signatories of franchise agreements covering their areas. The first train operating company (TOC) awarded the franchise contract was MTL, originally the operating arm of the PTE, but privatised itself in 1985. It traded under the Merseyrail Electrics brand, but after MTL was sold to Arriva, the company was rebranded Arriva Trains Merseyside from 27 April 2001.

When the franchise came up for renewal, reflecting the exclusive nature of the two lines - being largely isolated from the rest of the National Rail network and with no through passenger services to/from outside the Merseyrail network, the decision was taken to remove it from the national framework and bring it into local control. As a result, using the Merseyrail Electrics Network Order 2002 the Secretary of State for Transport exempted the system from being designated as a railway franchise under the privatisation legislation (the Railways Act 1993). This allowed the PTE to contract out the lines themselves, which it did with Merseyrail operated by Serco-Abellio commencing a 25-year contract on 20 July 2003.

Unlike most rolling stock that is owned by private sector rolling stock companies, Merseytravel outright owns the Class 777 fleet, operated by Merseyrail.

=== Merseytravel City line ===
A third line, the City line, also historically branded as Merseyrail under British Rail, was also privatised under the 1993 Act, but as part of the much larger North West Regional Railways (NWRR) franchise. On 2 March 1997, North Western Trains, later rebranded First North Western, commenced operating the franchise. Some Class 142 units were repainted in Merseytravel's yellow livery. This line was not included in the 2003 exemption given to the other two lines, and so it has continued as part of the government-administered rail franchise system, although the role of PTEs in the franchising process has altered due by the 2005 Railways Act. From 11 December 2004, the NWRR franchise was merged into a new Northern franchise and operated by Northern Rail. The Merseyrail Class 142 units were repainted into Northern Rail livery. Since 2020, services have been operated by public-owned Northern Trains.

== Bus services ==
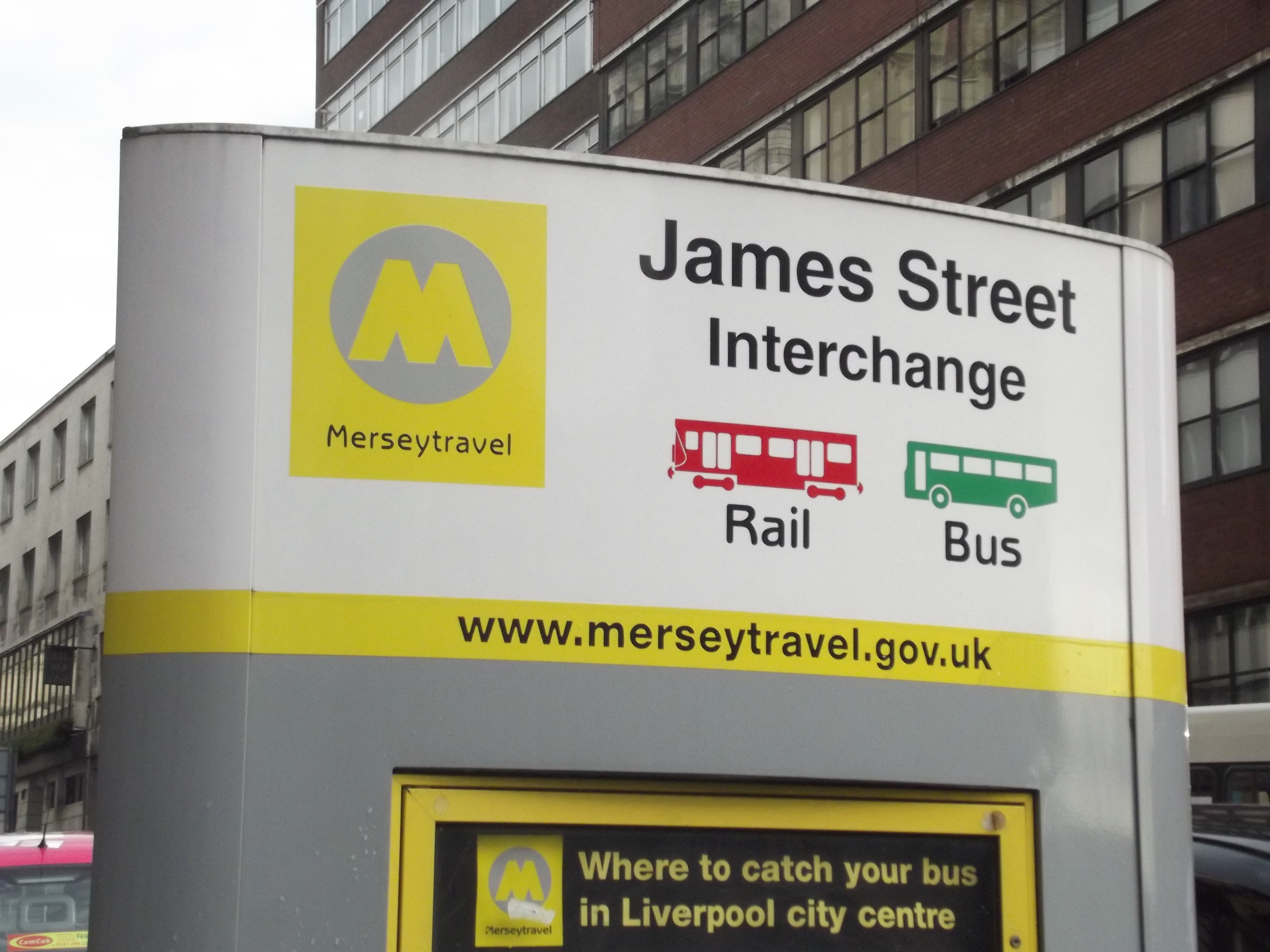
Merseytravel bus and rail sign on St James Street

From 1969 until 1986, the Merseyside Passenger Transport Executive (PTE) operated a large proportion of bus services on Merseyside under the Merseyside Transport brand. The PTE took over the provision of bus services in Liverpool, Birkenhead and Wallasey from their respective local authorities in 1970, and the bus services provided by St Helens and Southport councils in 1974. The PTE also coordinated and jointly provided bus services on Merseyside with National Bus Company subsidiaries Crosville and Ribble. These were services in Liverpool, Sefton and the Wirral, and longer-distance services to and from Cheshire and Lancashire. The PTE was also heavily involved in the running of Crosville and Ribble garages on Merseyside. Similar arrangements also existed with Lancashire United Transport/Greater Manchester Transport and Warrington Borough Transport from services connecting Merseyside with Cheshire, Greater Manchester and Lancashire.

The Transport Act 1985 mandated the deregulation and privatisation of bus services in England (other than in Greater London). Following deregulation in 1986, Merseyside Transport services were rebranded as Merseybus, and subsequently privatised as MTL. The co-ordination of Merseyside's bus network disappeared: Crosville, Ribble, now known as North Western and Greater Manchester's GM Buses, became competitors of Merseybus, along with new entrants like CMT Buses, Fareway, Halton Transport, Liverbus, Liverline, PMT's Red Rider, Village Group, and other smaller operators.

Merseyside's popular bus corridors became a venue for intense competition, with less profitable services ignored and, in some cases, disappearing. A period of consolidation began in the mid-1990s: both Merseybus parent company MTL, and North Western - now owned by Arriva – took over a number of the new entrants and the remainder folded. In 2000 MTL was itself bought by Arriva and is now part of an enlarged Arriva North West. However, Arriva was required by the Monopolies & Mergers Commission to divest some of its Liverpool services, which are now operated by Stagecoach Merseyside & South Lancashire. There are also smaller Merseyside operators like Cumfybus and HTL Buses.

Today, Merseytravel is also responsible for providing bus services which are considered socially necessary but are not profitable; these are operated by other operators, using a best value tendering system. Fares are presently subsidised at levels lower than local commercial services.

== Ferries and tunnels ==
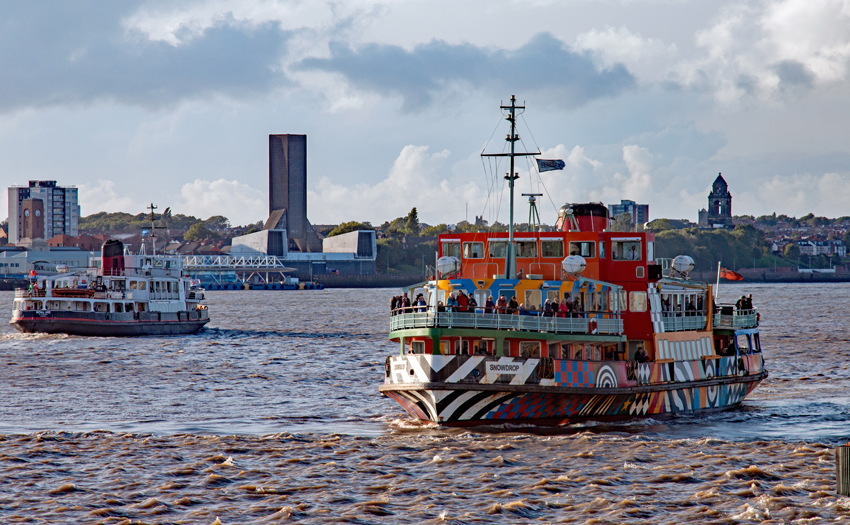
Royal Iris of the Mersey and Snowdrop in 2023

Merseytravel owns and operates the Mersey Ferry service between Liverpool Pier Head, Seacombe in Wallasey and Woodside in Birkenhead. The fleet consists of two vessels: Royal Iris of the Mersey and Snowdrop.

There are three transport tunnels under the River Mersey. Merseytravel is responsible for the two road tunnels, Kingsway and Queensway, and also controls the Mersey Tunnels Police. Merseyrail also runs through a railway tunnel under the river connecting central Liverpool and Birkenhead which was the first transport tunnel under the Mersey to be built, in the nineteenth century.

== Non-transport ventures ==
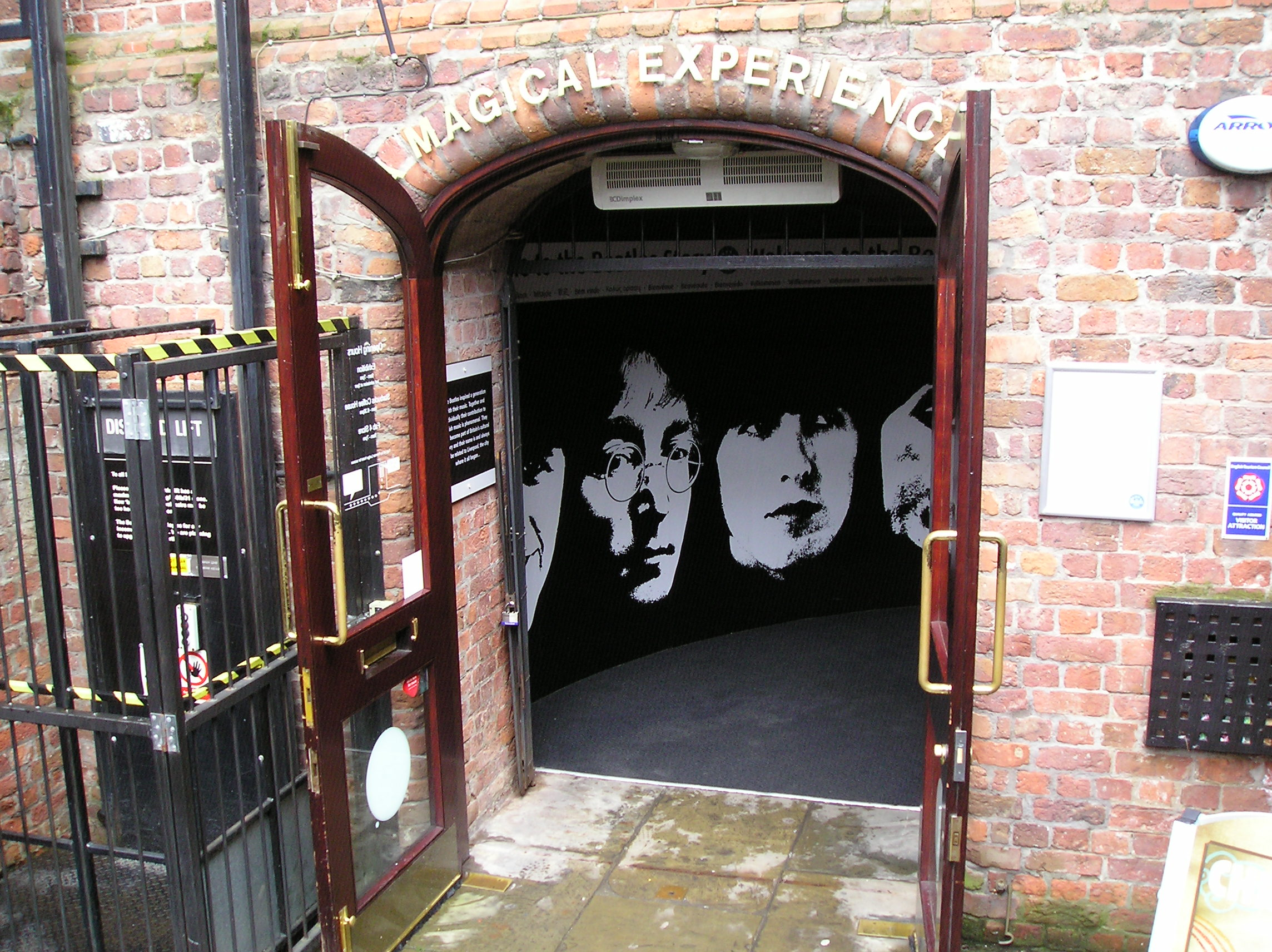
Entrance to The Beatles Story on Royal Albert Dock

Merseytravel, through Mersey Ferries, owns the Liverpool tourist attraction The Beatles Story, a museum dedicated to The Beatles located on Royal Albert Dock.

== Future projects ==
Neil Scales, the former chief executive and director general of Merseytravel, in his 2011 presentation "Growing the Railways on Merseyside," outlined future projects that Merseytravel may be involved in:

- Electrification of Bidston - Wrexham sections
- St Helens Junction, and Bootle - Aintree branch
- Further electrification between Hunts Cross - Warrington - Manchester, Headbolt Lane - Wigan and Ormskirk - Preston
- Liverpool F.C. football stadium access from the Bootle branch
- Re-investment in the Burscough Curves, linking Southport to Ormskirk and Preston
- Third rail electrification between Helsby and Ellesmere Port, (see Ellesmere Port to Warrington Line)

Merseytravel have also stated their support to linking Liverpool to the High Speed 2 network with a directly connected, brand new, twin-track line.

In September 2017, a report was compiled into the reopening of Liverpool St James railway station which concluded that the reopening of the station would be highly beneficial. It is due to open in 2027 under the name Liverpool Baltic railway station.

Liverpool City Region Combined Authority announced in August 2019 that they were planning on using £172 million of funding on several major transport projects. These included:

- Re-opening St James railway station
- Purchasing two low carbon Mersey ferries to replace the current ageing fleet

In 2023, a new ferry was commissioned. Making the announcement, Mayor Rotheram said that the multimillion project will “ensure that the iconic Ferry Cross the Mersey will continue to be enjoyed by generations to come.” The new ferry will be designed and constructed by Birkenhead shipbuilder Cammell Laird and is due to launch in 2026.

== Ticketing ==
Merseytravel are responsible for the management of local, reduced cost, integrated ticketing systems, and as part of this issue the ITSO-compatible MetroCard smartcard, on to which certain local travel passes are loaded. They are also the body responsible in the county of Merseyside for providing and funding concessionary travel for the elderly and disabled, through the English National Concessionary Bus Travel Scheme. For those not at the present pension age, but over 60, Merseytravel are funded to operate a localised version of the scheme for Merseyside residents only.

== See also ==
- Liverpool Tramways Company
- Merseytram
- Wirral Street Car
