= Grade II listed buildings in Liverpool-L4 =

Liverpool is a city and port in Merseyside, England, which contains many listed buildings. A listed building is a structure designated by English Heritage of being of architectural and/or of historical importance and, as such, is included in the National Heritage List for England. There are three grades of listing, according to the degree of importance of the structure. Grade I includes those buildings that are of "exceptional interest, sometimes considered to be internationally important"; the buildings in Grade II* are "particularly important buildings of more than special interest"; and those in Grade II are "nationally important and of special interest". Very few buildings are included in Grade I — only 2.5% of the total. Grade II* buildings represent 5.5% of the total, while the great majority, 92%, are included in Grade II.

Liverpool contains more than 1,550 listed buildings, of which 28 are in Grade I, 109 in Grade II*, and the rest in Grade II. (Note: These figures are taken from a search in the National Heritage List for England in May 2013, and are subject to variation as further buildings are listed, grades are revised, or buildings are delisted.) This list contains the Grade II listed buildings in the L4 postal district of Liverpool. This area lies to the northeast of the centre of the city, and is mainly residential. It also contains Stanley Park, and Anfield Cemetery, both of which contain listed buildings. Stanley Park and Anfield Cemetery both are registered in the National Register of Historic Parks and Gardens at Grade II*. The listed buildings in the park include bridges, walls, shelters, and pavilions. Those in the cemetery include the entrances, lodges, the catacombs, the chapel, the crematorium, and a monument. The postal district also contains part of Walton, formerly a separate town, and now a suburb of Liverpool. The listed building here include churches and associated buildings, houses, and public houses.

Grade II listed buildings from other areas in the city can be found through the box on the right, along with the lists of the Grade I and Grade II* buildings in the city.

== Buildings ==
Name	Location	Photograph	Built	Notes
Arnot St Mary Church of England Primary School	County Road; 53.442672°N 2.9696252°W		1893 - 91	Former Board school, by Edmund Kirby, architect, and constructed by Joshua Henshaw and Sons, builders, both of Liverpool. Built for the Walton-On-The-Hill School Board in red Ruabon and brown brick.
Cherry Lane Entrance	Anfield Cemetery; 53.43993°N 2.95170°W		1864	The entrance was designed by Lucy and Littler. It enters the cemetery by way of a bridge under a railway. It is in stone, and incorporates castellated portals, each with a small tower. The carriageway, and the flanking pedestrian ways, pass under Gothic arches, and contain iron gates.
Crematorium	Anfield Cemetery; 53.4360°N 2.9579°W		1894–96	The crematorium was designed by James Rhind in free Perpendicular style. It was the fourth crematorium to be built in the country, and was re-ordered in 1953. It is constructed in stone with a slate roof, and has a T-shaped plan, with a south porch and a north wing. What appears to be a northwest tower is a disguised chimney; this has an embattled parapet with gargoyles, and louvered bell openings.
McLennan Monument	Anfield Cemetery; 53.43874°N 2.95839°W		1893	The monument to Alexander McLennan and his wife is in the form of an Egyptian pylon. It is constructed in granite, and has buttresses, a frieze, and Egyptian-style decoration.
North Catacomb	Anfield Cemetery; 53.4398°N 2.9571°W		c. 1863	Designed by Lucy and Littler, the part above is built in stone with a slate roof. Its features include buttressed arcades, and a corbelled parapet with gargoyles. When in use, coffins were lowered on stone catafalques by hydraulic lift.
Main Entrance, Priory Road/Walton Lane	Anfield Cemetery; 53.43781°N 2.96323°W		1862	The entrance contains a red sandstone screen designed by Lucy and Littler. In the centre is an octagonal Gothic clock tower, surmounted by a gable with a pinnacle. Flanking the tower are iron gates, outside which are gate piers with truncated spires. Between the piers are pedestrian ways, above which are iron canopies.
Priory Road Entrance (south)	Anfield Cemetery; 53.43597°N 2.95905°W		c. 1862	The entrance consists of four gate piers with gates, designed by Lucy and Littler. The gate piers are in stone with moulded bases and pyramidal finials. The gates are in wrought iron and are richly ornamented.
South Catacomb	Anfield Cemetery; 53.4382°N 2.9563°W		c. 1863	Designed by Lucy and Littler, the part above is built in stone with a slate roof. Its features include buttressed arcades, and a corbelled parapet with gargoyles. When in use, coffins were lowered on stone catafalques by hydraulic lift.
South Chapel	Anfield Cemetery; 53.4369°N 2.9573°W		c. 1862	The only surviving chapel of the three designed for the cemetery by Lucy and Littler. It is built in stone with a slate roof, and is in Gothic Revival style. The chapel consists of a nave with an apse, aisles, and porches. Above the north porch is a tower, with buttresses, loured bell openings, gargoyles, and a spire incorporating lucarnes and pinnacles.
Walton Lane Entrance	Anfield Cemetery; 53.44080°N 2.96192°W		c. 1862	The entrance gate and gate piers were designed by Lucy and Littler. There are four stone gate piers with pyramidal finials. The wrought iron gates are richly ornamented.
Woodlands, Anfield County Girls Secondary School	Anfield Road; 53.4332°N 2.9658°W		Early 19th century	Built as a house, later extended to form a school, it is a stuccoed building with a slate roof. It has two storeys, and is in four bays. The windows are a mix of sashes and casements, with a bay window at the rear. The porch has flat pilasters and an entablature.
Lodge to Stanley Park	Anfield Road; 53.4331°N 2.9673°W		1868	This is located at the Anfield Road entrance to Stanley Park. The lodge was designed by E. R. Robson, and is built in sandstone with slate roofs. There are two storeys, with a front of three bays, and sides of two bays. Most of the windows are mullioned. On the left side is a two-storey bay window.
Roseneath Cottage	5 Anfield Road; 53.4330°N 2.9654°W		Early 19th century	The cottage is constructed in sandstone with a slate roof. It has two storeys and casement windows. The porch has an architrave and a castellated parapet.
—	9 and 11 Anfield Road; 53.4332°N 2.9651°W		c. 1840	A pair of semi-detached houses, with an extension to No. 11. No. 9 is stuccoed, and No. 11 is pebbledashed. The houses are in two storeys with an attic and two steep gables, and stretch for six bays. The windows are casements or 20th-century replacements.
—	35 and 37 Anfield Road; 53.4328°N 2.9625°W		Mid 19th century	A pair of stuccoed semi-detached houses with a slate roof. The houses are in two storeys with attics. Each house is in two bays and has a gable. They both have canted bay windows with embattled crests. All the windows are 20th-century casements.
—	39 and 41 Anfield Road; 53.4327°N 2.9623°W		Mid 19th century	A pair of stuccoed semi-detached houses with a slate roof. The houses are in two storeys with attics. Each house is in two bays and has a gable. They both have canted bay windows with embattled crests. All the windows are 20th-century casements.
—	43 and 45 Anfield Road; 53.4327°N 2.9621°W		Mid 19th century	A pair of stuccoed semi-detached houses with a slate roof. The houses are in two storeys with attics. Each house is in two bays and has a gable. They both have canted bay windows with embattled crests. All the windows are 20th-century casements.
The Arkles Public House	Arkles Lane; 53.4303°N 2.9575°W		1880s	The public house is constructed in yellow brick with red brick and stone dressings and a slate roof. It has two storeys and an attic, and is in three bays in the front and at the sides. Its features include friezes, mullioned windows, and a clock tower with a pyramidal roof.
—	59–73 Barlow Lane; 53.4384°N 2.9724°W		Early to mid 19th century	A terrace of eight brick cottages with stone dressings and a slate roof. They have two storeys, and each cottage is in two bays. Some of the cottages have sash windows, others have casement windows, all under wedge lintels.
Holy Trinity Church	Breck Road, Anfield; 53.4261°N 2.9515°W		1847	Church, 1847 by J. Hay; stone with slate roof. Nave, transepts and short chancel, ritual west tower.
St John the Evangelist's Church	Fountains Road; 53.4335°N 2.9787°W		1885	A Roman Catholic church designed by J. and B. Sinnot. It is in sandstone with a slate roof. The church consists of a nave and chancel with no internal division, transepts, and chapels. At the southeast corner is a stair turret, and a belfry with a small pyramidal roof. The east window has seven lights, and the west window has five.
St Columba's Church	Pinehurst Road; 53.4337°N 2.9503°W		1931–32	The church was designed by Bernard A. Miller, and is constructed in silvery-grey brick with a green pantile roof. It consists of a nave, transepts, and a chancel with a chapel and a vestry. At the northwest is a bellcote with a shaped gable. The windows are lancets.
Lansdowne House	Priory Road; 53.4369°N 2.9609°W		c. 1862	Originally the registrar's office for Anfield Cemetery, it was designed by Lucy and Littler. It is built in stone with a slate roof, and has an irregular plan. The building is in two storeys and has a front of five bays. The front contains gables, and there are bay windows on the front and back. Otherwise the windows are placed irregularly, and are mullioned.
Lodge (north)	238 Priory Road; 53.43600°N 2.95881°W		1862	The lodge for Anfield Cemetery was designed by Lucy and Littler. It is constructed in stone, and has a slate roof. The building has an L-shaped plan, with a porch in the angle, and has two storeys. It contains an oriel window in the ground floor. There is also an octagonal staircase turret, with a lancet window, an embattled parapet, and a spire with fleuron.
Lodge south of main entrance to Anfield Cemetery	242 Priory Road; 53.43772°N 2.96294°W		1862	The lodge for Anfield Cemetery was designed by Lucy and Littler. It is constructed in stone and has a hipped slate roof. The building is in one storey with an attic. There are two bays on all sides. The bay to left of the entrance projects forward; it has a canted bay window with a gable above.
Kirkdale Community Centre	Stanley Road, Kirkdale; 53.4338°N 2.9851°W		1886	This was built as the Gordon Working Lads Institute, and was designed by David Walker in Renaissance Revival style. It is built in common brick with red brick dressings, and has a slate roof. It is in two storeys with an attic, and has a front of nine bays and sides of five bays. Its front is elaborately decorated, including its gables, some of which are shaped, and others are stepped.
Bandstand	Stanley Park; 53.43386°N 2.96742°W		1899	The bandstand is in cast iron, and has an octagonal roof with a decorative peak. This is carried on eight thin iron columns.
Boathouse	Stanley Park; 53.43652°N 2.96271°W		1870	The boathouse is on the east side of the lake, and was designed by E. R. Robson in Gothic style. It is in sandstone, and consists of a small square single-storey building with a Gothic arched entry facing the lake and a flat roof, Originally on the roof was a timber pavilion, but this was destroyed by fire in the late 20th century. Railings have been placed around the roof which acts as a view point. A flight of steps leads down into the boathouse, and two flights lead up to the roof.
Bridge	Stanley Park; 53.43672°N 2.96287°W		1870	The bridge is located to the northwest of the boathouse to the east of the lake. It was designed by E. R. Robson, and consists of iron girders supporting iron railings between stone piers. The space under the bridge has been filled in.
Bridge	Stanley Park; 53.43694°N 2.96406°W		c. 1870	This bridge is to the north of the east end of the lake. It was designed by E. R. Robson, and consists of stone abutments supporting iron girders with iron rails. At the ends of the bridge are stone piers.
Bridge	Stanley Park; 53.43653°N 2.96223°W		c. 1870	The bridge is located to the east of the boathouse. It was designed by E. R. Robson, and consists of iron girders supporting iron railings between stone piers. The space under the bridge has been filled in.
Bridge	Stanley Park; 53.43645°N 2.96421°W		c. 1870	The bridge is located to the east end of the lake. It was designed by E. R. Robson, and consists of iron girders supporting iron railings between stone abutments. At the ends of the bridge are stone piers.
Bridge	Stanley Park; 53.43654°N 2.96617°W		Late 19th century	The bridge crosses the lake. It is in stone, and consists of six dentilled arches carried on piers. Alternate piers have projecting refuges supported by corbels. The parapet contains recessed panels.
Conservatory	Stanley Park; 53.4337°N 2.9670°W		1899	Designed by Mackenzie and Moncur, the conservatory is a structure in iron and glass on a stone base. It has 15 bays on the front and back, and seven bays on the sides. On top is a clerestory and a hipped roof.
Pavilion (east of screen wall)	Stanley Park; 53.43418°N 2.96337°W		1870	The pavilion is sited at the east end of the main section of the screen wall. It is built in stone with a slate roof and has an octagonal plan. Each side contains a two-bay arcade with a central column. On the top is a lantern with five lights on each side.
Pavilion (west of screen wall)	Stanley Park; 53.43398°N 2.96616°W		1870	The pavilion is sited at the west end of the main section of the screen wall. It is built in stone with a slate roof and has an octagonal plan. Each side contains a two-bay arcade with a central column. On the top is a lantern with five lights on each side.
Screen wall	Stanley Park; 53.43390°N 2.96282°W		1870	The stone wall has a central section, and two side sections meeting the central section at narrow angles. It was designed by E. R. Robson. Along the wall is blind arcading and buttresses with conical pinnacles. The central section contains a rectangular pavilion.
Shelter (east)	Stanley Park; 53.43449°N 2.95791°W		c. 1870	This is located at the east end of the park. It was designed by E. R. Robson, and is in cast iron. The shelter has a front of three bays, with a single bay at the sides, the corner bays being canted. Composite columns support pierced arch braces and a hipped roof.
Shelter (southeast)	Stanley Park; 53.43622°N 2.96562°W		1870	This is located to the southeast of the lake. It was designed by E. R. Robson, and is built in stone. It has a hexagonal plan, with a six-sided base in the centre, but no seats. The timber roof is carried on round columns with pointed arches, and has a lantern with a pyramidal roof.
Terrace	Stanley Park; 53.43434°N 2.96483°W		c. 1870	The terrace runs along the top of the bowling greens, and has a long sandstone wall. This has a rusticated base and small buttresses. At the ends are canted projections, in the centre is a rectangular projection, and between these on each side are bowed projections.
St Mary's Church	Walton; 53.4463°N 2.9668°W		1829–32	Although it was the ancient parish church of Liverpool, the oldest existing part is the west tower. Alterations were made to the church in the 1840s and in 1911. In 1940 the body of the church was destroyed by incendiary bombs, and was rebuilt in 1947–53. The exterior appears as it did formerly, but the interior is modern.
St Mary's Churchyard Wall and Entrances	Walton; 53.44627°N 2.96766°W		19th century	A sandstone wall surrounding the churchyard of St Mary's. It contains three entrances, each with gabled stone piers containing an overthrow with a lantern. Incorporated in the wall facing County Road is a drinking fountain.
Hearse house, St Mary's Churchyard	Walton; 53.44622°N 2.96630°W		Early 19th century	The hearse house is constructed in stone, but only its façade has survived. It has an entrance under a pointed arch, and at the top is a cornice with crenellations.
Mortuary, St Mary's Churchyard	Walton; 53.44623°N 2.96622°W		Early 19th century	Only the façade of the mortuary remains. It is in rusticated stone, standing on a plinth. At the top is a pediment with a cornice and acroteria. There is a blocked window in the tympanum.
Sundial, St Mary's Churchyard	Walton; 53.44607°N 2.96691°W		Early 18th century	The sundial consists of a baluster on a square base. The gnomon is missing.
Old School House	Walton; 53.44574°N 2.96711°W		17th century	The house, later used as a scout hut, stands inside the churchyard of St Mary's Church. It is constructed in stone, with a stone slate roof. The building has three storeys, with three bays on the front and two bays on the sides. There is a single-bay extension to the rear. The windows are mullioned, containing casements. The doorway has a Tudor arch.
Milepost	Walton Lane; 53.44087°N 2.96219°W		1865	The cast iron milepost was erected by the Liverpool Health Committee. It records the exact distance from Liverpool Town Hall and the height above Old Dock Sill.
Rainbow House	County Road; 53.442674°N 2.9705135°W		c. 1890	Former School Board offices, now a nursery school, minor late C20 alterations. By Edmund Kirby, architect, of Liverpool, for the Walton-On-The-Hill School Board. In red Ruabon brick.
Glebe Hotel, County Road	Glebe Hotel; 53.444699°N 2.9691143°W		c 19th	Public house in stone with slate roof, three storeys. Three by three bays with canted corner bay. Ornamented bands and cornices between storeys, the name carved in the parapet.
Lodge	304 Walton Lane; 53.43796°N 2.96305°W		1862	The lodge to the south end of the entrance to Anfield Cemetery was designed by Lucy and Littler. It is constructed in stone, and has a slate roof. The building has an L-shaped plan, with a porch in the angle, and has one storey with an attic. It contains an oriel window in the ground floor. Above this is another window, over which are the arms of Liverpool. Above the entrance to the porch is inscribed the word "SEXTON".
Post Office	1 Walton Road; 53.4306°N 2.9769°W		1905	Constructed in brick with stone dressings and a slate roof, the building has a central block of two storeys with an attic in three bays and, on each side, a single-storey wing, one of four bays and one of six. All the windows are sashes. Other features include Diocletian windows, windows with architraves, and coped gables with round windows. In the central block are windows flanked by Ionic columns, above which is an open pediment containing a cartouche and a segmental parapet.
-	63 Walton Road; 53.43225°N 2.97399°W		1830s	1830s house in brick with stone dressings, slate roof. 3 storeys, 3 bays; end bay breaks forward under left half of pediment. 1st floor sill band and top cornice. Windows have wedge lintels, some are sashed, some have casements. Central entrance has enclosed porch with paired Ionic columns supporting entablature; entrance in right return has architrave. Iron balcony over porch. Currently (2019) used as a dental surgery.
Old Rectory	Walton Village; 53.4455°N 2.9645°W		c. 1800	A porte-cochère was added in about 1830. The house is in stone with a slate roof, and has three storeys. There are seven bays on the front and back, and three on the sides. On the north side is an octagonal stair turret. The gables and parapet are embattled, and the windows are sashes. The porte-cochère has three Tudor arches, buttresses rising to turrets, and finials.
Police and Fire Station	Westminster Road; 53.4356°N 2.9748°W		1885	This was designed by Thomas Shelmerdine, and consisted of a police station, a fire station and a bridewell. It has a complex plan, and is built in brick with sandstone dressings and slate roofs. The windows are mullioned and transomed. Arising from the roof of the former police station is a tiled spire.

== See also ==
Architecture of Liverpool
