= KKD =

KKD may refer to:

- Kirkcudbrightshire, historic county in Scotland, Chapman code
- Krispy Kreme Doughnuts Inc., NYSE stock symbol until 2016
- Kirkdale railway station, Liverpool, England, National Rail station code
