= St Mary's Church, Walton-on-the-Hill =

Coordinates: 53.4463°N 2.9668°W

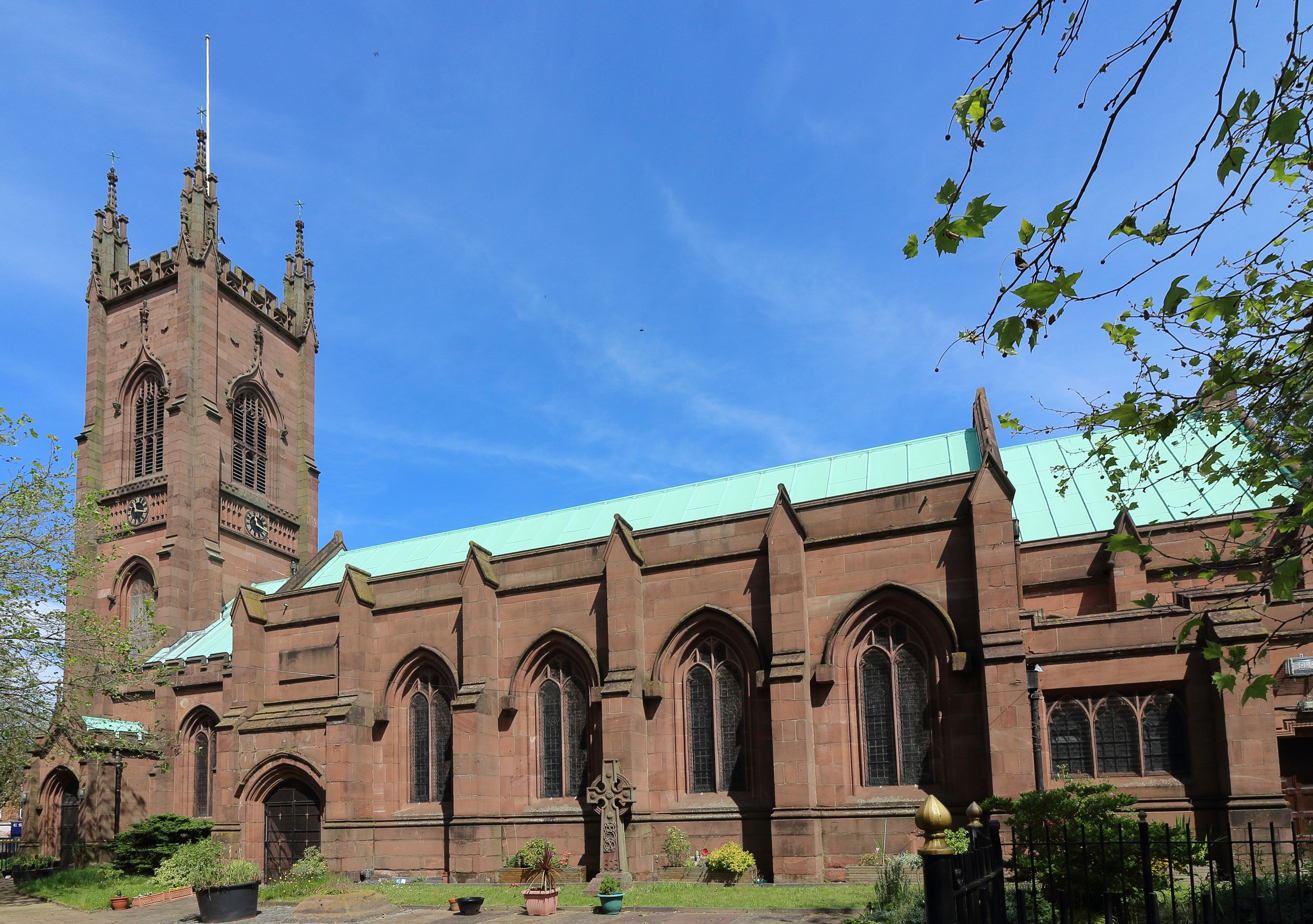
- St Mary's from the southeast

- Location in Merseyside
- OS grid reference: SJ 359 948
- Location: Walton, Liverpool, Merseyside
- Country: England
- Denomination: Anglican
- Churchmanship: Anglo-Catholicism
- Website: St Mary, Walton-on-the-Hill

History
- Status: Parish church

Architecture
- Functional status: Active
- Heritage designation: Grade II
- Designated: 28 June 1952
- Architect: John Broadbent (tower)
- Architectural type: Church
- Style: Gothic Revival

Specifications
- Materials: Stone

Administration
- Province: York
- Diocese: Liverpool
- Archdeaconry: Liverpool
- Deanery: Walton
- Parish: Walton-on-the-Hill

Clergy
- Rector: Revd Fiona Pennie
- Priest: Revd Jean Flood

St Mary's Church is in Walton (formerly Walton-on-the-Hill), Liverpool, Merseyside, England. It is an active Anglican parish church in the deanery of Walton, the archdeaconry of Liverpool and the diocese of Liverpool. Its benefice is united with those of St Nathanael, Walton-on-the-Hill, and St Aidan, Walton-on-the-Hill, to form the Walton Team Ministry. The church is recorded in the National Heritage List for England as a designated Grade II listed building.

== History ==
St Mary's was originally the parish church of the Hundred of West Derby and of the area containing what was to become the city of Liverpool. A church on the site is mentioned in the Domesday Book; this was rebuilt in 1326. The nave was rebuilt in 1741, followed by the chancel in 1810. None of this has survived, the oldest part of the present church being the west tower, which was built in 1829–32 to a design by John Broadbent, a pupil of Thomas Rickman. The north side of the church was remodelled in 1840, and the chancel was rebuilt in 1843. In 1911 a south aisle, incorporating a chapel, an ambulatory, and a vestry were added by Nagington and Shennan. Most of the church, apart from the tower, was destroyed by incendiary bombs in the May Blitz of 1941. The body of the church was rebuilt between 1947 and 1953 by Quiggin and Gee, retaining the exterior as before, but creating a new interior. It is now open to visitors to allow them to view aspects of the church that date back to the Norman era.

== Architecture ==
=== Exterior ===
The church consists of a five-bay nave with north and south porches, a south aisle continuing to the east as a chapel, a four-bay chancel with a vestry, and a west tower. The tower is in Perpendicular style, and is in four stages. It has angle buttresses rising to pinnacles, three-light windows, and a clock face on each side. In the top stage are three-light louvred bell openings. Around the summit is an embattled parapet with pierced tracery. At the east end of the church is a five-light window.

=== Interior ===
Inside the church are concrete vaults on a steel frame. At the west end is a stone gallery carried on three arches. In the chapel is a reredos that includes a copy of the Deposition of Christ by Fra Angelico, executed in 1860 by Vincenzo Corsi; this was formerly in Haigh Hall. The sandstone font is Norman but damaged. It is large and circular, and has carved panels depicting biblical scenes. The font was broken into pieces in 1941 and restored by E. Carter Preston, who also designed the stained glass in the church. At the east end of the church is a fragment of an Anglo-Saxon cross shaft.

== External features ==
Associated with the church are four structures also listed at Grade II. The sandstone churchyard wall dates from the 19th century. There are three entrances with stone piers; all originally had iron overthrows supporting lanterns, but only one has survived. In the west section of the wall is a red granite drinking fountain. This was added in 1861 and paid for by Charles Pierre Melly; it is one of the earliest drinking fountains in England. In the churchyard, to the south of the church, is a sundial dating from the late 17th or the early 18th century. It consists of a baluster on a square step; the gnomon is missing. In the east wall of the churchyard is a former sandstone hearse house, of which only the façade remains. It dates from the early 19th century, it has a pointed entrance and a cornice, and is crenellated. To the left of the hearse house is a former mortuary. This is also in sandstone, dates from the early 19th century, and, again, only the façade remains. It has a pediment with a cornice and acroteria.

== See also ==
- Grade II listed buildings in Liverpool-L4
- Walton Hall, Liverpool
