= Rice Lane railway station =

Railway station on the Kirkby Branch of the Northern Line in Liverpool, England

Rice Lane
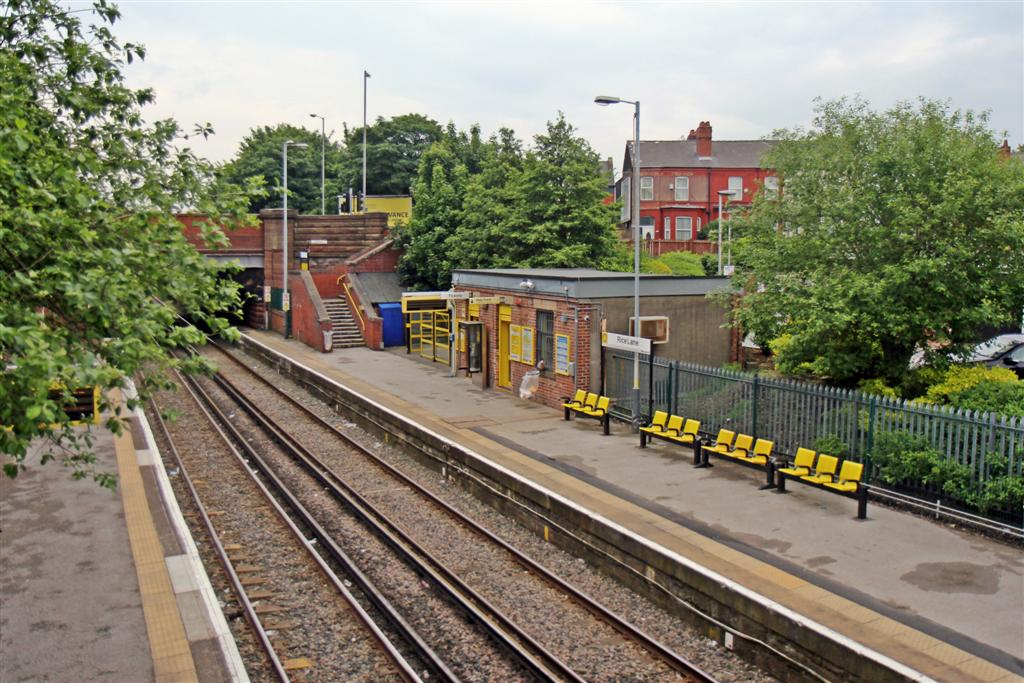
- A view of the ticket office, from the footbridge.

General information
- Location: Walton, Liverpool; England
- Coordinates: 53.4576°N 2.9628°W
- Grid reference: SJ361960
- Manager: Merseyrail
- Transit authority: Merseytravel
- Platforms: 2

Other information
- Station code: RIL
- Fare zone: C1

Key dates
- 20 November 1848: Opened as Preston Road
- 14 May 1984: Renamed Rice Lane

Passengers
- 2021/22: ▲0.417 million
- 2022/23: ▲0.504 million
- 2023/24: ▼0.453 million
- 2024/25: ▼0.423 million
- 2025/26: ▲0.490 million
Location
Notes
- Passenger statistics from the Office of Rail and Road

Rice Lane railway station is a railway station in Liverpool, England, located to the north of the city centre in the Walton district. It is on the Kirkby branch of the Merseyrail network's Northern Line.

The station was opened on 20 November 1848, and was known as Preston Road until 14 May 1984. It is located just to the north of Walton Junction, where the Kirkby and Ormskirk branches of the Northern line diverge; Walton (Merseyside) station on the Ormskirk line is close by (5 minutes away on foot along Hornby Road).

== Facilities ==
Rice Lane is staffed throughout day, as is the norm for Merseyrail stations (15 minutes before start of service until 00:20, seven days per week). The ticket office is located on the Liverpool-bound platform and there are shelters on each side, along with digital information screens and timetable posters. Automated train running announcements are also provided. No step-free access is offered, as the only way to reach the platforms is via a staircase from the road after which the station is named (the two platforms being linked by a stepped footbridge).

== Services ==
The station is currently served by four trains per hour in each direction during the day time Monday - Saturday. In late evenings and on Sundays services are reduced to two trains per hour in each direction. Services are operated using Class 777 BEMUs.

Preceding station	National Rail	Following station
Fazakerley towards Headbolt Lane	Merseyrail Northern Line	Kirkdale towards Liverpool Central

== Gallery ==
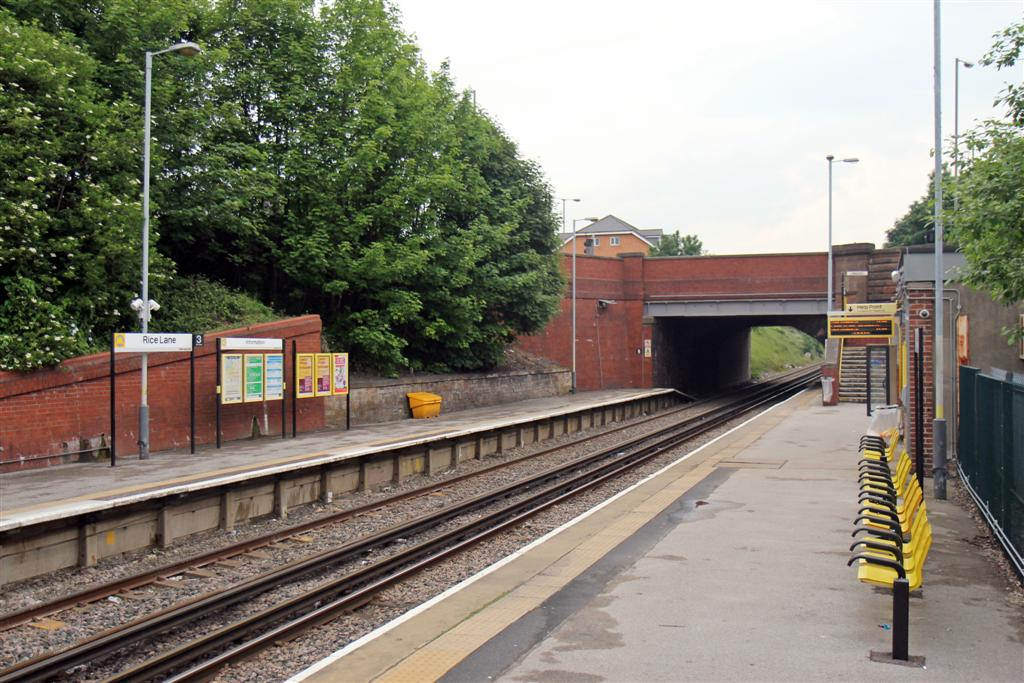
The A59 road bridge, at the end of the platform.

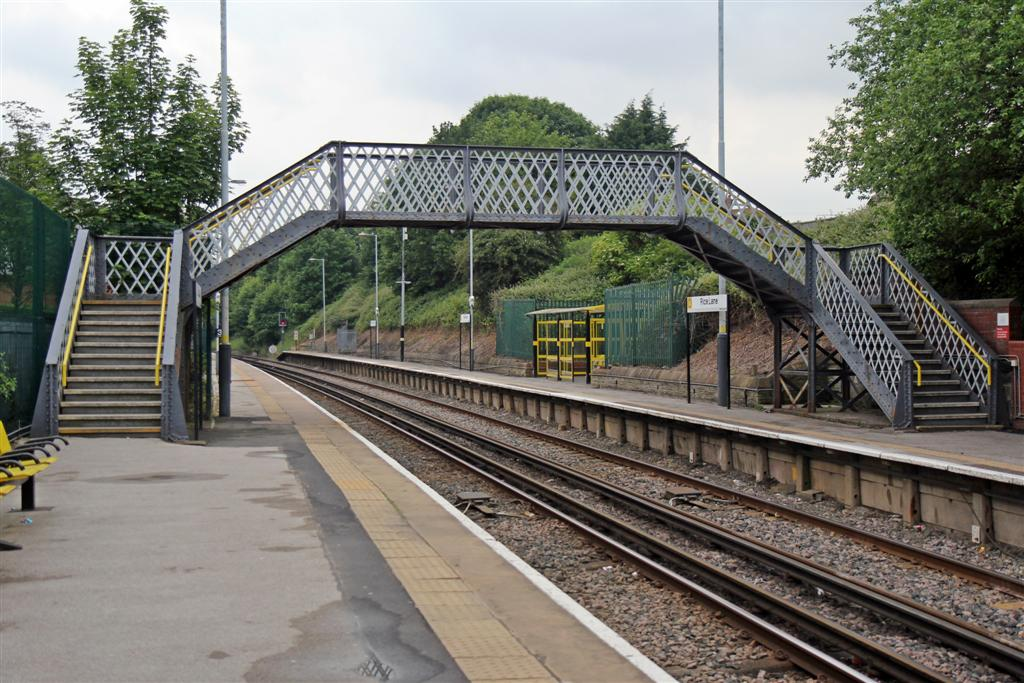
The station footbridge.

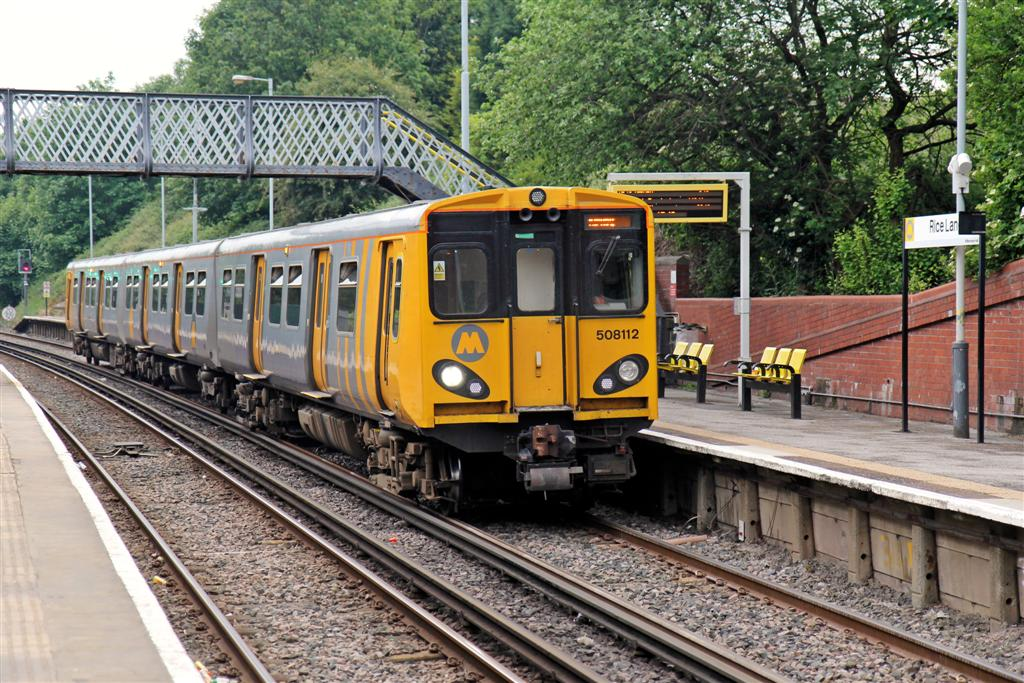
A Merseyrail Class 508 arrives with a service.

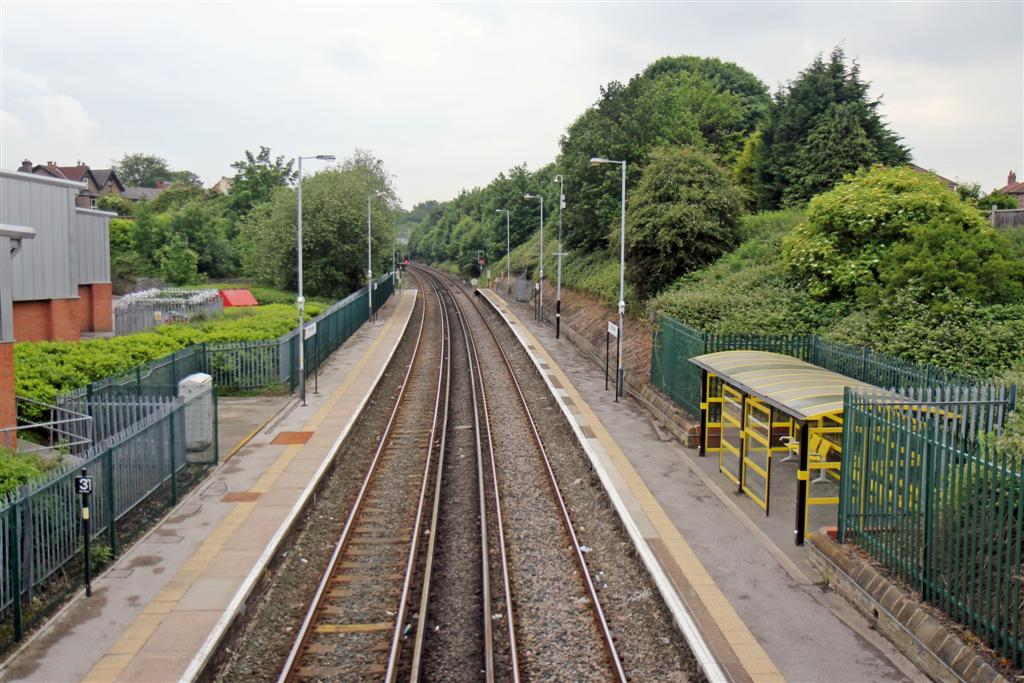
A view from the footbridge.
