= St John the Evangelist's Church, Kirkdale =

Coordinates: 53.4335°N 2.9787°W

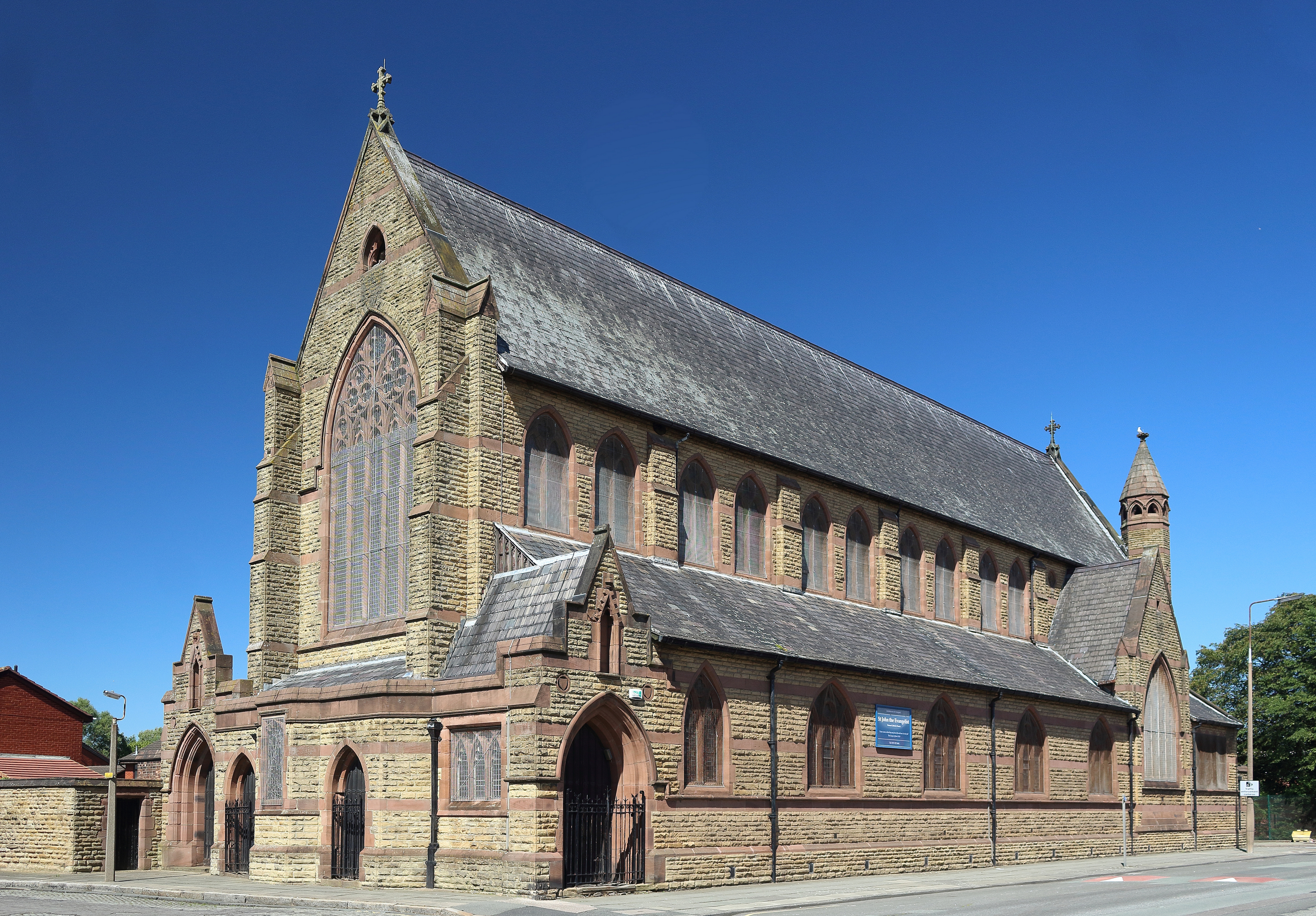
- St John the Evangelist's Church, Kirkdale, from the southwest

- Location in Merseyside
- OS grid reference: SJ 35072 93424
- Location: Fountains Road, Kirkdale, Liverpool, Merseyside
- Country: England
- Denomination: Roman Catholic
- Website: St John, Kirkdale

History
- Status: Parish church

Architecture
- Functional status: Active
- Heritage designation: Grade II
- Designated: 19 June 1985
- Architect(s): J. and B. Sinnott
- Architectural type: Church
- Style: Gothic Revival
- Completed: 1885

Specifications
- Materials: Stone, slate roof

Administration
- Diocese: Archdiocese of Liverpool

Clergy
- Priest: Revd Roy Cooper (since September 1st 2016)

St John the Evangelist's Church is in Fountains Road, Kirkdale, Liverpool, Merseyside, England. It is an active Roman Catholic parish church in Pastoral Area of Liverpool North, in the Archdiocese of Liverpool. The church is recorded in the National Heritage List for England as a designated Grade II listed building. (Note: This grade is the lowest of the three gradings given to listed buildings and is applied to "buildings of national importance and special interest".)

== History ==
The church was built in 1885, and designed by J. and B. Sinnott. The north chapel was added in 1927.

== Architecture ==
=== Exterior ===
St John's is constructed in rock-faced stone, with ashlar bands and dressings, under a slate roof. It consists of a nave and chancel with no structural division, north and south aisles under lean-to roofs, a clerestory, north and south transepts, north and south chapels, a canted baptistry at the west end, and a southwest porch. At the southeast corner is a turret with a belfry, and an octagonal pyramidal roof. The west window of the nave has a five-light window with Geometrical tracery. Along the sides of the aisles are three-light windows, and along the clerestory are two-light windows, all of which are paired between buttresses. The south transept has a five-light window, and the north transept forms the organ loft. The east window has seven lights, and each chapel has a rose window. The porch has a pointed arch and a shaped gable.

=== Interior ===
Inside the church is a west gallery. The nave has a waggon roof, and four-bay arcades carried on round columns. The chancel arcade has two bays with clustered columns. The reredos is in wrought iron. The altar, dated 1898, was designed by Pugin & Pugin.

== See also ==
- Grade II listed buildings in Liverpool-L4

== References and notes ==
Notes

Citations
