= Orrell Park railway station =

Railway station on the Ormskirk Branch of the Northern Line in Liverpool, England

Orrell Park
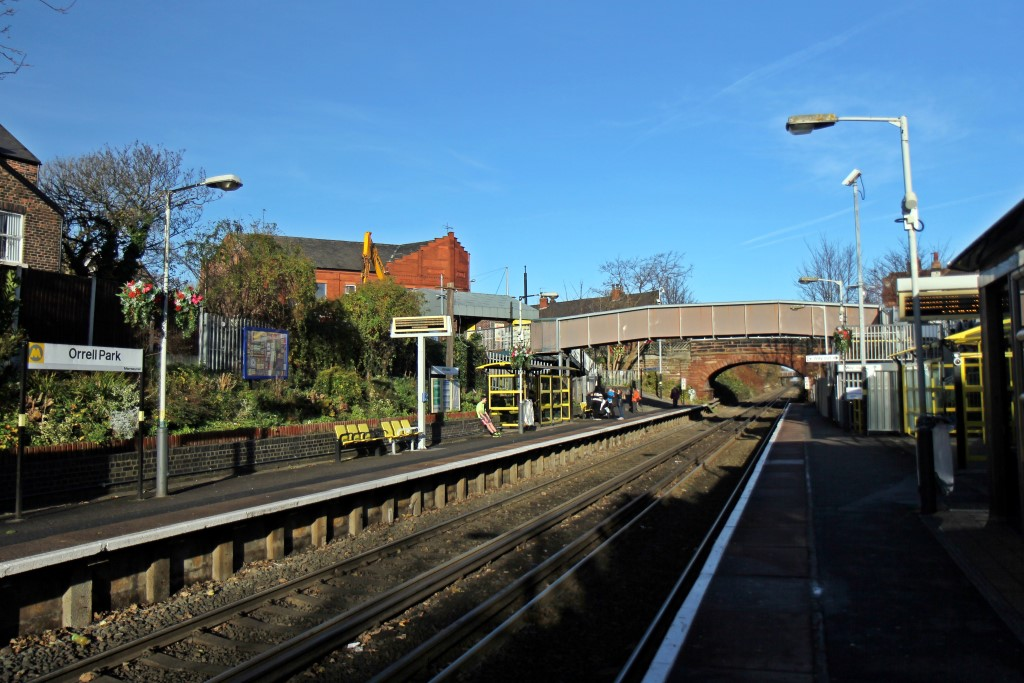

General information
- Location: Orrell Park, Liverpool; England
- Coordinates: 53.4620°N 2.9628°W
- Grid reference: SJ361965
- Manager: Merseyrail
- Transit authority: Merseytravel
- Platforms: 2

Other information
- Station code: OPK
- Fare zone: C1
- Classification: DfT category E

History
- Original company: Lancashire and Yorkshire Railway
- Pre-grouping: Lancashire and Yorkshire Railway
- Post-grouping: London, Midland and Scottish Railway

Key dates
- 19 November 1906: Opened as Orrell Park Halt
- after 1948: Renamed Orrell Park

Passengers
- 2021/22: ▲0.813 million
- 2022/23: ▲1.053 million
- 2023/24: ▲1.176 million
- 2024/25: ▼0.976 million
- 2025/26: ▲1.227 million
Location
Notes
- Passenger statistics from the Office of Rail and Road

Orrell Park railway station is a railway station in Orrell Park, Liverpool, England. The station was opened in 1906 by the Lancashire and Yorkshire Railway, and was originally named Orrell Park Halt; this was simplified to Orrell Park by British Rail. It is located to the north of the city centre. It also serves the nearby district of Orrell. It is on the Ormskirk branch of the Merseyrail network's Northern Line.

Orrell Park is the most convenient station for the Walton Vale shopping area.

== Facilities ==
As with most Merseyrail stations, it has a ticket office that is fully staffed from start of service until after the last train has left (closing shortly after midnight). There is also a ticket machine available. There is a refreshment vending machine provided and waiting shelters on each platform, with train running information provided by automated announcements and digital display screens. The ramps to the platform and the footbridge both have steps, but there is a lift available for disabled passengers.

== Services ==
Trains operate every 15 minutes (Monday to Saturday daytime) between Ormskirk and Liverpool Central, and every 30 minutes at other times.

== Gallery ==
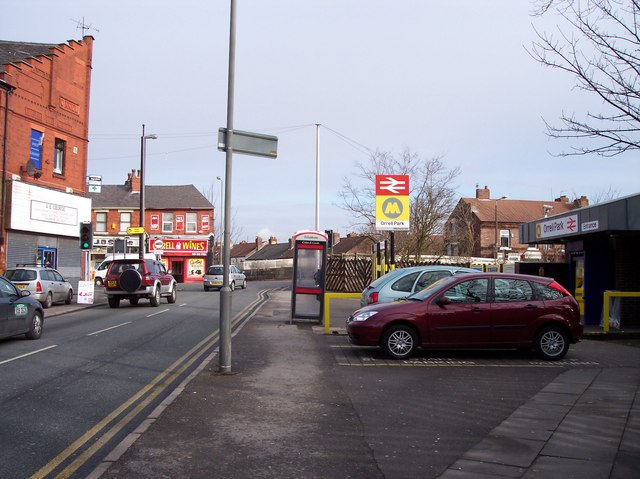
The station viewed from the street.

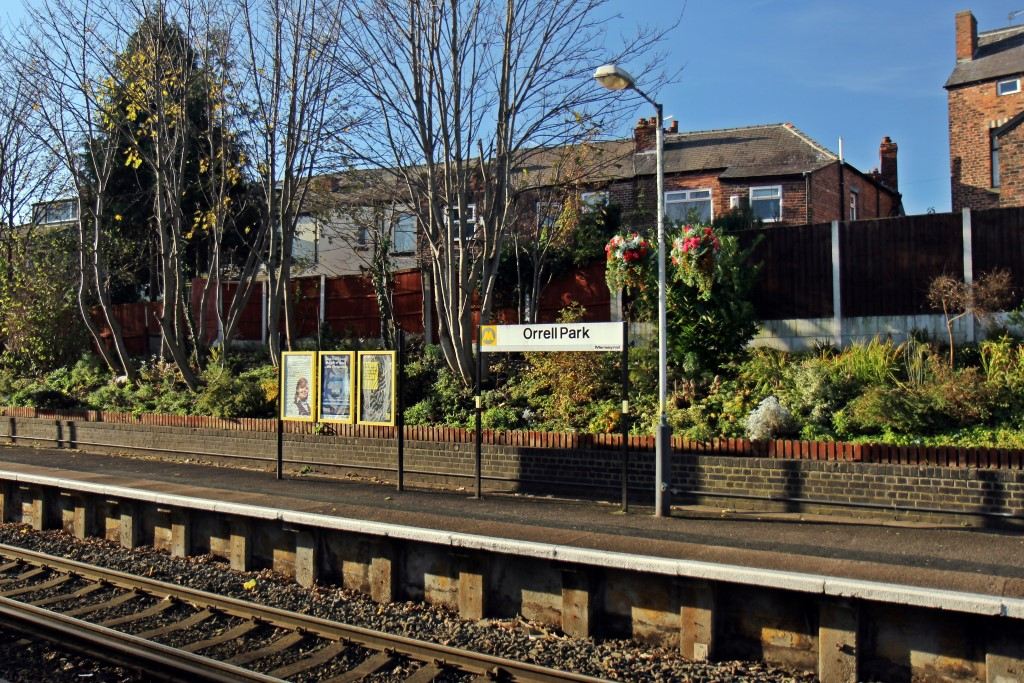
The northbound platform.

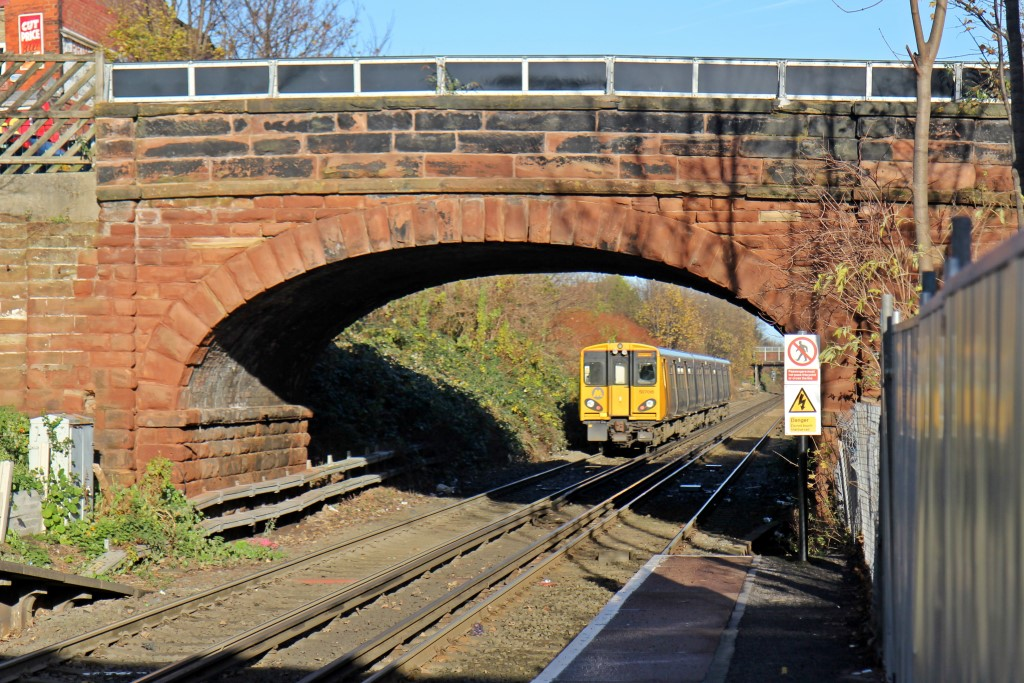
A Merseyrail Class 507 departs with a service to Ormskirk.

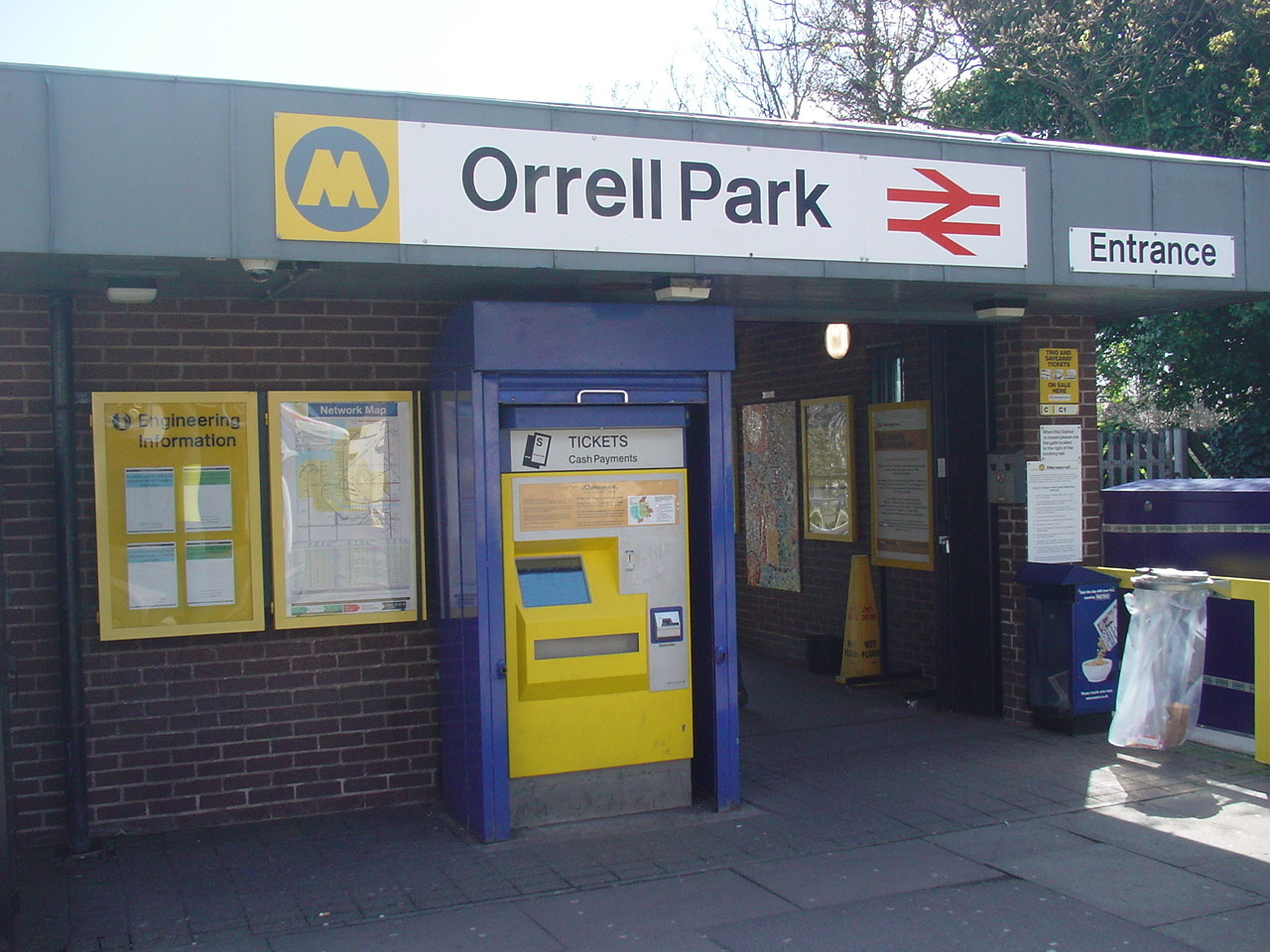
The entrance to the station.

| Preceding station | National Rail | Following station |
|---|---|---|
| Aintree towards Ormskirk | Merseyrail; Northern Line | Walton towards Liverpool Central |
