= Orrell Park =

District of Liverpool, England

Coordinates: 53.450°N 2.9585°W

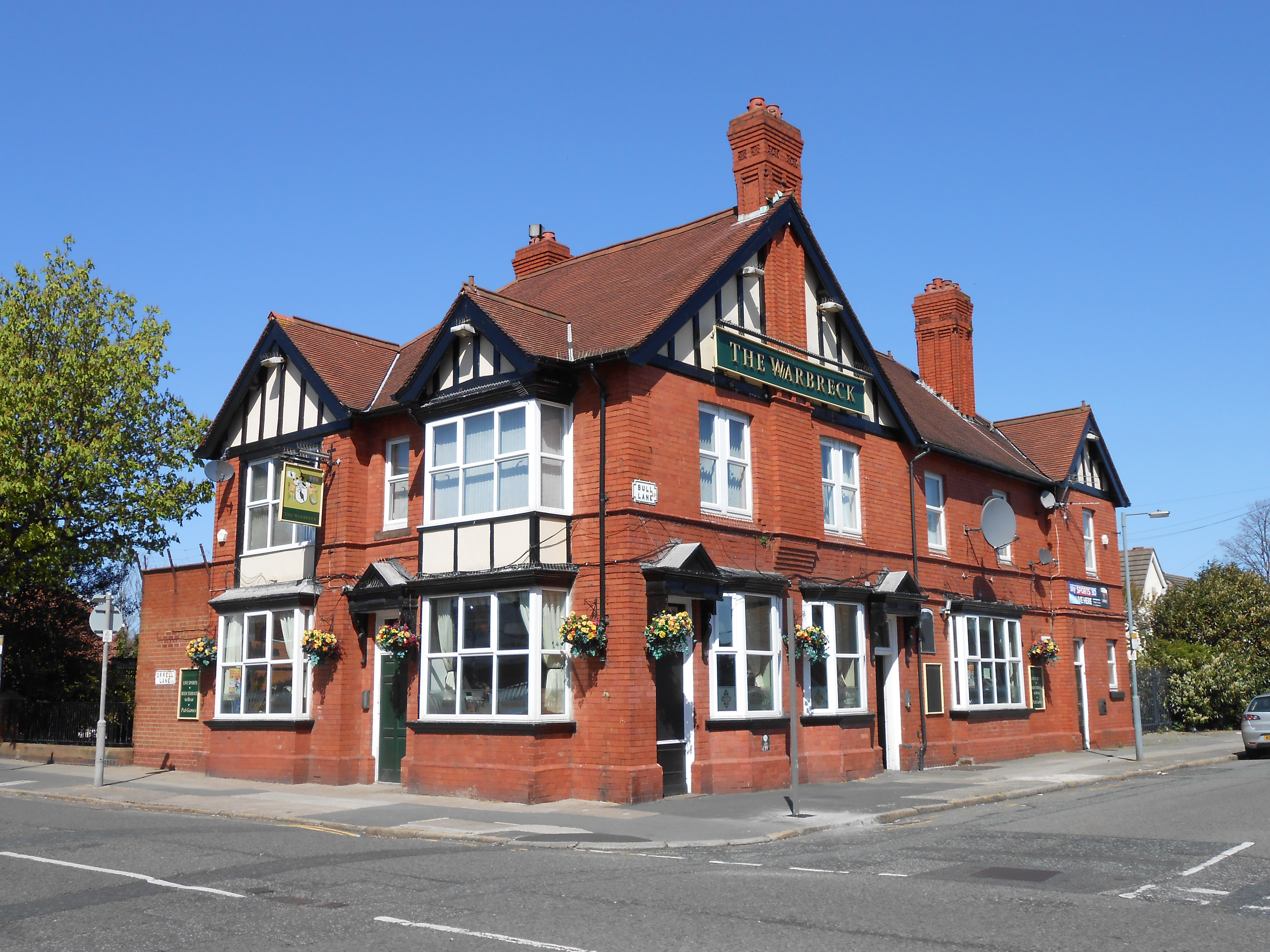
- The Warbreck public house, Orrell Park

- Location within Merseyside
- OS grid reference: SJ3602896740
- Metropolitan borough: Liverpool
- Metropolitan county: Merseyside
- Region: North West
- Country: England
- Sovereign state: United Kingdom
- Post town: LIVERPOOL
- Postcode district: L9
- Dialling code: 0151
- Police: Merseyside
- Fire: Merseyside
- Ambulance: North West
- UK Parliament: Liverpool Walton

Orrell Park is a district of Liverpool, Merseyside, England. It is a small residential area of northern Liverpool between the larger neighbouring districts of Aintree and Walton-on-the-Hill. It is part of the Liverpool Walton Parliamentary constituency. The area is built upon a raised hillock.

== History ==
The area is predominantly Victorian in character and architecture, being built mainly for workers and managers of the Bootle docks during rapid expansion from 1850 onwards with the Industrial Revolution and growth of maritime trade from the British Empire. There is also some Edwardian housing as well as pockets of post-war housing built after the area suffered bomb damage during World War II. Prior to industrialisation, the area - part of the Earl of Sefton's estate - was mainly pasture land and orchards.

A number of roads in the area are named after historical British figures at the time they were built such as Victoria Drive (Queen-Empress Victoria), Albert Drive (Prince Albert), Alexandra Drive (Queen-Empress Alexandra), Kitchener Drive (The Earl Kitchener), Montgomery Road (Viscount Montgomery of Alamein) and Redvers Drive (General Sir Redvers Buller).

== Transport and local amenities ==
The area's main link to Liverpool City Centre is Orrell Park railway station which was built in 1906 and today is part of the Merseyrail metro system. Trains run from early morning every 15 minutes until the late evening, after which a 30 minute service runs until midnight. A number of bus routes run directly to the city centre from nearby Walton Vale which is around a 10-minute walk from the Orrell Park area.

A popular nightclub and concert venue, The Orrell Park Bar (formerly a ballroom built in 1927 and still known locally as the "OPB"), is located in the district. Rory Storm and the Hurricanes, Ringo Starr, and Jerry Lee Lewis have performed there. Orrell Park is also home to Devonfield Gardens, a Green Flag Award winner, and the smallest of such in England, which regularly hosts community events.

Orrell Park Community Centre is over 40 years old, and has a wide range of activities, classes and free events. It is situated opposite Orrell Park train station and has its own car park for visitors.

The Orrell Park Hotel is a 12-bedroomed, family-run hotel, on Orrell Lane. The hotel was previously two large Edwardian residential houses which were converted into a hotel in 1962. The Hotel was re-opened in 2013 following refurbishment and in 2024 opened a restaurant called Sarus which serves a variety of tapas dishes.

Other local amenities include The Cuckoo Pub and The Windsor Pub. There is also a local ASDA supermarket located on Orrell Lane with a variety of small local shops, restaurants and bars located along both Orrell Lane and Moss Lane which are the two central thoroughfares of the area.
