= Spellow Lane Church, Walton =

Church in Liverpool, England

Spellow Lane Church
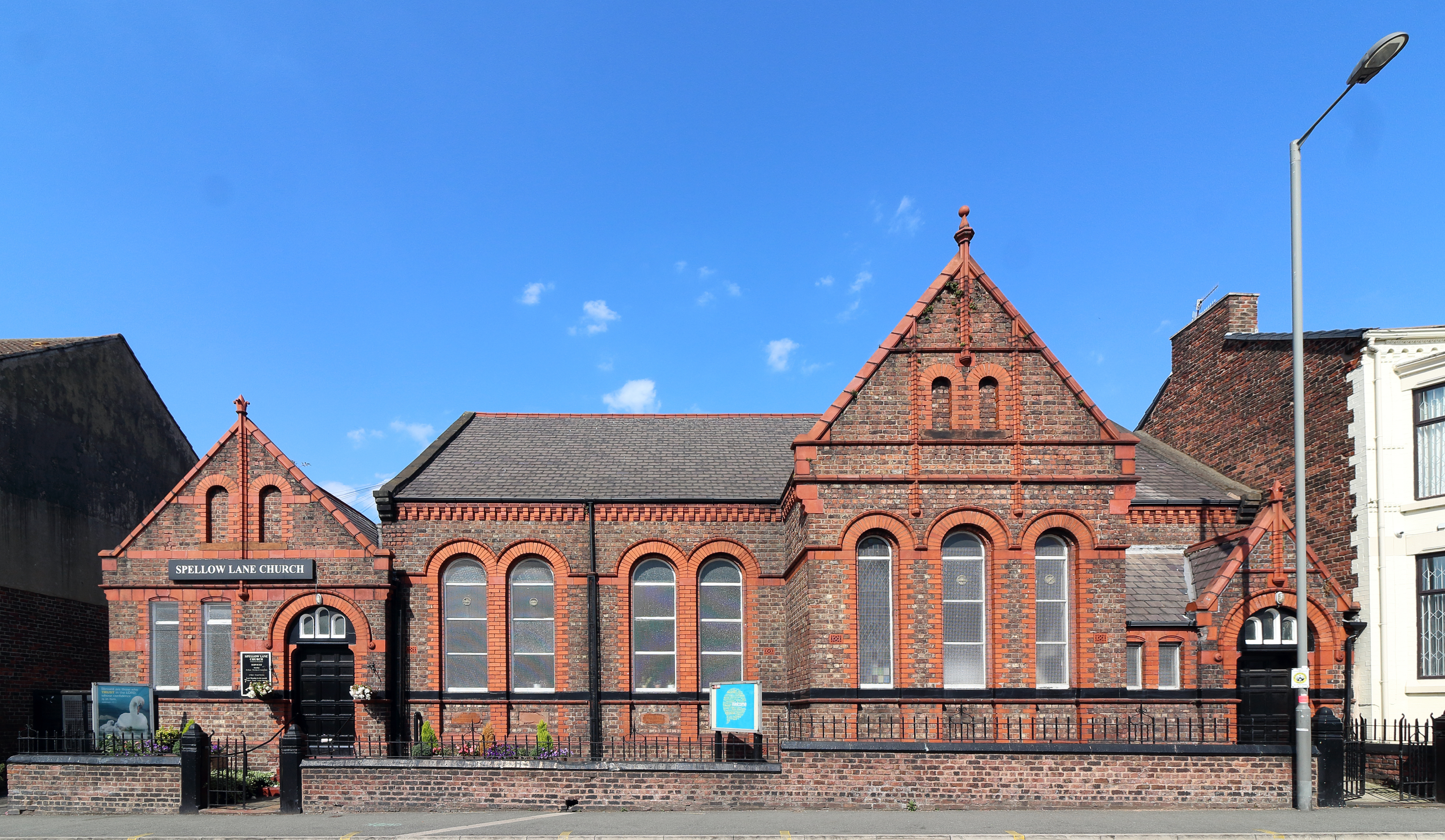

- Position in Merseyside

Religion
- Affiliation: Evangelical
- Ecclesiastical or organizational status: Parish Church

Location
- Location: 62 Spellow Lane, Walton, Liverpool, L4 4DF
- Interactive map of Spellow Lane Church
- Coordinates: 53.437627°N 2.968135°W

Architecture
- Completed: 1908

Website
- www.spellowlanechurch.org

Spellow Lane Church is an Evangelical church in Walton, Liverpool, Merseyside, England (grid reference SJ357938).
