= Walton railway station (Merseyside) =

Railway station on the Ormskirk Branch of the Northern Line in Liverpool, England

Walton (Merseyside)
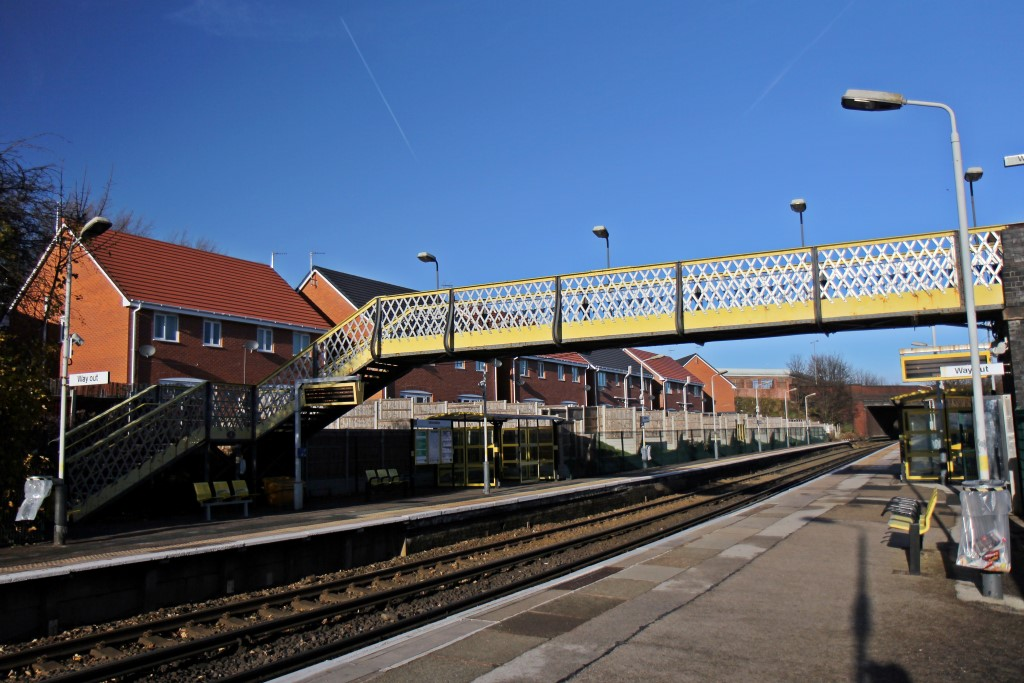
- Walton railway station, 2013

General information
- Location: Walton, Liverpool; England
- Coordinates: 53.4562°N 2.9661°W
- Grid reference: SJ359959
- Manager: Merseyrail
- Transit authority: Merseytravel
- Platforms: 2

Other information
- Station code: WAO
- Fare zone: C1
- Classification: DfT category E

History
- Original company: Liverpool, Ormskirk and Preston Railway
- Pre-grouping: Lancashire and Yorkshire Railway
- Post-grouping: London, Midland and Scottish Railway

Key dates
- 2 April 1849: Opened as Walton Junction
- ?: Renamed Walton (Merseyside)

Passengers
- 2021/22: ▲0.334 million
- 2022/23: ▲0.418 million
- 2023/24: ▲0.476 million
- 2024/25: ▼0.370 million
- 2025/26: ▲0.412 million
Location
Notes
- Passenger statistics from the Office of Rail and Road

Walton railway station is a railway station in Walton, Liverpool, England, located to the north of the city centre. It is on the Ormskirk branch of the Merseyrail network's Northern Line.

== History ==
Originally named Walton Junction when opened by the Liverpool, Ormskirk and Preston Railway on 2 April 1849, the station was renamed Walton (Merseyside) by British Rail. It is located just to the north of the junction between the Ormskirk and Kirkby branches of the Northern Line.

== Facilities ==
The station ticket office is staffed throughout the hours of service each day, closing shortly after midnight. At platform level, there are shelters on each side, information screens and timetable notice boards. Automated announcements are also used to convey train running information. Step-free access is only possible from the car park to the southbound platform, as access to the ticket office and via the footbridge to the northbound platform require the use of stairs. There is car parking for 10 vehicles and secure storage for 10 cycles. During November 2018 the height, width and layout of the platforms were adjusted to prepare for Merseyrail's new fleet of trains which are due to be introduced from 2020.

== Services ==
Trains operate every 15 minutes (Monday to Saturday daytime) between Ormskirk and Liverpool Central, and every 30 minutes at other times (evenings and all day Sunday).

== Gallery ==
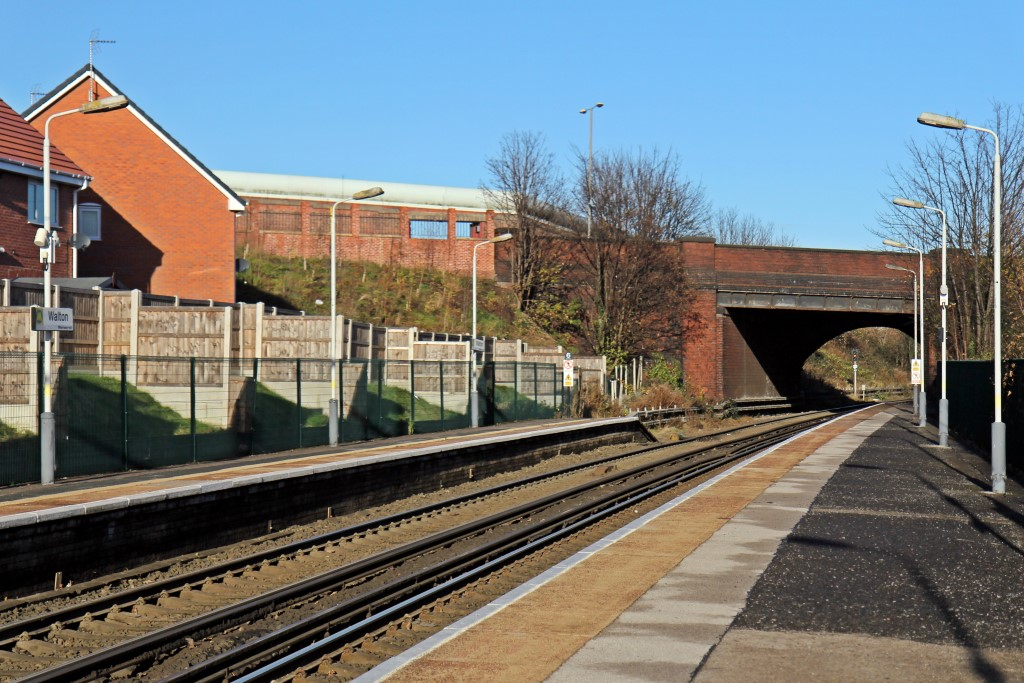
The northern end of the station.

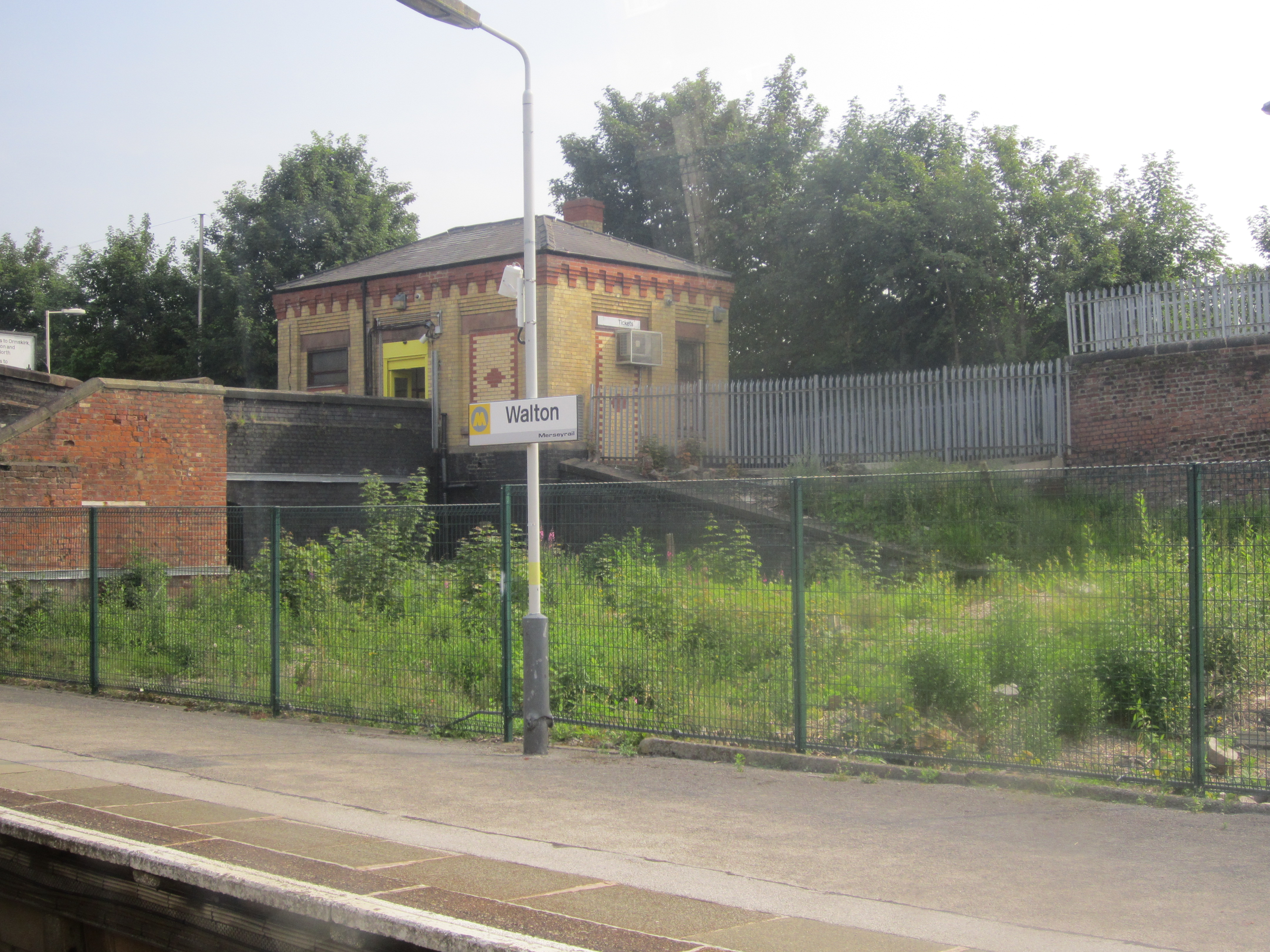
The station building.

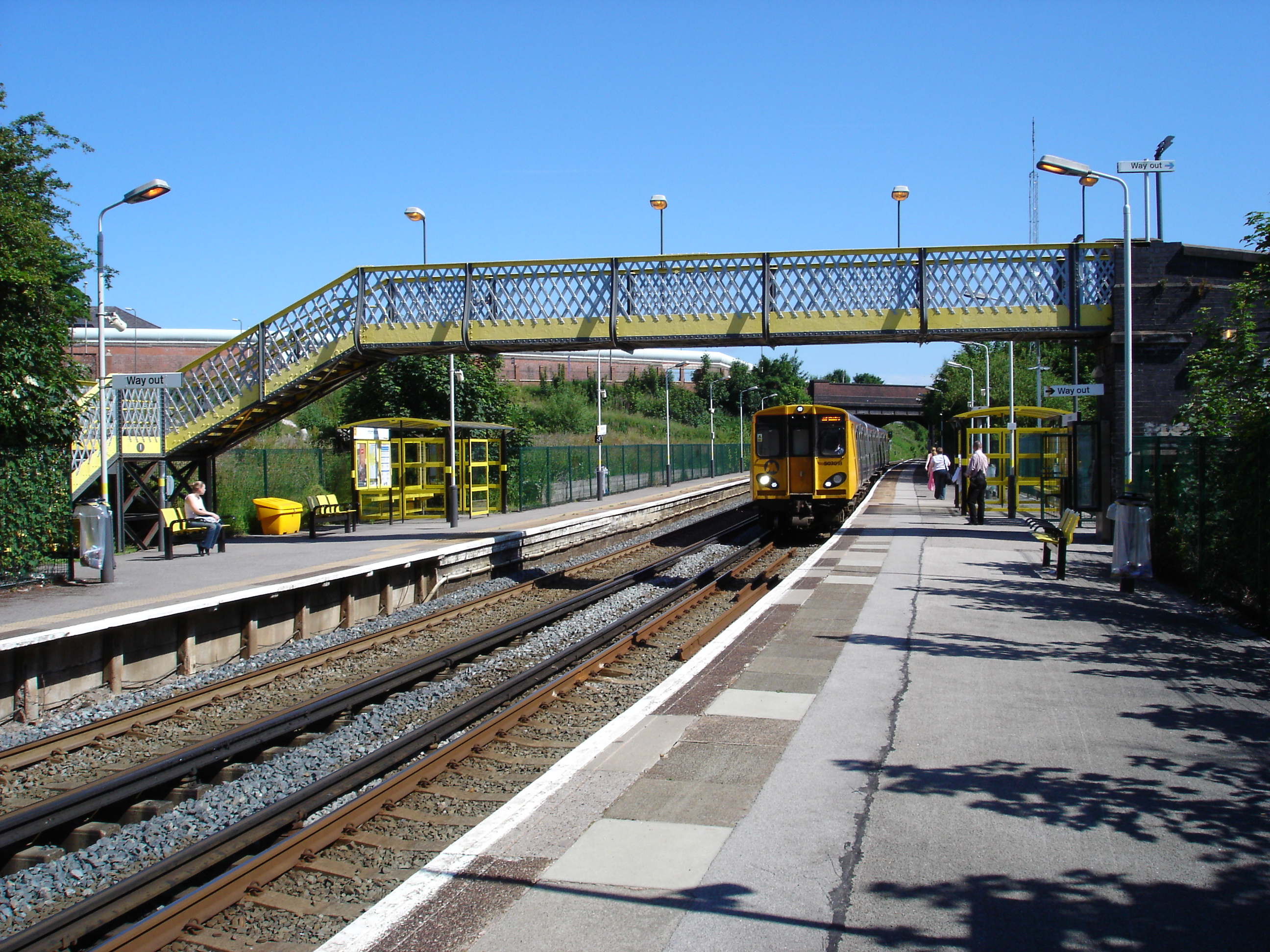
An overall view of the station.

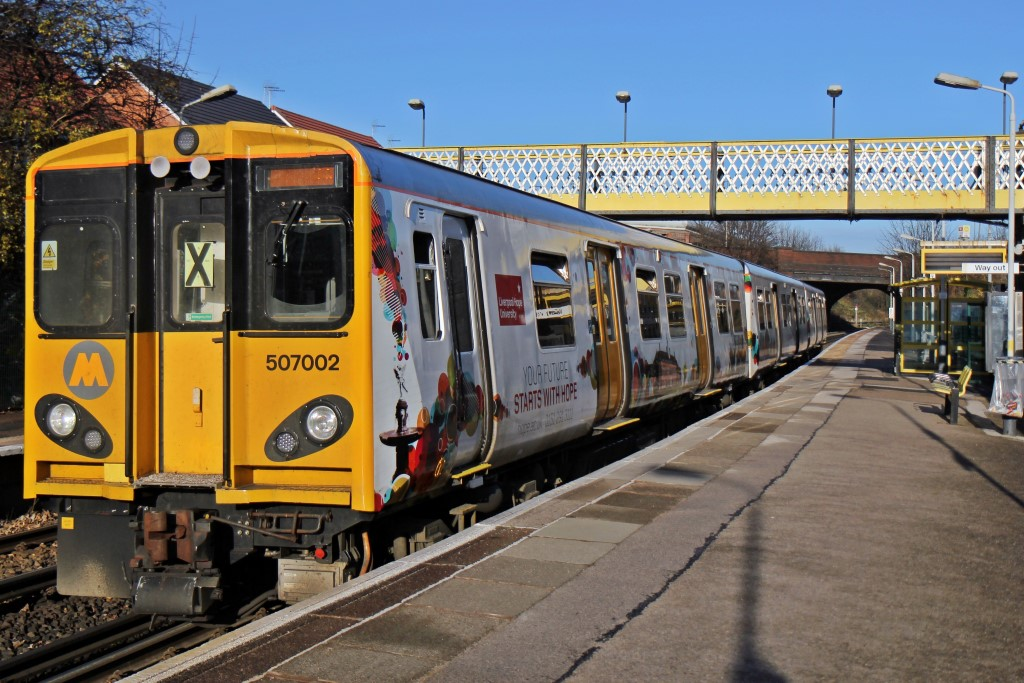
A Merseyrail Class 507 arrives with a service to Liverpool.

Preceding station	National Rail	Following station
Orrell Park towards Ormskirk	Merseyrail; Northern Line	Kirkdale towards Liverpool Central
