= Kirkdale, Liverpool =

District of Liverpool, England

Coordinates: 53.4273°N 2.9986°W

Kirkdale
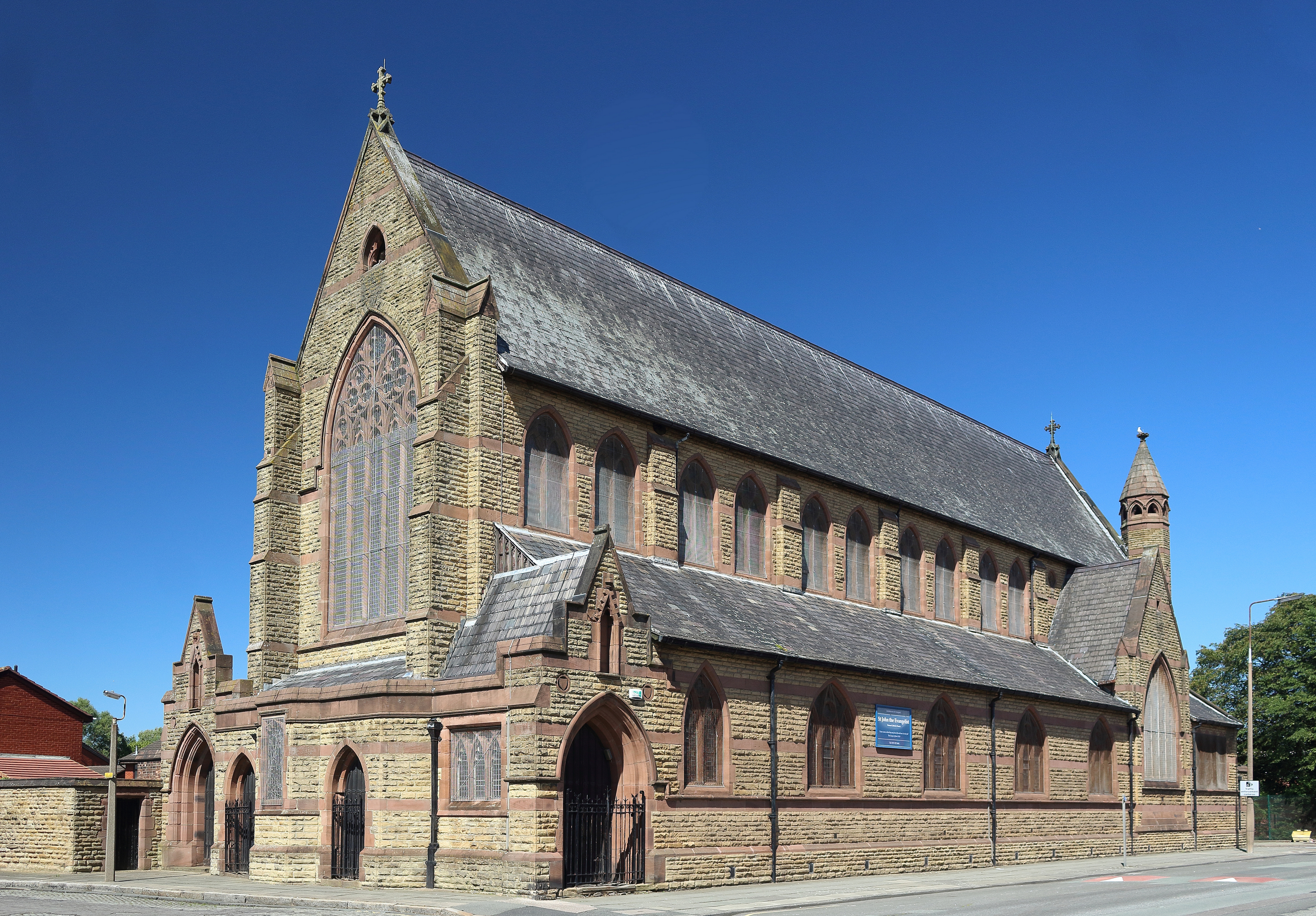
- St. John the Evangelist Church, Fountains Road, Kirkdale

- Location within Merseyside
- Population: 16,115 (2011 Census)
- OS grid reference: SJ337927
- Metropolitan borough: Liverpool
- Metropolitan county: Merseyside
- Region: North West
- Country: England
- Sovereign state: United Kingdom
- Post town: LIVERPOOL
- Postcode district: L4, L5, L20
- Dialling code: 0151
- Police: Merseyside
- Fire: Merseyside
- Ambulance: North West
- UK Parliament: Liverpool Riverside

Kirkdale is a district of Liverpool, Merseyside, England, and a Liverpool City Council ward that covers both Kirkdale and Vauxhall. At the 2011 Census, the population was 16,115. Kirkdale is bordered by Bootle to the north, Walton and Everton to the east and Vauxhall to the south.

== History ==
Kirkdale is a working class area with mainly Victorian terraced houses. From 1885 to 1983, it was part of the Liverpool Kirkdale constituency.

Boundary Street was an ancient division between the township of Kirkdale and Liverpool before Liverpool's expansion took in Kirkdale in the 1860s. It thus separates Kirkdale and Vauxhall.

Kirkdale was formerly a township and chapelry in the parish of Walton-on-the-Hill, in 1866 Kirkdale became a separate civil parish, on 1 April 1922 the parish was abolished and merged with Liverpool. In 1921, the parish had a population of 69,857.

Kirkdale is now undergoing a large amount of regeneration. The old Easby estate has been demolished to make way for new two-, three- and four-bedroom properties. They have been built for both local residents and incomers.

== Transport ==
There are three railway stations in the district, owing to its size and location near where the Merseyrail Northern Line branches diverge. The stations are: Bank Hall, near the boundary with Bootle on the branch to Southport; Kirkdale station itself, serving the main housing area and Sandhills, a busy station acting as the Northern Line junction station.

== Places of worship ==
St. Lawrence with St. Paul's, Kirkdale is the Church of England parish church. The parish boundary runs from the edge of Bootle to the north down until the edge of the Vauxhall area and to the edge of Walton in the east. St. Lawrence church joined with St. Paul's in 2002 when the parish of St. Paul with St. Mary's, Bootle, was split in two and brought into the Liverpool North Deanery, in Liverpool Diocese.

The large Catholic community is served by the Parish of St John and St John the Evangelist's Church, a Grade II listed building. The affiliated primary school is located across Sessions Road.

== Kirkdale Cemetery ==
Kirkdale has a large cemetery containing 386 Commonwealth War Graves from the First World War and 115 from the Second World War. Over 100 of these graves from the former war are of Canadian servicemen who died at No 5 Canadian Hospital established at Kirkdale in July 1917. There are two War Graves plots (mostly of First World War dead) with the names of those buried in them listed on Screen Wall memorials. There were formerly large numbers of graves of German and American war dead from the First World War and Belgians from both world wars but these were nearly all removed to dedicated national cemeteries within the United Kingdom or repatriated to their home countries. There are also buried some of the victims of the Liverpool Blitz including Francis William Beaumont, son of the Dame of Sark, and his actress wife Mary Lawson.

== Notable residents ==
- April Ashley, model
- Bessie Braddock, politician
- James Campbell, artist
- William Connolly, soldier, buried at Kirkdale Cemetery
- Anthony Gordon, footballer
- Victor Grayson, politician
- William Halsall, marine painter, born in Kirkdale
- Gerald Hanley, author and screenwriter, brother of James Hanley, was born here in 1916
- James Hanley, novelist and playwright was born in Kirkdale in 1897
- Michael Holliday, singer
- Geoffrey Hughes, actor
- Brian Jacques, author
- Jonjoe Kenny, footballer
- Steve McManaman, footballer
- Paul Reynolds, musician
- Paul Smith, boxer
- Callum Smith, boxer
- Liam Smith, boxer
- Stephen Smith, boxer
