= Walton, Liverpool =

Area of Liverpool, England

Coordinates: 53.443°N 2.955°W

Walton
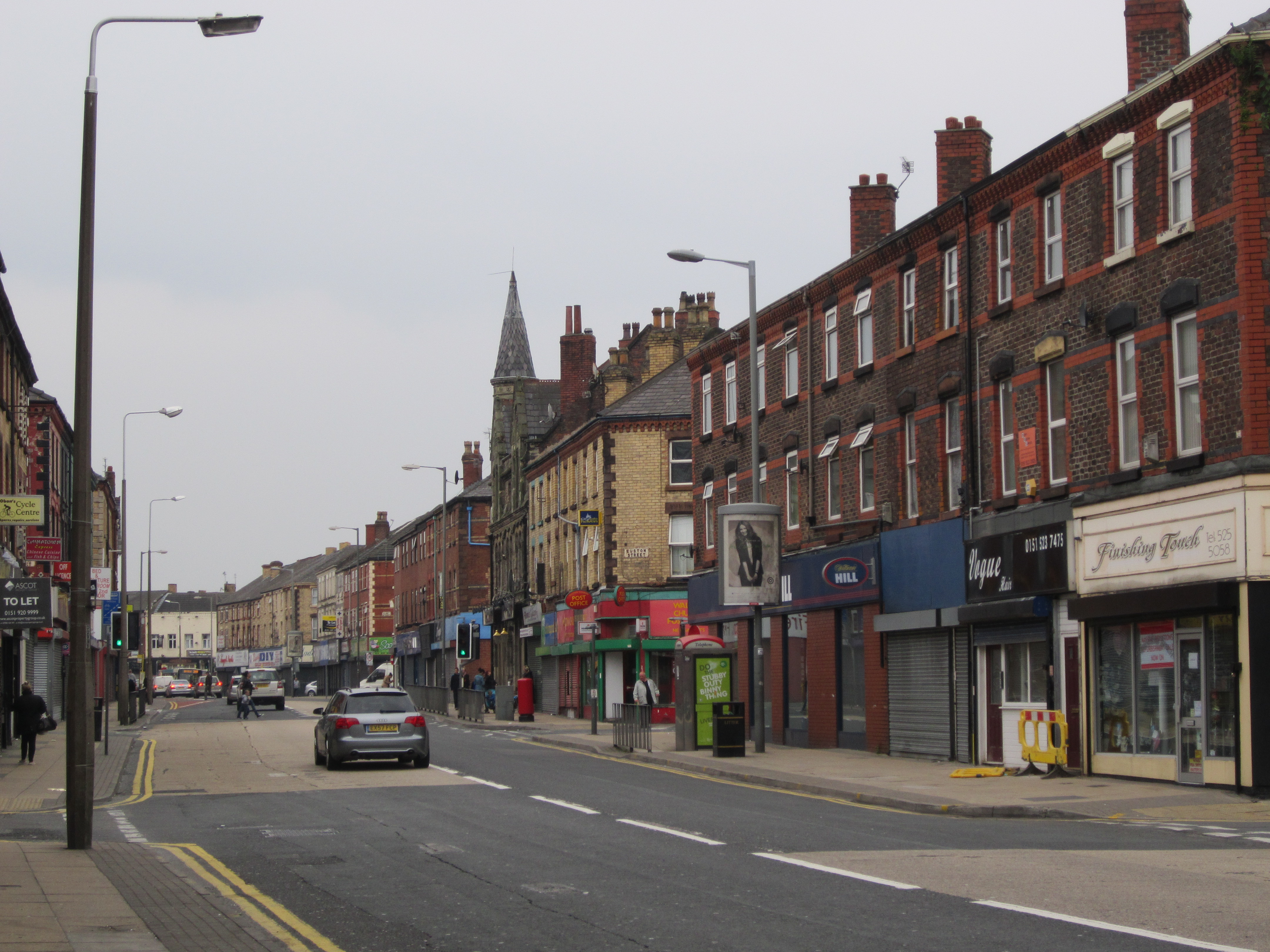
- County Road, Walton

- Location within Merseyside
- OS grid reference: SJ365945
- Metropolitan borough: Liverpool
- Metropolitan county: Merseyside
- Region: North West
- Country: England
- Sovereign state: United Kingdom
- Post town: LIVERPOOL
- Postcode district: L4, L9
- Dialling code: 0151
- Police: Merseyside
- Fire: Merseyside
- Ambulance: North West
- UK Parliament: Liverpool Walton

Walton is an area of Liverpool, in Merseyside, England, north of Anfield and east of Bootle and Orrell Park. Historically in Lancashire, it is largely residential, with a diverse population.

== History ==
The name may derive from the same origin as Wales. The incoming Saxons called the earlier native inhabitants (the Celtic Britons) Walas or Wealas, meaning "foreigner". Another possible etymology is Wald tun, Old English for "Forest Town".

Walton's recorded history starts with the death of Edward the Confessor, when Winestan held the manor of Walton. After the Norman conquest of 1066, Roger of Poitou included Walton in the lands he gave to his sheriff, Godfrey.

In 1200, King John gave Walton to Richard de Meath, who left it to his brother, Henry de Walton. Henry's son William inherited the land, but died before his son Richard was of age, so Richard was made a ward of Nicholas de la Hose by the Earl of Derby and the estate was managed by nobles outside the family for a time.

Walton was then held by the de Walton family until Roger de Walton's death in the 15th century, when it was split through marriage between the Crosse, Chorley and Fazakerley families. Walton Manor later passed through the Breres and Atherton families until it was sold in 1804 to Liverpool banker Thomas Leyland. Some of the Walton land also passed to the Earl of Derby and the Sefton family.

From 1894 to 1895 Walton on the Hill was an urban district, Walton then became part of Liverpool Borough Council. In 1921, the civil parish named Walton on the Hill had a population of 83,290. On 1 April 1922, the parish was abolished and merged with Liverpool. Hartley's Village was built in the 19th century to house workers from the Hartley's Jam Factory.

=== 20th century ===
Moulded plastics company Dunlop had its UK head office and wellington boot manufacturing plant on what is now the Cavendish Retail Park (off Rice Lane and opposite the former Walton Hospital) until the mid-1990s. In September 1980, a fire at the plant closed Rice Lane and residents were told to stay indoors due to hazardous atmospheric pollution. The fire caused so much damage that the plant had to be demolished, and only part of the site remained until its closure. The building used as the main headquarters was left abandoned for many years until a Chinese restaurant was opened in the late 1990s on the site. The last remaining plant, on Cavendish Drive, was demolished in 2004 to make way for a housing estate.

=== 21st century ===
On August 3, 2024, Walton was affected by the 2024 United Kingdom riots: 300 people gathered near County Road Mosque and the Spellow Lane Library Hub and a local shop were set on fire.

== Notable buildings ==
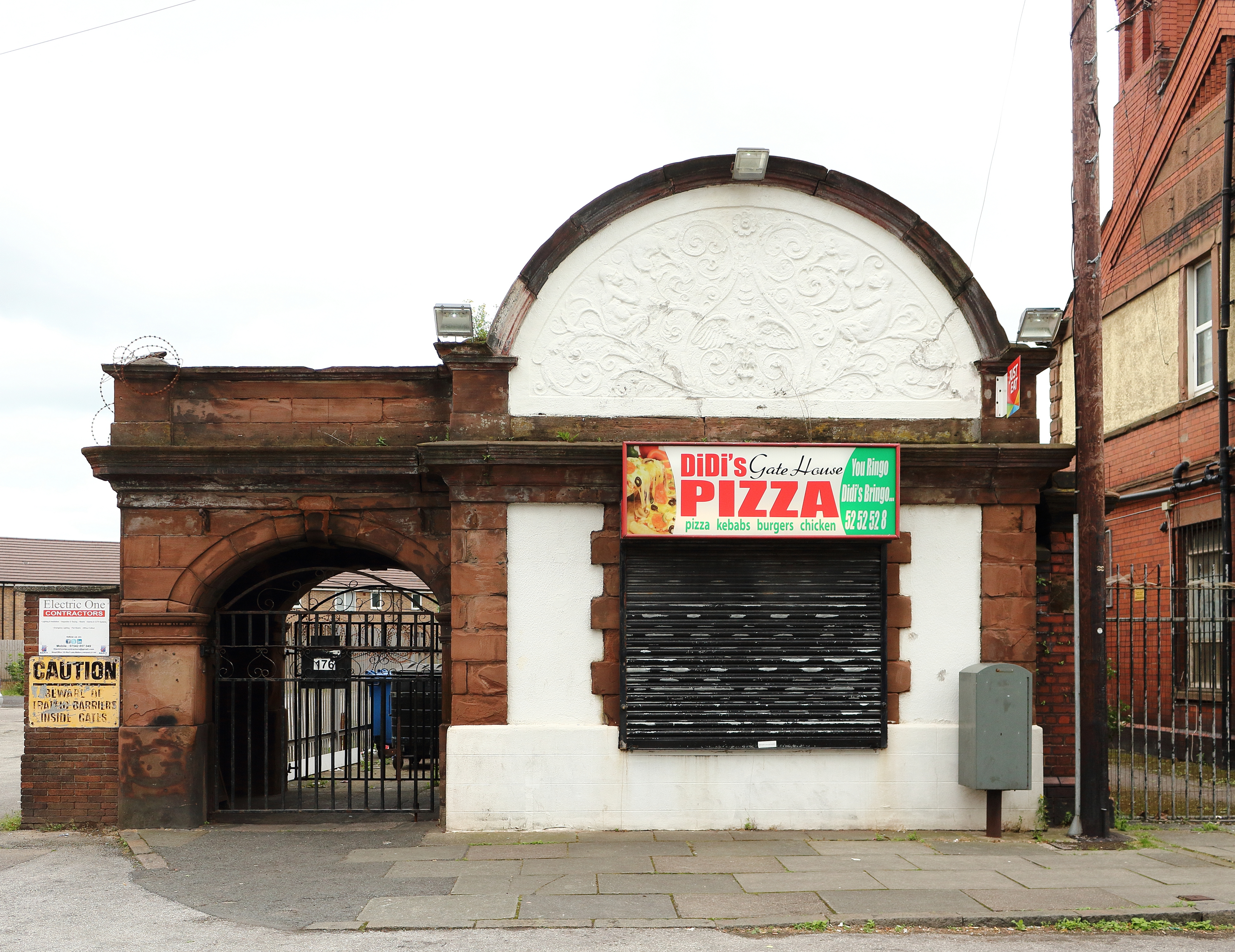
Ticket office for the zoo

In 1884, the Liverpool Inner City Zoological Park and Gardens opened on what is now the Cavendish Retail Park. Its star attraction was "Pongo", a chimpanzee who lived in the Monkey House. The zoo itself was known for its large bronze Liver birds which sat atop of the entrance gates, and its splendid beauty. The gardens closed in the early 1900s and the only surviving remains is the Ticket Booth, which is now a pizza takeaway beside The Plough function rooms (formerly a public house). Rice Lane City Farm is also in Walton, at the end of Rawcliffe Road, occupying the land that once was Liverpool Parochial Cemetery.

The Prince of Wales pub on Rice Lane was nicknamed "The Sod House" by Edward VII, after making a royal visit to the zoo and entering it for refreshments, perhaps because the landlord used clods of earth ("sods") draped over the beer barrels to keep them cool.

The former Shell garage on Rice Lane (now a used car dealership) was once the official workshop of Ferrari for their race team when competing at Aintree Grand Prix course in the 1950s.

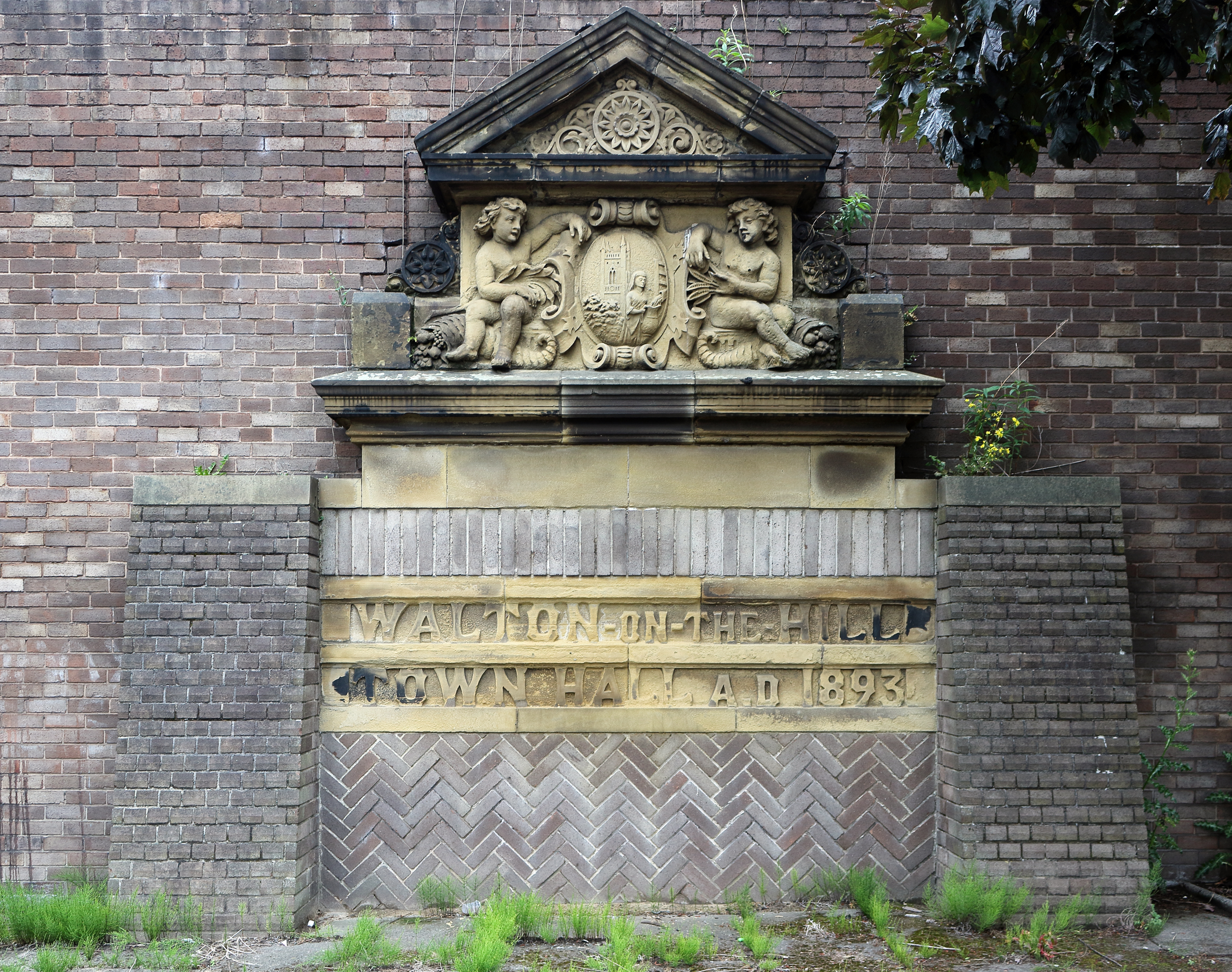
Remains of Town Hall

Walton Town Hall was demolished in the 1960s to make way for the Queens Drive fly-over. The side wall, which includes the name etched in stone, still stands on the northbound side of the A59 at the fly-over. The wall is currently owned by Croppers garage which occupies the space.

Walton was also once the location of Walton Hospital, on Rice Lane. Several famous Liverpudlians, including Paul McCartney and Joe Fagan, were born at the hospital. The hospital was also once a regional centre for neurology and neurosurgery. As demand for services continued to increase the capacity for patients at the relatively small Walton Hospital site decreased and in 1998 all neurosurgical services were transferred to the newly built Walton Centre, on the same site as Aintree University Hospital in Fazakerley.

Walton Hospital started life in the late 19th century as West Derby Union Workhouse and nearby Walton Parochial cemetery contains many tens of thousands of unmarked and uncelebrated "common" graves of the poor who depended on it for sustenance. This cemetery, which now houses the City Farm, also holds the grave of Robert Noonan, also known as Robert Tressell, who fell ill and died in Liverpool while waiting for a ship to emigrate to America. In 2019, Tressell was commemorated with a march to his graveside led by a brass band.

Clock View Hospital is a psychiatric facility standing near the old grounds of the original Walton Hospital. It is a medium level facility consisting of 5 inpatient wards and a neurological unit within the same building (Walton Centre). It was purpose built in 2014 as a state of the art psychiatric care facility and opened to patients in 2015. Since then, it has won many awards for outstanding care and treatment for patients and in 2018 Clock View won a Sustainable Health and Care award (Capital Projects) for its building design efficiency.

Walton is home to Goodison Park football stadium, which was built in 1892 as the first purpose built football stadium in England and the home of Everton Football Club, who have remained there ever since; although little of the original stadium structure now exists. They had previously played at Anfield Stadium on the opposite side of Stanley Park, which then became the home of Liverpool Football Club.

== Governance ==
The Liverpool Walton constituency was long a bastion of the left in the Labour Party with a Marxist influence stretching back to the 1950s. This came to a head when the Walton by-election in 1991 saw the Labour Party candidate, Peter Kilfoyle, defeat Walton Real Labour candidate Lesley Mahmood, a member of the Militant group, in the by-election caused by the death of left-wing MP Eric Heffer.

As of 2017, the Member of Parliament representing Walton is Labour's Dan Carden. The majority of councillors representing Walton are Labour.

== Geography ==
Walton borders a number of other areas, some considered inner-city and some considered outer suburbs, these include Clubmoor, Anfield, Kirkdale, Norris Green, Bootle and Orrell Park.

Walton has seven roads that are locally referred to as the ship roads. These roads are: Mauretania, Lusitania, Saxonia, Ivernia, Sylvania, Woolhope and Haggerston. Five of these roads are named after Cunard ships, Mauretania, Lusitania, Saxonia, Ivernia and Sylvania, a reference to Cunard's former headquarters in Liverpool.

== Transport ==
Walton is connected to Liverpool City Centre via the A59 and the A580 (East Lancashire Road).

There are two railway stations in Walton on the Northern Line of the Merseyrail network. Rice Lane railway station (formerly Preston Road) is on the Kirkby branch and Walton railway station (formerly Walton Junction) is on the Ormskirk branch.

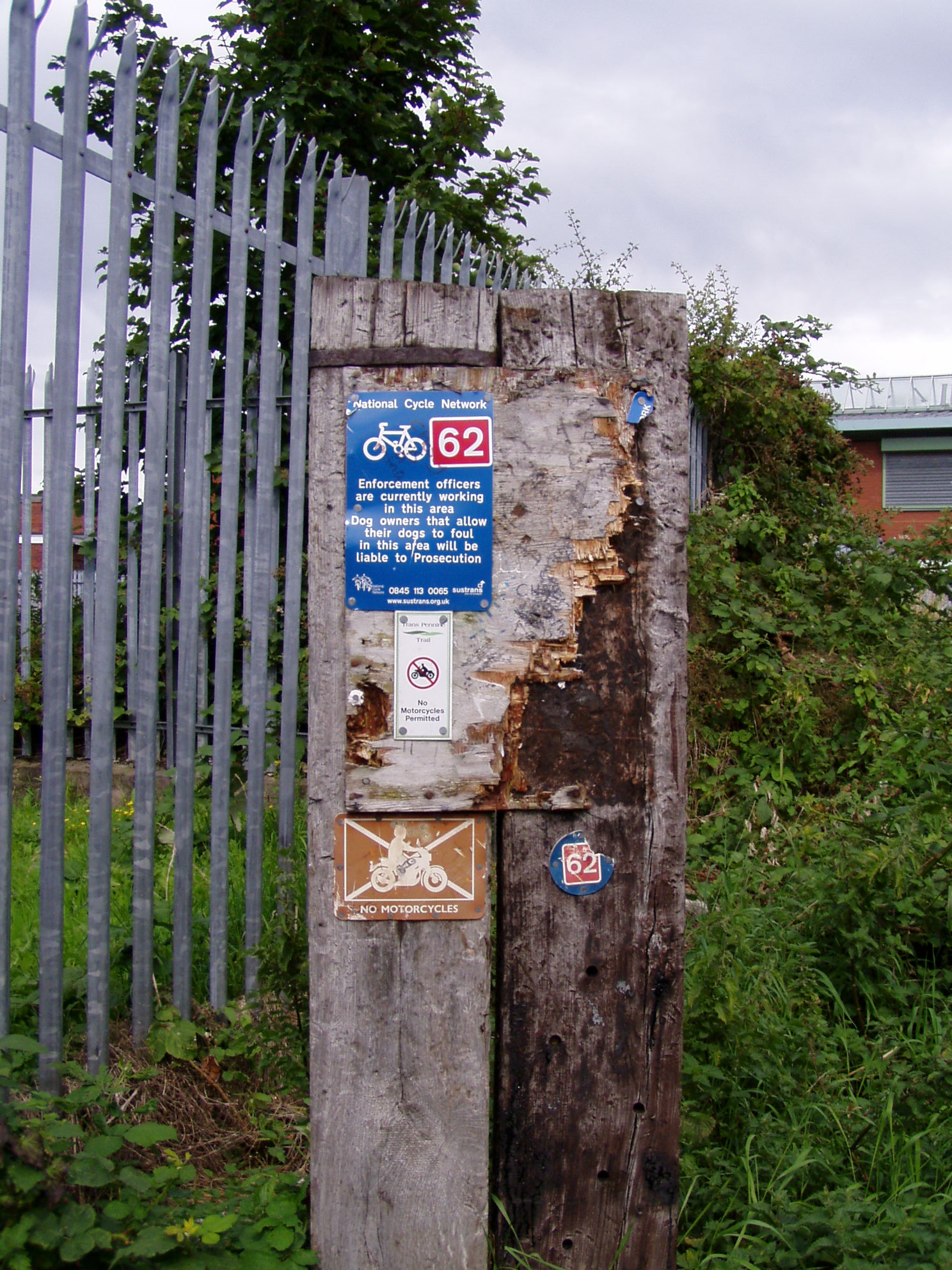
Cycle path sign in Walton

The North Liverpool Extension Line, still in use until the 1970s, included Warbreck railway station in Walton Vale and Spellow railway station, on the Canada Dock Branch near Spellow Lane. Warbreck railway station is no longer in use, and the only remains are on a bicycle path underneath the shops. The path itself is part of the Trans Pennine Trail.

Walton on the Hill railway station was by the Queens Drive flyover, on the Rice Lane side heading southbound. Though the railway station became disused in 1918, the line was used for transporting goods to Liverpool docks via the tunnel which runs through the Walton-Kirkdale area; this leads to Kirkdale railway station and on to Sandhills railway station.

What is now a bike path behind the site of the Hartley's and Jacobs factory used to be Fazakerley Junction, a train depot used until the 1960s.

== Notable people ==
- John Birt, ex-Director-General of the BBC, was born in Walton Hospital.
- Charles Clark (1857–1943), early rugby union international for England who scored the first ever try in an Ireland home international in 1875, born in Walton
- Joe Fagan, Liverpool F.C. manager in the 1980s, was born in Walton Hospital.
- Gérard Houllier, the ex-Liverpool manager, and former manager of Aston Villa in Birmingham, once taught at Alsop Comprehensive.
- Brian Jacques, children's author, of among other titles, The Redwall Series and presenter for Radio City, lived in Walton.
- Paul Jewell, former Wigan Athletic manager, was brought up in the Walton area.
- John Melvin, a guitarist who formed part of the band the Farm, lived in Walton from 1982 until 1998.
- Doris Lloyd, an actress in over 150 films, was born in Walton and died in California in 1968.
- Beatle Paul McCartney was born in Walton Hospital.
- Professor Stephen Molyneux, Educational Technology Guru, lived in Bedford Road and attended Alsop High School in the same class as Jimmy Mulville from 1968 to 1972.
- Jimmy Mulville, former comedian turned television entrepreneur with Hat Trick Productions, came from Walton and attended Alsop High School in the same class as Professor Stephen Molyneux.
- Poet Goronwy Owen was a parish curate and schoolmaster in Walton 1753–55.
- Heidi Range, one third of the Sugababes, born in Walton.
- Sir Ken Robinson, educationalist, was brought up at 45 Spellow Lane, Walton and attended Spellow Lane Church.
- Neil Robinson, Footballer Everton, was born and brought up at 45 Spellow Lane, Walton, making him player born closest to the ground, and attended Gwladys Street School in Walton.
- Alexei Sayle, comedian, attended Alsop High School.
- Claire Sweeney, TV presenter and former Brookside actress, was brought up on Carisbrooke Road in Walton.
- Ricky Tomlinson, actor. Lived off Queens Drive in Walton during the late 1990s.
- Robert Noonan who wrote The Ragged Trousered Philanthropists as Robert Tressell, is buried in Walton Cemetery. He was in Liverpool intending to migrate to America, but died before he could leave.
- Henry Tingle Wilde, merchant sailor and naval officer, chief officer of RMS Titanic; died in the sinking.

== See also ==
- Liverpool (HM Prison)
- Goodison Park
- Arnot St Mary Church of England Primary School
- Liverpool City Council
- Liverpool City Council elections 1880–present
- Liverpool Town Council elections 1835 - 1879
