= Arnot St Mary Church of England Primary School =

Primary school located in Walton, Liverpool

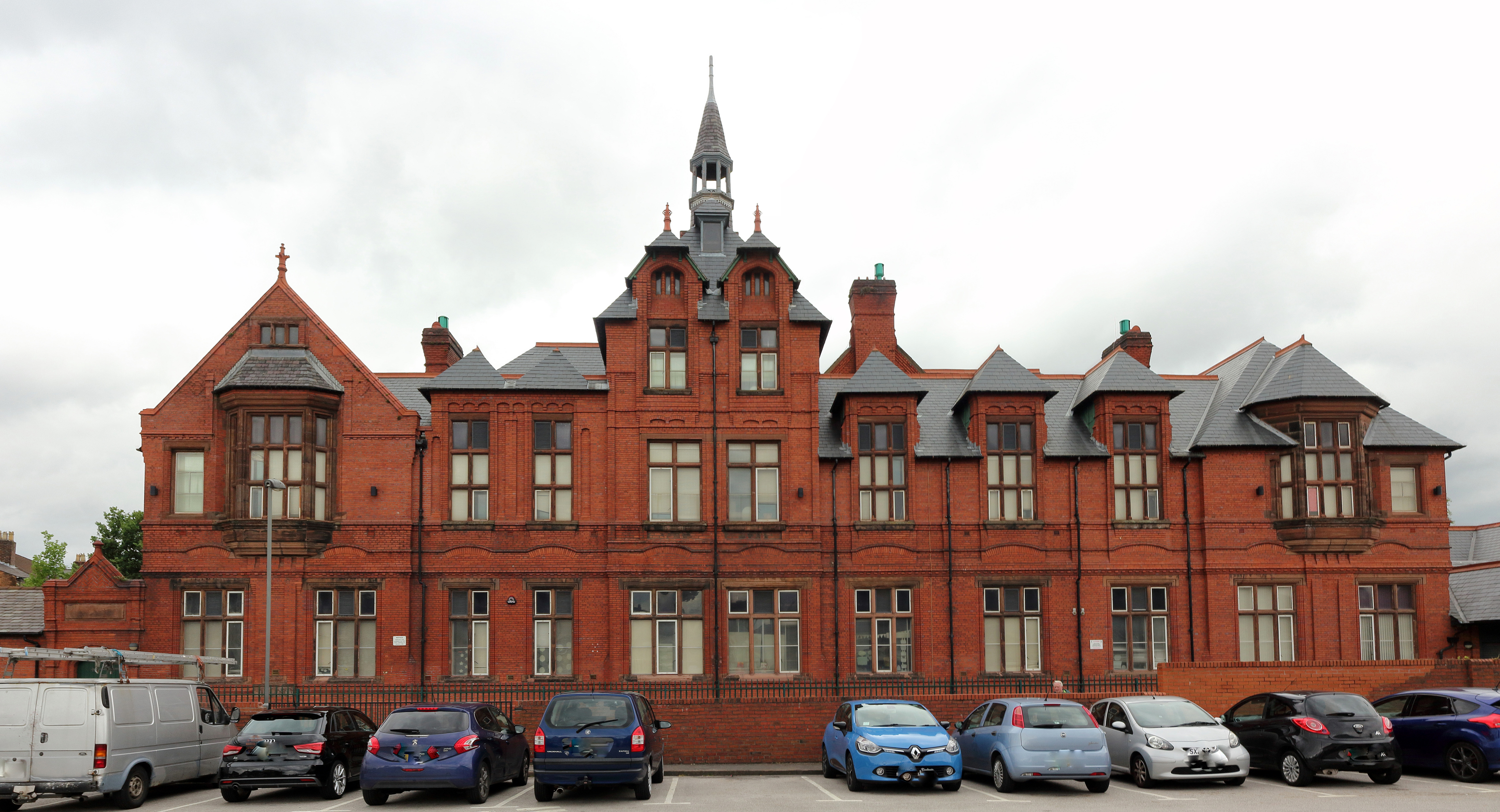

Location
- Arnot Street; Walton; Liverpool, Merseyside, L4 4ED; England
- Coordinates: 53.44252°N 2.96888°W

Information
- Type: Voluntary controlled school
- Religious affiliation: Church of England
- Established: 1883
- Local authority: Liverpool City Council
- Department for Education URN: 135267 Tables
- Ofsted: Reports
- Gender: Co-educational
- Age: 2 to 11
- Website: www.arnotstmary.co.uk

Arnot St Mary Primary School is a Church of England primary school situated in the Walton area of Liverpool, England. The building is listed at Grade II by Historic England. The site was formerly Arnot Community Primary School; however, as a result of the school merging with Walton St Mary Church of England Primary, the site re-opened in 2008 as Arnot St Mary Primary School.

== History ==
Formerly a Board School (1884–91), where elementary education could be provided independent of the Church of England, it was the principal site of the Walton Board. It subsequently became Walton St Mary Church of England Primary School. The school merged with the local Arnot Street Community Primary School in September 2008. While the building work on the Arnot Site took place, most classes were taught on the Walton St Mary site. The work finished and the school became Arnot St Mary Church of England Primary School in September 2009.

== Building ==
The architect was Edmund Kirby, with construction by Joshua Henshaw and Sons of Liverpool.
