= Kirkdale railway station =

Stop on the Northern Line of the Merseyrail network

Kirkdale
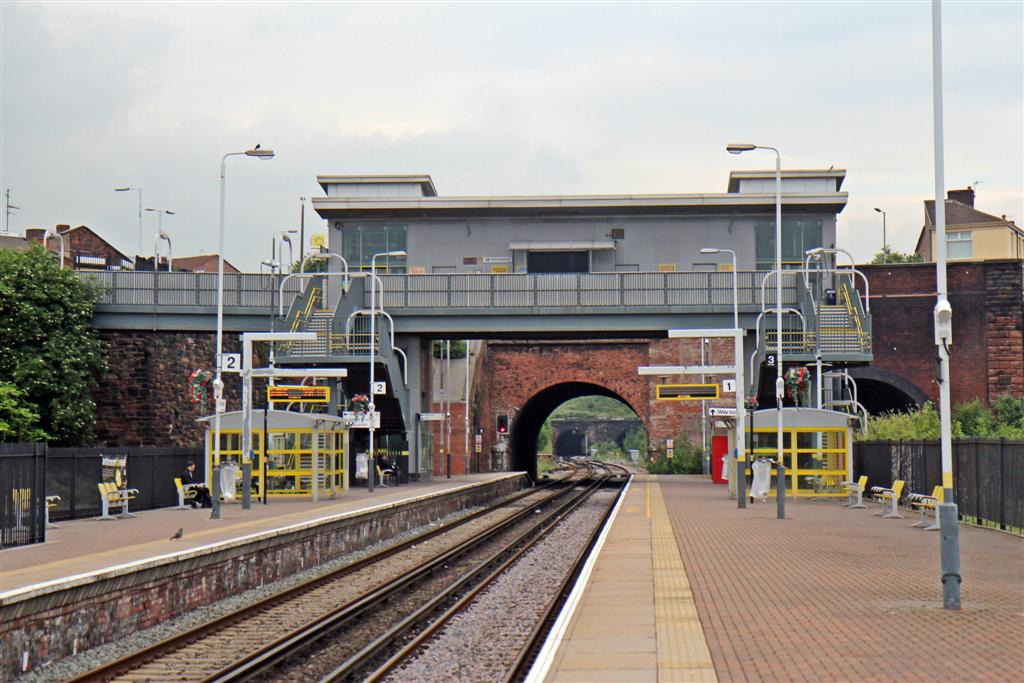
- The platforms, footbridge and ticket office

General information
- Location: Kirkdale, Liverpool; England
- Coordinates: 53.4408°N 2.9811°W
- Grid reference: SJ349942
- Managed by: Merseyrail
- Transit authority: Merseytravel
- Platforms: 2

Other information
- Station code: KKD
- Fare zone: C1
- Classification: DfT category E

Key dates
- 20 November 1848: Opened as Bootle Lane
- 1 February 1876: Renamed Kirkdale
- 2000: Refurbished

Passengers
- 2020/21: ▼0.366 million
- Interchange: 47,683
- 2021/22: ▲0.851 million
- Interchange: ▲0.103 million
- 2022/23: ▲1.034 million
- Interchange: ▲0.126 million
- 2023/24: ▲1.054 million
- Interchange: ▼0.112 million
- 2024/25: ▼0.930 million
- Interchange: ▲0.120 million
Location
Notes
- Passenger statistics from the Office of Rail and Road

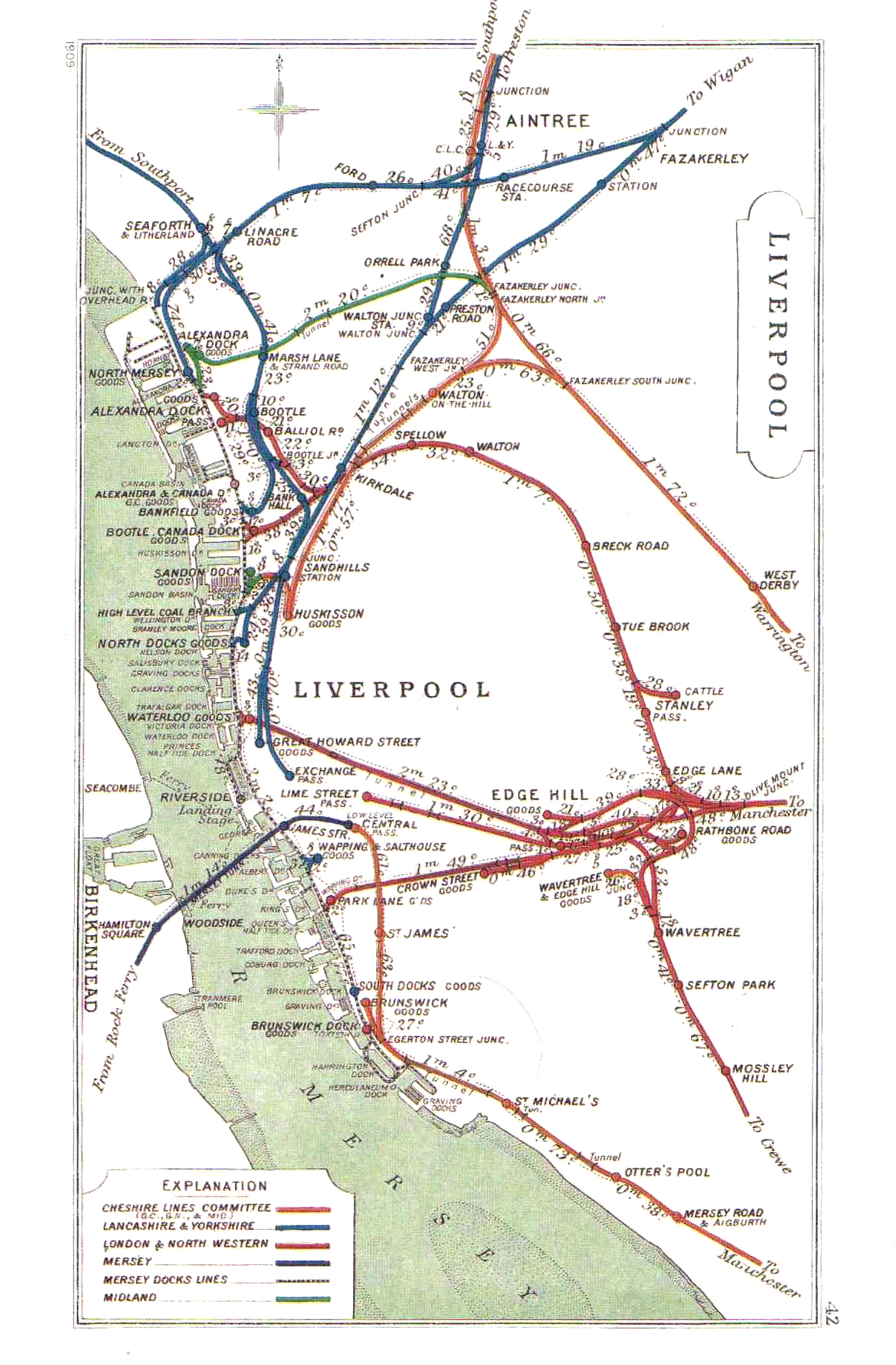
A 1909 map showing Kirkdale station

Kirkdale railway station is a railway station in Kirkdale, Liverpool, England, located to the north of the city centre on the Northern Line of the Merseyrail network. It acts as the interchange between the branches to Kirkby and Ormskirk; these lines diverge just north of the station.

Kirkdale TMD train maintenance depot, the largest depot on the Merseyrail Network, is located adjacent to the station.

== History ==
The station originally opened as Bootle Lane was built by the Liverpool, Ormskirk and Preston Railway and Liverpool and Bury Railway at the start of their joint line into Liverpool, opening in 1848. In 1977 it became part of the Merseyrail network's Northern Line.

=== Five tunnels ===
The station is aligned north–south. When facing north, five tunnel portals can be seen north of the platforms.

To the west lies a cluster of three very short tunnels, running under a road. These tunnels were to give greater throughput, and are all on the same line. The westernmost tunnel is used for shunting. The next tunnel is the main Merseyrail Northern Line tunnel. The third tunnel is disused, but was in use until 1968 as the fast line for expresses to Yorkshire and Manchester.

To the east is a cluster of two tunnels. The easternmost tunnel was an abandoned project. The adjacent tunnel runs in tunnels and cuttings to the disused Walton on the Hill station, and was a part of the North Liverpool Extension Line. This section of line was used from 1879 to 1979; however, trains running on it never called at Kirkdale station.

=== Freight lines ===
Two freight lines passed through or under the station.

The busy Canada Dock Branch freight-only line serving Liverpool Docks passes under the station, roughly north-east to south-west, via a tunnel.

The North Liverpool Extension Line, also referred to as the eastern section of the Outer Loop, emerged from the north out of a tunnel next to the station, running parallel to the west platform. This section of line was used from 1879 to 1979.

== Facilities ==
The station (as is usual for most on Merseyrail) is fully staffed throughout the hours of service all week. The platforms are fully accessible and step-free (as noted above) and there are shelters, customer information screens and timetable poster boards on each platform. Train running information is also offered by automated announcements. The station has two car-parking spaces for disabled users and cycle racks for 10 cycles.

== Services ==
Trains operate every 15 minutes, Monday - Saturday during the daytime to either Kirkby or Ormskirk to the north, and every 5 or 10 minutes to Liverpool Central to the south. During the evenings after 20:00 and all day Sundays, services are every 30 minutes to Kirkby and Ormskirk, and every 15 minutes to Liverpool.

== Gallery ==
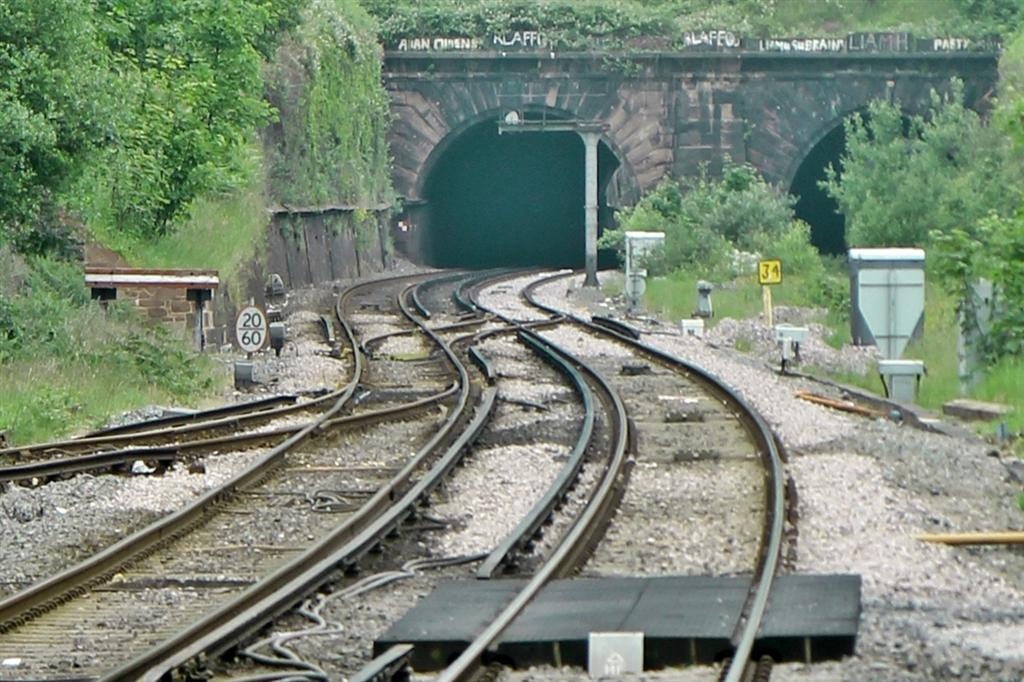
The railway tunnel to both Rice Lane and Walton, viewed from the end of the platform

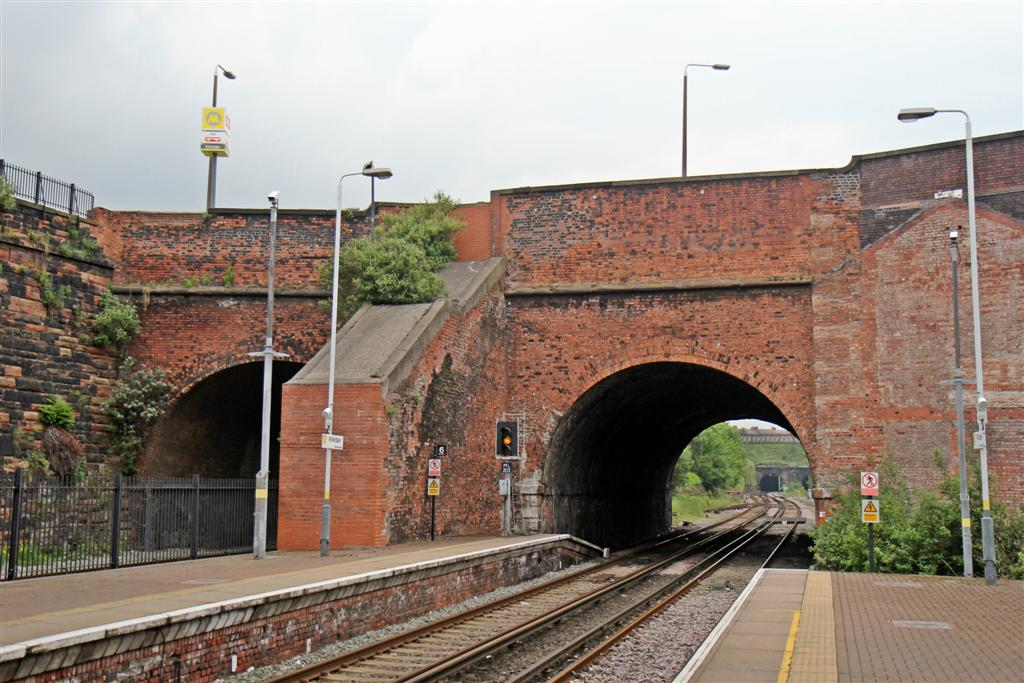
The A5090 road bridge, at the end of the platform

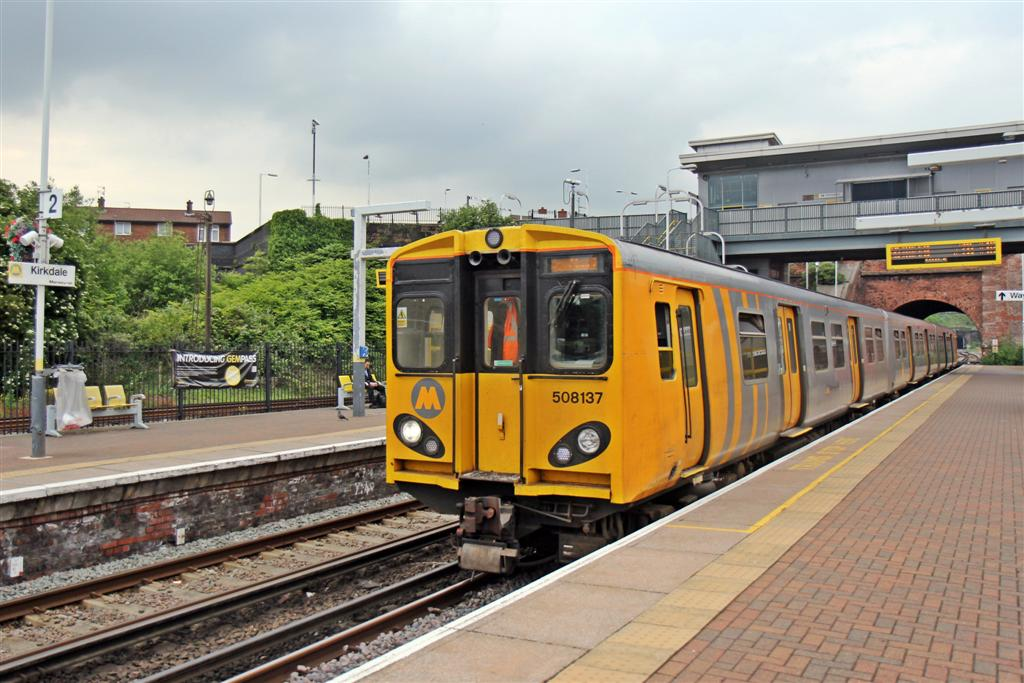
A Merseyrail Class 508 arrives with a service to Liverpool.

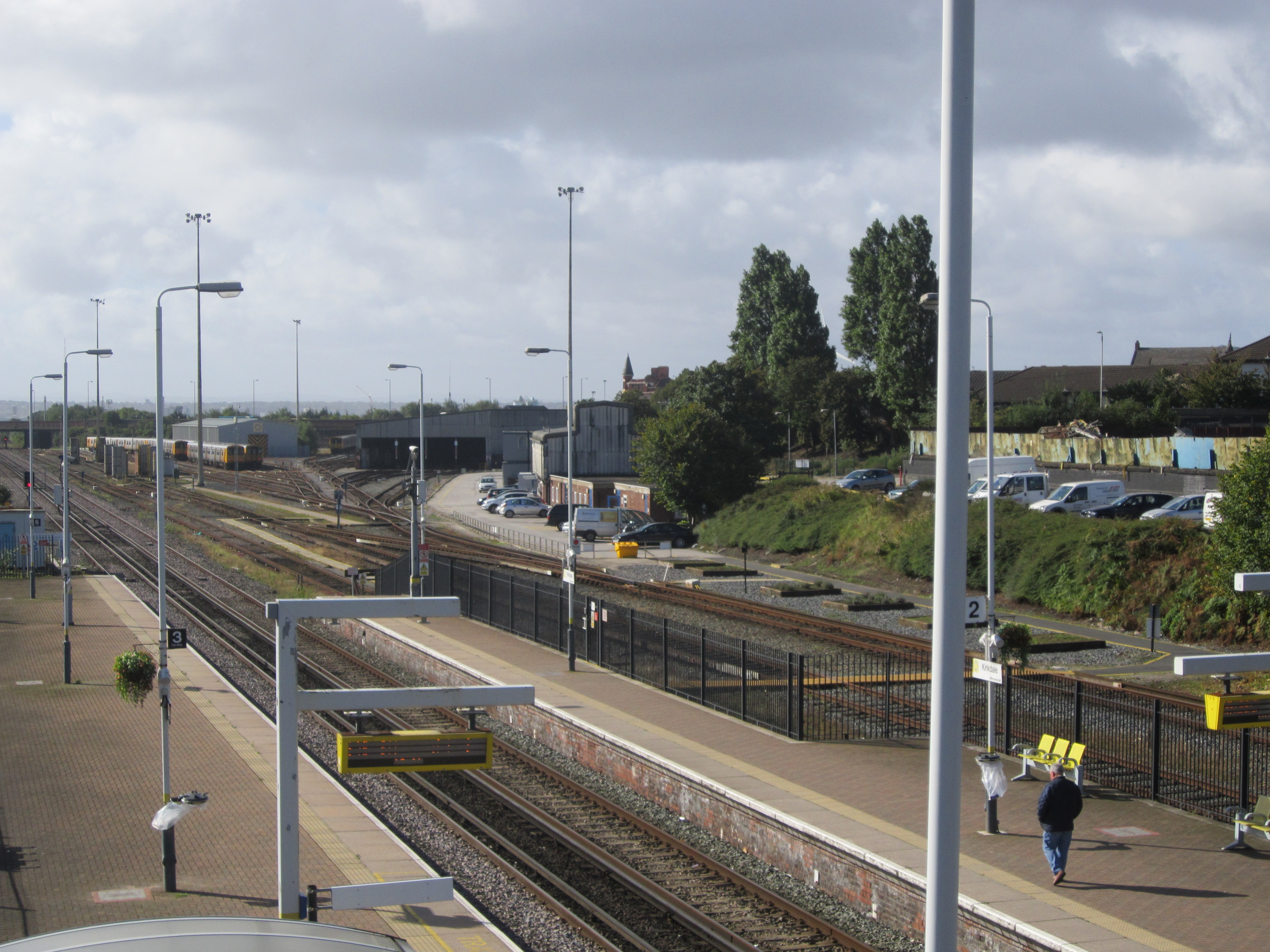
The station with Kirkdale TMD in the distance

Preceding station	National Rail	Following station
Walton towards Ormskirk	Merseyrail; Northern Line; Ormskirk Branch	Sandhills towards Liverpool Central
Rice Lane towards Headbolt Lane	Merseyrail; Northern Line; Kirkby Branch	Sandhills towards Liverpool Central
